= 2012 Euskaltel–Euskadi season =

2012 Euskaltel–Euskadi season
Manager	Miguel Madariaga
One-day victories	1
Stage race overall victories	1
Stage race stage victories	6
Previous season • Next season

The 2012 season for Euskaltel–Euskadi began in January at the Tour Down Under. As a UCI ProTeam, they were automatically invited and obligated to send a squad to every event in the UCI World Tour.

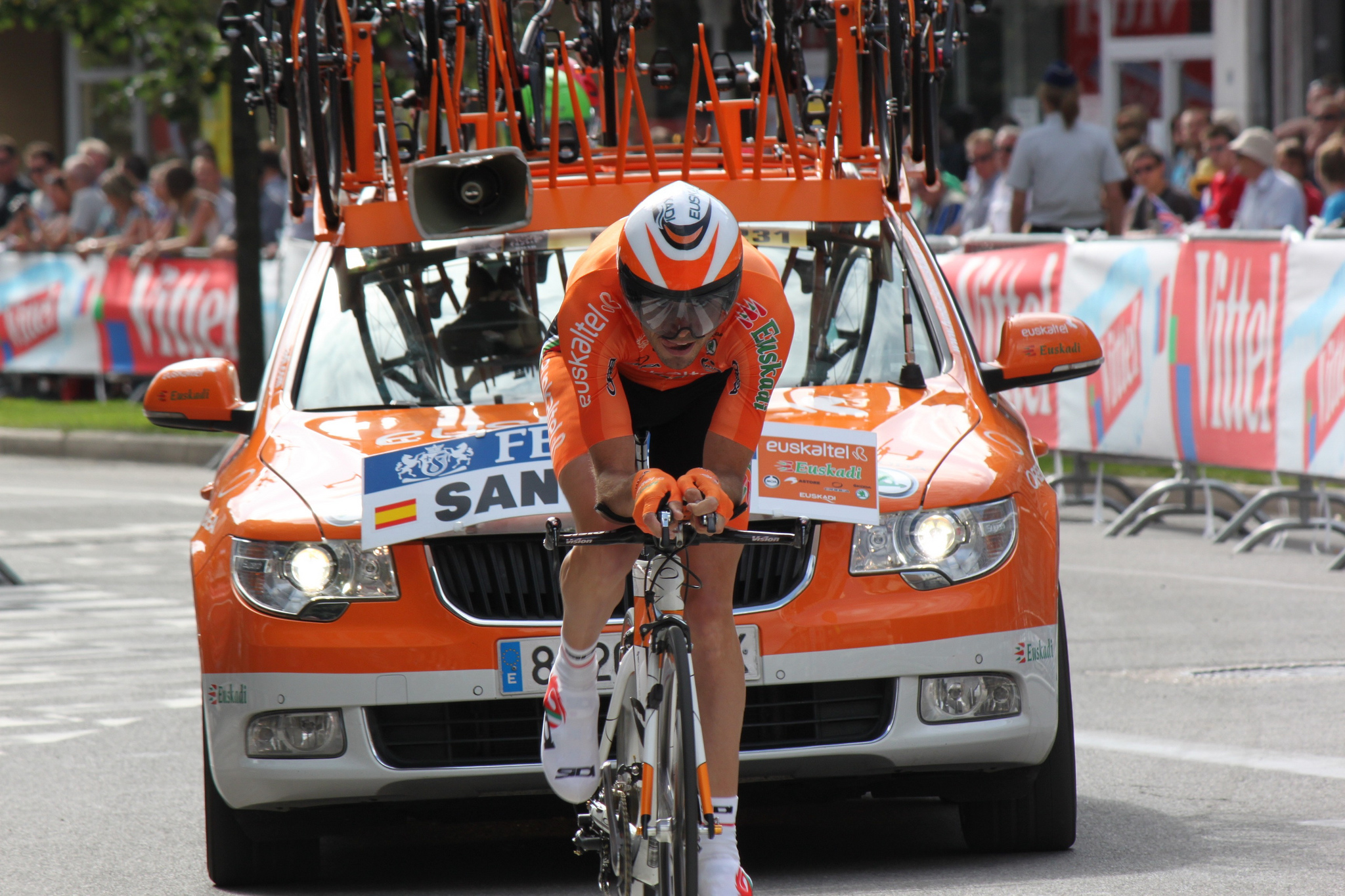
Samuel Sanchez during the prologue of the Tour de France 2012

The team experiences a managerial change, as Igor González de Galdeano left the post at the end of 2011 season, and was replaced by the man named, Miguel Madariaga. Madariaga has stated that he was taking the position only for 2012 and will leave before 2013, perhaps not coincidentally when the Basque government will remove or at least greatly reduce their financial commitment to the team.

== 2012 roster ==
Ages as of 1 January 2012.

Rider	Date of birth
Igor Antón (ESP)	2 March 1983 (aged 28)
Mikel Astarloza (ESP)	17 November 1979 (aged 32)
Jorge Azanza (ESP)	16 June 1982 (aged 29)
Pello Bilbao (ESP)	27 February 1990 (aged 21)
Victor Cabedo (ESP)	15 June 1989 (aged 22)
Pierre Cazaux (FRA)	7 June 1984 (aged 27)
Ricardo Garcia (ESP)	26 February 1988 (aged 23)
Gorka Izagirre (ESP)	7 October 1987 (aged 24)
Jon Izagirre (ESP)	4 February 1989 (aged 22)
Mikel Landa (ESP)	13 December 1989 (aged 22)
Egoi Martínez (ESP)	15 May 1978 (aged 33)

Rider	Date of birth
Miguel Minguez (ESP)	30 August 1988 (aged 23)
Mikel Nieve (ESP)	26 May 1984 (aged 27)
Juan José Oroz (ESP)	7 November 1980 (aged 31)
Alan Pérez (ESP)	15 July 1982 (aged 29)
Rubén Pérez (ESP)	30 October 1981 (aged 30)
Adrián Sáez (ESP)	17 March 1986 (aged 25)
Samuel Sánchez (ESP)	5 February 1978 (aged 33)
Romain Sicard (FRA)	1 January 1988 (aged 24)
Amets Txurruka (ESP)	10 November 1982 (aged 29)
Pablo Urtasun (ESP)	29 March 1980 (aged 31)
Iván Velasco (ESP)	8 February 1980 (aged 31)
Gorka Verdugo (ESP)	4 November 1978 (aged 33)

Riders who joined the team for the 2012 season

Rider	2011 team
Mikel Astarloza	ex-pro (Euskaltel–Euskadi, 2009)
Ricardo Garcia	neo-pro (Orbea)
Victor Cabedo	neo-pro (Orbea)
Adrián Sáez	neo-pro (Orbea)

Riders who left the team during or after the 2011 season

Rider	2012 team
Koldo Fernández	Garmin–Barracuda
Jonathan Castroviejo	Movistar Team
Iñaki Isasi	Retired
Javier Aramendia	Caja Rural
Daniel Sesma	Retired

Rider who left the team during the 2012 season

Rider	reason
Victor Cabedo	Deceased

== Season victories ==
Date	Race	Competition	Rider	Country	Location
24 March	Volta a Catalunya, Stage 6	UCI World Tour	Samuel Sánchez (ESP)	Spain	Badalona
4 April	Tour of the Basque Country, Stage 3	UCI World Tour	Samuel Sánchez (ESP)	Spain	Eibar
7 April	Tour of the Basque Country, Stage 6	UCI World Tour	Samuel Sánchez (ESP)	Spain	Oñati
7 April	Tour of the Basque Country, Overall	UCI World Tour	Samuel Sánchez (ESP)	Spain	
7 April	Tour of the Basque Country, Points classification	UCI World Tour	Samuel Sánchez (ESP)	Spain	
28 April	Vuelta a Asturias, Stage 2b	UCI Europe Tour	Jon Izagirre (ESP)	Spain	Piedras Blancas
22 May	Giro d'Italia, Stage 16	UCI World Tour	Jon Izagirre (ESP)	Italy	Falzes-Pfalzen
25 July	Prueba Villafranca de Ordizia	UCI Europe Tour	Gorka Izagirre (ESP)	Spain	Ordizia
15 September	Tour of Britain, Stage 7	UCI Europe Tour	Pablo Urtasun (ESP)	Great Britain	Dartmouth

== Death of Victor Cabedo ==
On September 19, 2012, squad member Victor Cabedo died in a training accident near his home of Onda, following a collision with a vehicle, subsequently falling into a ravine. He was 23.
