= 2011 Euskaltel–Euskadi season =

Cycling team season

2011 Euskaltel–Euskadi season
Manager	Igor González de Galdeano
One-day victories	1
Stage race overall victories	–
Stage race stage victories	9
Previous season • Next season

The 2011 season for Euskaltel–Euskadi began in January at the Tour Down Under and ended in October at the Giro di Lombardia. It was the team's eighteenth season as a professional cycling team, and its eleventh with UCI ProTeam – Trade Team 1 between 2001 and 2004 – status. As a UCI ProTeam, they were automatically invited and obligated to send a squad to every event on the UCI World Tour calendar. For the second year in a row, the traditionally all-Basque team added a French rider. This year, it was second-year professional Pierre Cazaux, who rode for FDJ in 2010.

The team achieved ten victories in 2011, down from a tally of seventeen the previous season, but among the ten were some of the most difficult days of racing in the entire season. These included back-to-back stages with summit finishes at the Giro d'Italia, with Igor Antón winning at the summit of the Monte Zoncolan, and Mikel Nieve, who won by over 90 seconds the following day at the Val di Fassa. The squad's captain at the Tour de France, Samuel Sánchez won the first high-mountain finish of the race, up to Luz Ardiden; he eventually finished the race in fifth place overall, and won the King of the Mountains sub-classification. Though he failed to figure as an overall contender at the Vuelta a España, Antón won the first Vuelta stage ending in the Basque Country in 33 years, a stage with clear importance for the team.

== 2011 roster ==
Ages as of January 1, 2011.

Rider	Date of birth
Igor Antón (ESP)	March 2, 1983 (aged 27)
Javier Aramendia (ESP)	December 5, 1986 (aged 24)
Mikel Astarloza (Note: Astarloza joined the team on August 3, following the completion of a drugs ban.) (ESP)	November 17, 1979 (aged 31)
Jorge Azanza (ESP)	June 16, 1982 (aged 28)
Pello Bilbao (Note: Bilbao joined the team on March 1.) (ESP)	February 25, 1990 (aged 20)
Jonathan Castroviejo (ESP)	April 27, 1987 (aged 23)
Pierre Cazaux (FRA)	June 7, 1984 (aged 26)
Koldo Fernández (ESP)	September 13, 1981 (aged 29)
Iñaki Isasi (ESP)	April 20, 1977 (aged 33)
Gorka Izagirre (ESP)	October 7, 1987 (aged 23)
Jon Izagirre (ESP)	February 4, 1989 (aged 21)
Mikel Landa (ESP)	December 13, 1989 (aged 21)
Egoi Martínez (ESP)	May 15, 1978 (aged 32)

Rider	Date of birth
Miguel Minguez (ESP)	August 30, 1988 (aged 22)
Mikel Nieve (ESP)	May 26, 1984 (aged 26)
Juan José Oroz (ESP)	November 7, 1980 (aged 30)
Alan Pérez (ESP)	July 15, 1982 (aged 28)
Rubén Pérez (ESP)	October 30, 1981 (aged 29)
Samuel Sánchez (ESP)	February 5, 1978 (aged 32)
Daniel Sesma (ESP)	June 18, 1984 (aged 26)
Romain Sicard (FRA)	January 1, 1988 (aged 23)
Amets Txurruka (ESP)	November 10, 1982 (aged 28)
Pablo Urtasun (ESP)	March 29, 1980 (aged 30)
Iván Velasco (ESP)	February 8, 1980 (aged 30)
Gorka Verdugo (ESP)	November 4, 1978 (aged 32)

Riders who joined the team for the 2011 season

Rider	2010 team
Pierre Cazaux	FDJ
Jon Izagirre	Orbea
Mikel Landa	Orbea
Pello Bilbao	Orbea

Riders who left the team during or after the 2010 season

Rider	2011 team
Sergio De Lis	Retired
Aitor Galdós	Caja Rural
Aitor Hernández	None
Beñat Intxausti	Movistar Team

== One-day races ==
Prior to the spring season and the races known as classics, the team was active at the Vuelta a Mallorca series of single-day races. They took high placings at the unofficial Trofeo Palma de Mallorca (Fernández in eighth) and at the Trofeo Inca (Izagirre in 9th).

=== Spring classics ===
Team captain Sánchez took the team's first race win of the season at the GP Miguel Indurain. The team effectively controlled the front of the race all day, keeping the peloton at a high pace and reeling in breakaways, including one from Movistar Team's Vasil Kiryienka in the final kilometers that Sánchez later described as "strong." Atop the Basilica del Puy, Sánchez outsprinted second placed Alexandr Kolobnev so convincingly that he opened a time gap of 2 seconds. Sánchez also turned in a good ride at La Flèche Wallonne. The Asturian rode with the race's top favorites all day, and came third behind Philippe Gilbert and Joaquim Rodríguez atop the Mur de Huy at the finish. Sánchez also finished near to the front of the race at the last of the Ardennes classics, Liège–Bastogne–Liège, with tenth on the day.

The team's presence at other single-day races in the spring season was paltry. Only two other races featured top-ten finishes from the team. Txurruka took seventh at the Klasika Primavera, finishing staunchly in the middle of a 15-man sprint at the finish. Antón similarly made all the day's selections and finished 11th in this group, as he built his form for the Giro d'Italia. Later in April at the Gran Premio de Llodio, Nieve rode to eighth-place finishing with the first chase group behind a solo winner.

The team also sent squads to the Clásica de Almería, Milan–San Remo, Gent–Wevelgem, the Tour of Flanders, the Scheldeprijs, the Grand Prix Pino Cerami, Paris–Roubaix, the Amstel Gold Race, and the Vuelta a La Rioja, but finished no higher than 12th in any of these races. Paris–Roubaix figured as an especially difficult day for the team, as Alan Pérez was the team's only classified finisher and was well down in 107th place on the day.

=== Fall races ===
The team had few noteworthy performances in later-season single-day races. Sánchez held the Clásica de San Sebastián as a target for his season, hoping to be the first Euskaltel-Euskadi rider to win the race. Sánchez rode at the front of the race most of the day, until the winner Philippe Gilbert made his signature solo attack to earn victory. Sánchez finished near the back of the chase pack 14 seconds down the road, for eighth place on the day. Izagirre just missed the podium at the Prueba Villafranca de Ordizia, finishing fourth in a five-man escape that decided the race. Near the end of the season, the team did obtain a podium finish. Trainee rider Peio Bilbao finished second in October's Tour de Vendée. He was just edged out by Vacansoleil–DCM's Marco Marcato in a five-man sprint finish. Only 14 riders officially completed this race due to race organizers strictly enforcing the time cut.

The team also sent squads to the Circuito de Getxo, the Châteauroux Classic, Vattenfall Cyclassics, the GP Ouest-France, the Grand Prix Cycliste de Québec, the Grand Prix Cycliste de Montréal, Paris–Tours, the Giro del Piemonte, and the Giro di Lombardia, but finished no higher than 15th in any of these races.

== Stage races ==
Sánchez won stage 4 at the Tour of the Basque Country in April, the team's first win in a stage race on the season. He made the day's selections and stayed with an elite group which formed at the top of the Arrate climb. Sánchez attacked on the descent and won the stage that way, though he did not have a time gap at the finish. Sánchez had also won the stage run on this same course in 2010. Antón finished on the podium, in third, at the Vuelta a Castilla y León, thanks to a fourth place on the race's one summit finish and a solid individual time trial the next day. At the Tour de Romandie, Castroviejo took a relatively rare time trial win for the team, coming home mere tenths of a second better than Taylor Phinney and Leigh Howard in the 3.5 km (2.2 mi) prologue. He turned in another strong time trial later in the Tour de Romandie, finishing ninth in the stage 4 race against the clock, which was 20.1 km (12.5 mi) long, as well as eighth earlier in the season in the 9.3 km (5.8 mi) time trial which closed out the Tirreno–Adriatico. Castroviejo further confirmed his prowess in the short time trial by winning stage 1 of the Vuelta a la Comunidad de Madrid, a 7.8 km (4.8 mi) timed race. No rider finished within 10 seconds of his winning time.

The team had a successful Vuelta a Burgos in August. Defending champion Sánchez won the first stage, atop San Juan del Monte, by outkicking Joaquim Rodríguez in sight of the line as the two finished four seconds better than any other riders. However, he lost the race lead to Rodríguez when the latter won stage 2 in the city of Burgos. The stage 3 team time trial then dropped Sánchez to fifth overall, before he improved to fourth after stage 4. Landa won stage 5 from a breakaway, his first professional victory. Winning the final climb also gave him enough points to take the race's mountains classification. The squad placed three riders in the top ten, with Sánchez fourth, Antón eighth, and Nieve tenth. Antón rounded out the team's season by winning the climber's prize at the inaugural Tour of Beijing.

The team also sent squads to the Tour Down Under, the Vuelta a Andalucía, the Vuelta a Murcia, Paris–Nice, Tirreno–Adriatico, the Volta a Catalunya, Bayern-Rundfahrt, the Critérium du Dauphiné, the Tour de Suisse, the Brixia Tour, the Eneco Tour, and the Tour du Poitou-Charentes, but did not achieve a stage win, classification win, or podium finish in any of them.

== Grand Tours ==
=== Giro d'Italia ===
Euskaltel-Euskadi has in their history been reticent to ride the Giro d'Italia, favoring the Tour de France and the Vuelta a España instead. After first indicating a reluctant willingness to participate as per the requirements of holding a ProTeam license, the team later stated that they intended to seek overall victory in the race with Antón. Antón was named as the leader of the squad, which included Nieve, Oroz, Isasi, Aramendía, Azanza, Cazaux, Sesma and Minguez to ride in support. Antón tempered the expectations somewhat, saying that a stage win would be nice, as would General Classification success should it come, but that he was only banking on riding for the overall at the Vuelta a España.

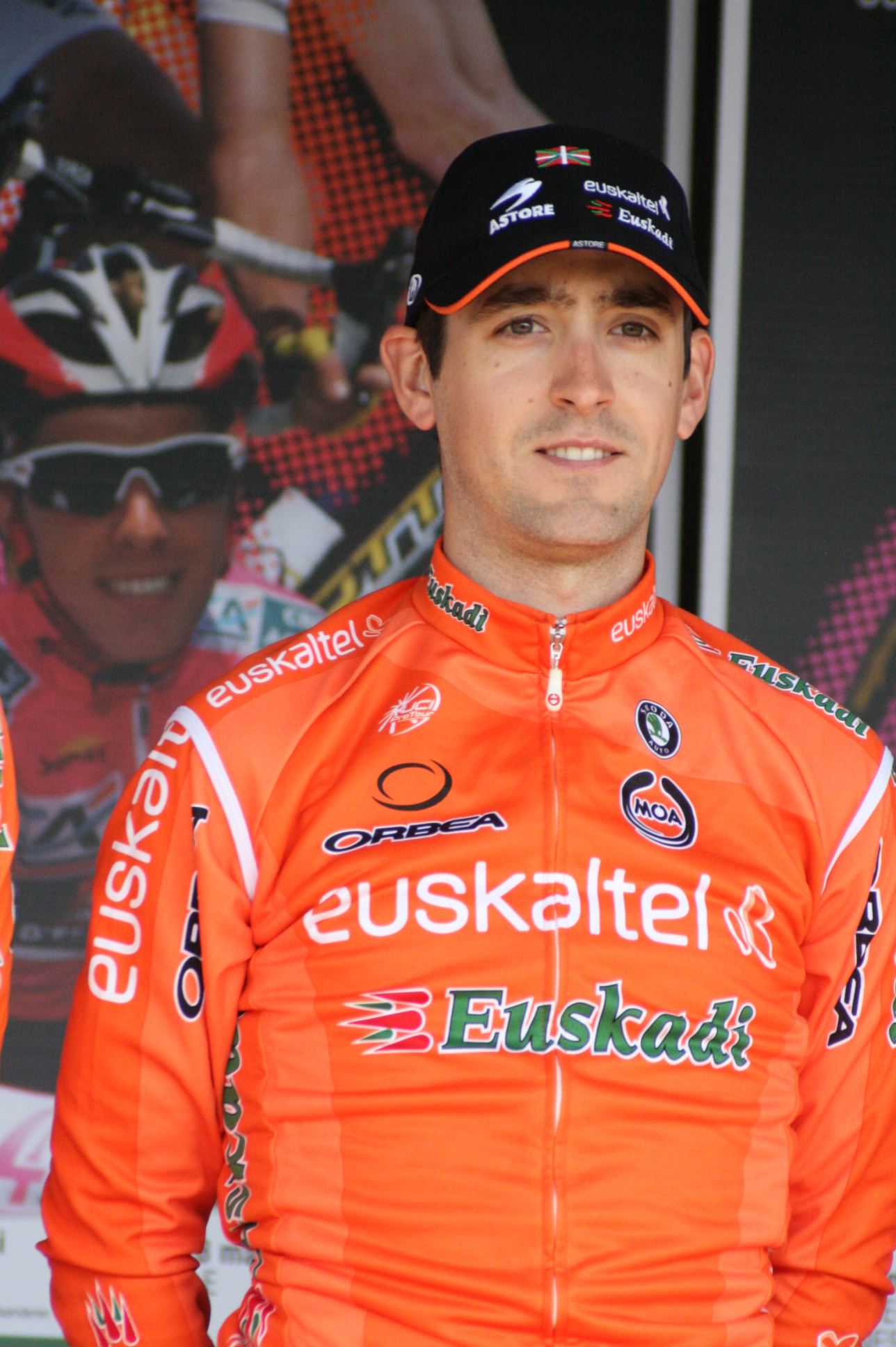
Mikel Nieve won the queen stage at the Giro d'Italia, one of the hardest stages in many years at the Grand Tours.

The squad was dead last of 23 teams in the stage 1 team time trial, losing more than a minute to the winners HTC–Highroad, a result later described by team captain Antón as "a bit ugly". Antón finished with the group of overall favorites in the selective fifth and seventh stages, and was solidly eighth in stage 9 when eventual Giro champion Alberto Contador won the day and first took the race lead, but sat only in 11th place as a result. The squad was, as could be expected, far more successful in the second and more mountainous half of the race. Antón's ride on stage 13 ending at Grossglockner in Austria moved him into the top ten overall for the first time, at seventh place, though he was again distanced from Contador at the front of the race and lay over four minutes down. The next day's stage ended at Monte Zoncolan, one of the steepest climbs in all of professional cycling. Antón rode with the top overall riders until about 7.5 km (4.7 mi) to go, when he attacked and broke free. Riding for a time with Contador and Joaquim Rodríguez, who had bridged up, Antón put in another attack with 6 km (3.7 mi) left to go, and surpassed the remaining riders from the morning breakaway to occupy first position on the road. He rode alone to the finish for the stage win, by 33 seconds over Contador in second place. Antón revealed after the stage that he had never ridden the climb before, having only seen it on television. He admitted it was a risk to attack for victory from as far out as he did and that he suffered badly in the final few kilometers, but was still able to hold on. Antón called the Zoncolan climb "mythical" and "absolutely the hardest climb for a bike race." The result installed him into third place overall, still more than three minutes down on Contador but only a single second behind Vincenzo Nibali for second place. Antón mused that he may try to hold on to his podium placing to the conclusion of the race.

The next day featured the third consecutive summit finish prior to the second rest day, at Gardeccia, near the Fascia Valley. Nieve figured into a high-powered breakaway that formed right as the morning's initial breakaway was caught, after about 50 km (31 mi) had been raced. Also in the group were former Grand Tour winners Stefano Garzelli, Danilo Di Luca, and Carlos Sastre, and it was Nieve and Garzelli who formed a chase behind Vacansoleil–DCM's Johnny Hoogerland on the way to the Cima Coppi (the Giro's tallest climb) at the Passo Giau. Garzelli took the climb, and the Passo Fedaia that followed, and maintained first position on the road well into the stage-concluding climb, but Nieve eventually caught and passed him with 5.7 km (3.5 mi) left to race. Nieve won the stage, and as he approached the finish line he attempted to raise his arms in a gesture of triumph, but he found himself too fatigued to do even that. Nieve's ride had taken nearly seven and a half hours, visiting five grueling high-category climbs along the way. The day was not a good one for Antón. He finished eight minutes back of teammate Nieve, losing between four and six minutes to the race's top overall riders. He fell back to 11th with the day's results, while Nieve entered the top ten at fifth overall.

Despite the stage 16 individual time trial being almost fully composed of the Nevegal climb, Antón finished the stage in 13th, a minute and 21 seconds back of the day's winner Contador while Nieve was 36th, two minutes 19 seconds down. Nieve fell to sixth overall, while Antón moved past David Arroyo for tenth as Arroyo lost even more time than Antón did. While Antón again fell from the top ten as a result of Kanstantsin Sivtsov's stage 17 breakaway ride gaining him just under three minutes, Nieve's position held steady until stage 20, the Giro's final road race. Movistar Team's Vasil Kiryienka rode to a dominant stage victory, coming in almost five minutes before the day's second-placed rider and about six minutes ahead of the largest group of the race's top riders. Nieve was a further three minutes down in 17th, and fell to tenth overall. Nieve stood to lose time in the more straightforward stage 21 individual time trial, where he, like most of the team, struggles mightily. He indeed finished well down, in 114th place on the day nearly four minutes slower than the day's winner David Millar. With Sivtsov tenth two and a half minutes better than Nieve, he took the Basque's top-ten overall position, leaving Nieve to finish the Giro 11th overall. Antón, for his part, finished in 18th place, having lost nearly twenty minutes in stage 19.

=== Tour de France ===
With Antón focusing on the Vuelta a España, Sánchez led the squad sent to the Tour de France. Team manager Igor González de Galdeano said that a stage win was an important objective, having come very close to one with Sánchez in the 2010 Tour de France, only to have him lose a two-up sprint to Andy Schleck. He also hoped Sánchez would finish in the top three. With the stage 2 team time trial presenting such a clear detriment to Sánchez' overall hopes, the team gathered for a special training session about two weeks prior to the Tour to focus solely on that discipline. Martínez, Verdugo, Txurruka, Velasco, Urtasun, Izagirre, and Rubén and Alan Pérez were also named to the squad.

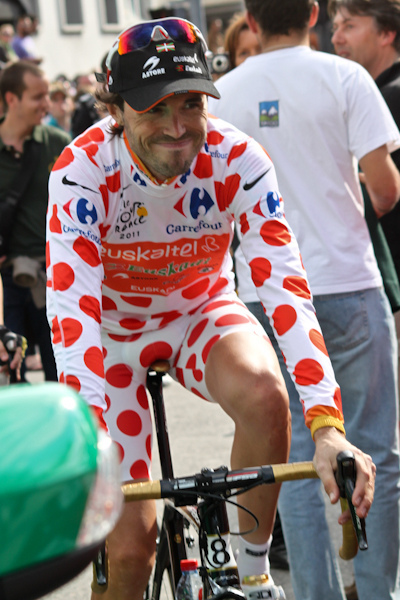
Samuel Sánchez held the King of the Mountains lead on two occasions, and won the jersey in Paris.

Sánchez' overall hopes took an immediate hit. Near the end of stage 1, two crashes greatly reduced the number of riders who contested the finish at the Mont des Alouettes. Despite this finish being slightly uphill, the stage was classified flat, meaning any riders who crashed within the final 3 km (1.9 mi) would receive the same finishing time as those they were with upon crashing, regardless of when they actually finished. The second of the two crashes occurred inside 3 km (1.9 mi), but the first did not, and it was behind that first crash that Sánchez, as well as two-time defending champion Alberto Contador, was caught. As a result of little more than bad luck, Sánchez was immediately a minute and 20 seconds down, in 79th place. The next day, despite extra team time trial training prior to the Tour, the squad finished still finished last of the 22 teams, losing a minute and 22 seconds to the day's winners Garmin–Cervélo. This dropped Sánchez to 104th place. Sánchez began to climb back up the standings in stage 4, similar in profile to stage 1 as it was largely flat but with an uphill finish. Sánchez took eighth atop the Mûr-de-Bretagne, gaining 47 places in the standings as he took time out of the vast majority of the field. Sánchez finished close to the front of the race on stage 8 on Super Besse. Movistar Team's Rui Costa took the victory alone a few seconds ahead of the field, but Sánchez finished fourth, in the first large group, improving his position to 29th. Sánchez' time gap to the race leader grew as a result of stage 9, when Thomas Voeckler took the yellow jersey from a breakaway, but his position improved, to 20th, since riders who had begun the day ahead of him lost more time than he did.

Stage 12, the Bastille Day stage, was the first particularly difficult mountain stage in this Tour. It ended at the hors catégorie climb Luz Ardiden, and also visited the hors catégorie Col du Tourmalet and a never-before-seen first category climb La Hourquette d'Ancizan. Sánchez effectively stayed with the group of overall favorites throughout the day, and attacked with Omega Pharma–Lotto's Jelle Vanendert on the way up to Luz Ardiden, surpassing the morning breakaway. Starting his sprint for the finish line from 250 m (820 ft) out, Sánchez won so convincingly that he opened up a 7-second time gap on Vanendert. It was Sánchez' first Tour stage win of his career and just the third in the team's history – one of them had come from former rider Roberto Laiseka on this very mountain in the 2001 Tour de France. Given the new points system for the mountains classification, Sánchez took the polka-dot jersey as mountains leader due to this win, even though he had not previously scored a single point. The result also installed him into the top ten overall for the first time, as he occupied eighth place. The next day, by winning the Col d'Aubisque climb, Jérémy Roy took the mountains classification lead from Sánchez. In stage 14, the overall favorites chased down a breakaway on the way to the Plateau de Beille summit finish. Once they occupied first position on the road, Andy Schleck tried numerous times to escape but was unable. Vanendert went, and no one but Sánchez put in any serious attempt to chase him down. Vanendert won the stage, and took the mountains classification lead, with Sánchez finishing second, exactly reversing their fates from stage 12. Sánchez also improved to sixth overall with this result. Sánchez improved further in stage 16. While previous race leader Thor Hushovd won the stage from a breakaway, Sánchez, as well as Cadel Evans and Alberto Contador, took time out of some of the race's other top riders by riding away from them on the descent to the finish. Evans was three seconds the better of Sánchez and Contador, who were in turn 18 seconds faster than race leader Thomas Voeckler, Fränk Schleck, Damiano Cunego, and others. They were also 51 seconds the better of Ivan Basso and more than a minute better than Andy Schleck. This result moved Sánchez up to fifth place. Sánchez lost time on stage 18 on the Col du Galibier, finishing 18th almost five minutes behind stage winner Andy Schleck and between one and three minutes behind the race's other top riders. He fell back to eighth because of this.

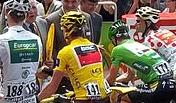
Sánchez, at far right, before the start of the Tour's final stage, with the other jersey winners.

Sánchez rebounded to turn in another strong ride on Alpe d'Huez in stage 19. He, along with Contador and Pierre Rolland formed the leading group on the way up the climb. Contador, who had been riding out front much of the stage after an early attack, faded first and finished the day in third place. Rolland eventually rode away from Sánchez for the stage win, but Sánchez' second place on the day moved him up to seventh overall, and back into the mountains classification lead. Sánchez, as well as Contador, moved up a place in the stage 20 individual time trial. Damiano Cunego, who had been in fifth place and is considered a poor time trialist, had a bad race against the clock even by his standards, losing two minutes to most of the race's top overall riders and more than three to the stage winner. This moved him up to sixth place overall, the position in which he concluded the race the next day, while also finishing as mountains classification winner.

=== Vuelta a España ===
Antón, as expected, was named as the squad leader for the Vuelta a España. His goal was overall success. He was joined in the squad by fellow Giro d'Italia stage winner Nieve, Martínez, Verdugo, Txurruka, Oroz, Isasi, Azanza and Cazaux. Nieve commented a day into the Vuelta that he would ride solely to support Antón, despite the fact that both had won Giro stages and he (Nieve) had actually finished the race higher overall.

The squad was solidly better in the stage 1 team time trial than they had been in the equivalent stages at the Italian and French Grand Tours, coming in 12th of the 22 teams. The result installed Antón 24 seconds back of defending champion Vincenzo Nibali, whose Liquigas–Cannondale squad finished second. Antón had a bad ride on the Vuelta's first day in the mountains, in stage 4. On a blisteringly hot day, Antón lost contact with the main group of overall favorites on the way to the summit finish at Sierra Nevada, losing a minute and a half to the stage winner and more than a minute to the race's top favorites. Antón admitted that he did not have the form of 2010, when he crashed out of the race while holding the overall lead. He said that even on the flat third stage he had come close to losing time to the peloton, and that while there was a long way left to race, he effectively ruled himself out of overall contention. Nieve, on the other hand, had finished with the race's top riders, and lay 14th overall at this point. Antón and Nieve both rode well on stage 8 to San Lorenzo de El Escorial. Joaquim Rodríguez claimed the stage win atop a climb featuring 27% gradients in places, while Antón took sixth 15 seconds back and Nieve 13th a further five seconds back. Both finished well back on stage 9, with Nieve ceding 41 seconds to the day's winner and Antón close to two minutes. Both were all but conclusively ruled out of any overall contention in the stage 10 individual time trial, losing between three and five minutes to the race's top overall riders after their earlier time losses. Txurruka found a winning breakaway in stage 11, but finished well back in seventh place, as David Moncoutié took a dominant solo win.

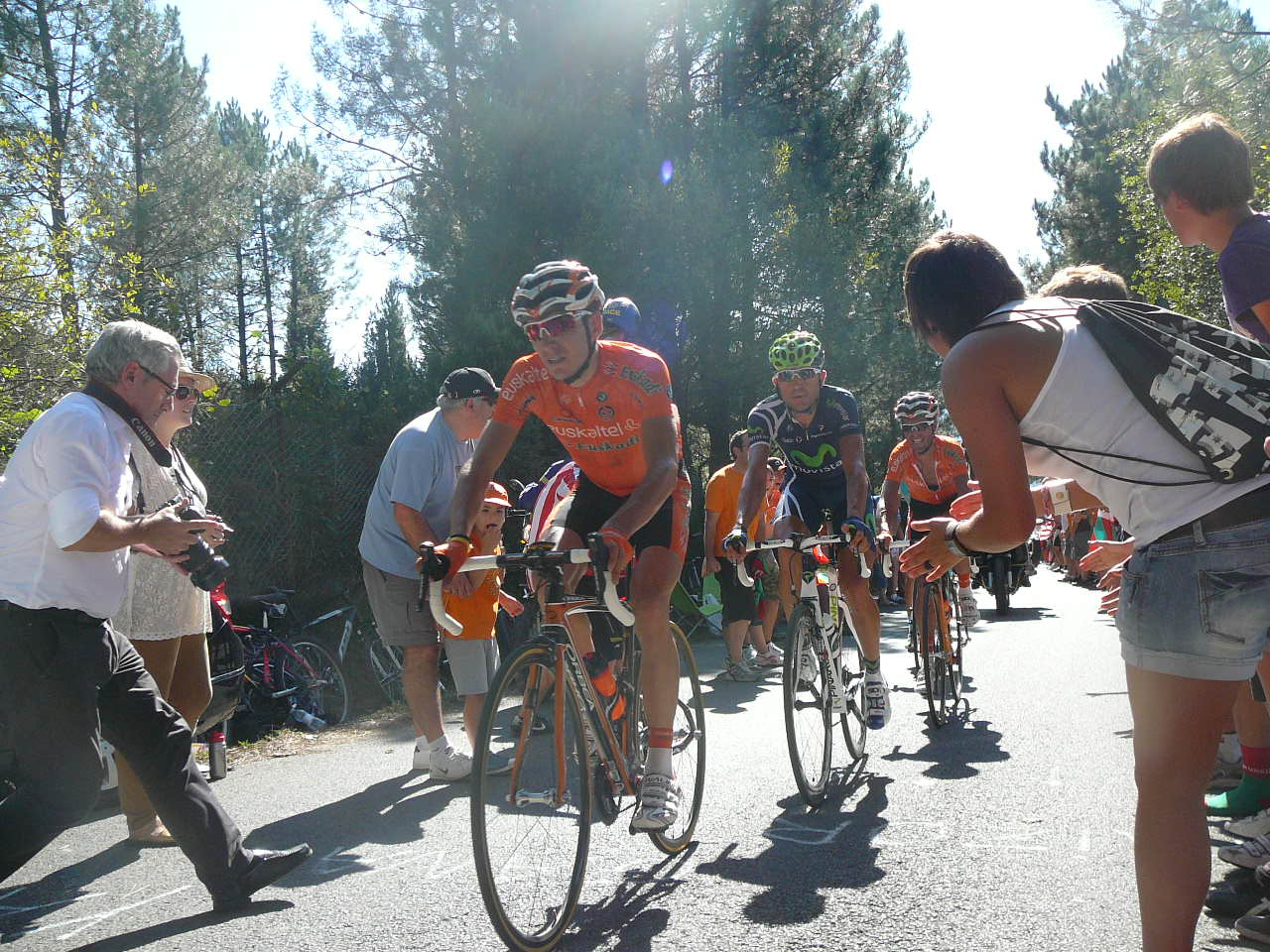
Igor Antón riding at the front of the breakaway early in stage 19, the first Vuelta stage to end in the Basque Country in 33 years. Antón later went on to win the stage.

The team set its sights to stage hunting in the second half of the race, hoping for success on difficult mountain stages, mentioning La Farrapona and Angliru as their targets. Nieve and Verdugo finished at the front of the race in stage 13, in a selective escape group, but finished 9th and 18th respectively in the 18-man sprint. Despite targeting the day, the squad could finish no higher than ninth on La Farrapona in stage 14, as Nieve took that placing. Antón, for his part, finished that stage in the last group on the road, more than half an hour down on the winner. The team was extremely active in stage 15 on Angliru, to the point that one post-race analysis suggested they "left it all" on the climb. Antón crossed the line in sixth place, a minute and 21 seconds down on stage winner and eventual Vuelta champion Juan José Cobo. He said it was the first day at the Vuelta that he had enjoyed. Nieve also had a decent ride, coming 13th, 41 seconds back of Antón. Antón and Nieve finished together in stage 17 on Peña Cabarga, 27 seconds back of eventual Vuelta runner-up Chris Froome for fifth and sixth place. This moved Nieve into tenth place overall.

Stage 19 ended at Bilbao, capital of the province of Biscay in the autonomous community of the Basque Country. It was the first time the race had visited the Basque Country since the 1978 Vuelta a España, when Basque separatist protesters disrupted the race. Thus, it was clearly an important stage for Euskaltel-Euskadi, given their strong Basque identity. Its profile as a medium mountain stage suggesting a breakaway winner was also reasonably favorable to the team. The team indeed placed two riders into the day's four-man escape group – Antón and Verdugo. Antón won the climb at the Puerto de las Muñecas, which was the point when the race officially entered the Basque Country for the first time. Verdugo did far more work in the escape group than Antón, so Antón was left fresh to attack for victory 2 km (1.2 mi) from the top of the Alto El Vivero near the finish. This gained him a time gap over breakaway mate Marzio Bruseghin that he held to the finish in Bilbao, winning the stage. Antón said of his ride “This is an historical win for Euskaltel-Euskadi!” and that he had specifically targeted this stage after his poor form earlier in the race destroyed his overall chances. Nieve held the tenth place he took on Peña Cabarga to finish as the team's best-placed rider, and Antón finished in 33rd place. All nine riders completed the race.

== Season victories ==
Date	Race	Competition	Rider	Country	Location
February 20	Tour du Haut Var, Young rider classification	UCI Europe Tour	Gorka Izagirre (ESP)	France	
March 27	Volta a Catalunya, Sprints classification	UCI World Tour	Rubén Pérez (ESP)	Spain	
April 2	GP Miguel Indurain	UCI Europe Tour	Samuel Sánchez (ESP)	Spain	Estella-Lizarra
April 7	Tour of the Basque Country, Stage 4	UCI World Tour	Samuel Sánchez (ESP)	Spain	Eibar
April 26	Tour de Romandie, Prologue	UCI World Tour	Jonathan Castroviejo (ESP)	Switzerland	Martigny
May 7	Vuelta a la Comunidad de Madrid, Stage 1	UCI Europe Tour	Jonathan Castroviejo (ESP)	Spain	Casa de Campo
May 21	Giro d'Italia, Stage 14	UCI World Tour	Igor Antón (ESP)	Italy	Monte Zoncolan
May 22	Giro d'Italia, Stage 15	UCI World Tour	Mikel Nieve (ESP)	Italy	Gardeccia-Val di Fassa
July 14	Tour de France, Stage 12	UCI World Tour	Samuel Sánchez (ESP)	France	Luz Ardiden
July 24	Tour de France, Mountains classification	UCI World Tour	Samuel Sánchez (ESP)	France	
August 3	Vuelta a Burgos, Stage 1	UCI Europe Tour	Samuel Sánchez (ESP)	Spain	San Juan del Monte
August 7	Vuelta a Burgos, Stage 5	UCI Europe Tour	Mikel Landa (ESP)	Spain	Areniscas de los Pinares
August 7	Vuelta a Burgos, Mountains classification	UCI Europe Tour	Mikel Landa (ESP)	Spain	
August 7	Vuelta a Burgos, Teams classification	UCI Europe Tour	(Note: The riders on the squad were Samuel Sánchez, Mikel Nieve, Juan José Oroz, Iñaki Isasi, Peio Bilbao, Mikel Landa, Igor Antón, and Mikel Astarloza)	Spain	
September 9	Vuelta a España, Stage 19	UCI World Tour	Igor Antón (ESP)	Spain	Bilbao
October 9	Tour of Beijing, Mountains classification	UCI World Tour	Igor Antón (ESP)	China	
