= 2010 Euskaltel–Euskadi season =

2010 Euskaltel–Euskadi season
Manager	Igor González de Galdeano
One-day victories	3
Stage race overall victories	1
Stage race stage victories	13
Previous season • Previous season

The 2010 season for Euskaltel–Euskadi began in January with the Tour Down Under and ended at the Giro di Lombardia. As a UCI ProTour team, they were automatically invited and obliged to attend every event in the ProTour. The season is the sixteenth for the unofficial Basque national team. The team's manager is former Euskadi rider Igor González de Galdeano, who is in his first year in the position after taking over from Miguel Madariaga.

A notable rider joining the team in 2010 is Romain Sicard, the reigning under-23 world champion. Sicard, from the French Basque Country, is only the second non-Spanish rider ever to join the team.

== 2010 roster ==
Ages as of January 1, 2010.

Rider	Date of birth
Igor Antón (ESP)	March 2, 1983 (aged 26)
Javier Aramendia (ESP)	December 5, 1986 (aged 23)
Jorge Azanza (ESP)	June 16, 1982 (aged 27)
Jonathan Castroviejo (ESP)	April 27, 1987 (aged 22)
Sergio De Lis (ESP)	May 9, 1986 (aged 23)
Koldo Fernández (ESP)	September 13, 1981 (aged 28)
Aitor Galdós (ESP)	November 8, 1979 (aged 30)
Aitor Hernández (ESP)	January 24, 1982 (aged 27)
Beñat Intxausti (ESP)	March 20, 1986 (aged 23)
Iñaki Isasi (ESP)	April 20, 1977 (aged 32)
Gorka Izagirre (ESP)	October 7, 1987 (aged 22)
Egoi Martínez (ESP)	May 15, 1978 (aged 31)

Rider	Date of birth
Miguel Minguez (ESP)	August 30, 1988 (aged 21)
Mikel Nieve (ESP)	May 26, 1984 (aged 25)
Juan José Oroz (ESP)	November 7, 1980 (aged 29)
Alan Pérez (ESP)	July 15, 1982 (aged 27)
Rubén Pérez (ESP)	October 30, 1981 (aged 28)
Samuel Sánchez (ESP)	February 5, 1978 (aged 31)
Daniel Sesma (ESP)	June 18, 1984 (aged 25)
Romain Sicard (FRA)	January 1, 1989 (aged 21)
Amets Txurruka (ESP)	November 10, 1982 (aged 27)
Pablo Urtasun (ESP)	March 29, 1980 (aged 29)
Iván Velasco (ESP)	February 8, 1980 (aged 29)
Gorka Verdugo (ESP)	November 4, 1978 (aged 31)

Riders who joined the team for the 2010 season

Rider	2009 team
Miguel Minguez	neo-pro
Jonathan Castroviejo	Orbea
Gorka Izagirre	Contentpolis–Ampo
Beñat Intxausti	Fuji–Servetto
Romain Sicard	Orbea
Daniel Sesma	neo-pro

Riders who left the team during or after the 2009 season

Rider	2010 team
Josu Agirre	Free agent
Mikel Astarloza	Suspended
Markel Irizar	Team RadioShack
Andoni Lafuente	Competing only on the track in 2010
Iñigo Landaluze	Suspended

== Grand Tours ==
As they did in 2009, Euskaltel declined invitation to the Giro d'Italia in 2010.

=== Tour de France ===
Sánchez was the leader of Euskaltel's squad for the Tour, with several Grand Tour veterans beside him, though the team held out some strong riders for the Vuelta a España later in the season. Their goals were a stage win and a high overall placing for Sánchez, who did not ride the Tour in 2009 but had finished seventh overall in 2008.

The squad, being largely composed of climbing specialists, was quiet through the flat stages in the Tour's first week. In stage 8, the race's first mountain stage, Sánchez made all the day's selections and finished at the head of the race, just missing out on a stage win as Andy Schleck pipped him in a two-up sprint. The result did, however, move Sánchez from 21st up to ninth in the overall standings. In stage 9, Sánchez responded to an attack from Schleck and Alberto Contador, briefly riding past them. The two in turn attacked past Sánchez and finished the stage over a minute ahead of him. Sánchez did, however, stay ahead of the other elite riders in the race, gaining a minute on them and moving up to third in the overall classification. In stage 12, Sánchez finished with the main group on the road for sixth on the day, losing ten seconds to Contador but maintaining third overall. In stage 14, after Contador and Schleck, the top two men in the overall standings, came to a bizarre seeming track stand in the stage's final kilometer, Sánchez and fourth place man Denis Menchov rode past them and gained 14 seconds back. The next day, Sánchez followed Contador when he controversially attacked past Schleck as the Luxembourger suffered a mechanical incident. Their group gained 39 seconds over Schleck, but since Menchov was also present, Sánchez's position was largely unchanged. In stage 17, Schleck and Contador again finished well ahead of the rest of the race's elite and decided the stage between themselves. Sánchez was fifth on the day and gained 8 seconds over Menchov in the fight for the bottom step of the podium, but had a lead of only 21 seconds with a long individual time trial (where Menchov is superior) looming. Sánchez indeed fell from the podium in the stage 19 time trial, ceding two minutes to his Russian rival. He still had a comfortable lead over Jurgen Van den Broeck in fifth, and held fourth place after the Tour's largely ceremonial final stage. Though the team did not win anything at the Tour, they did achieve their stated goal of obtaining a high placing for Sánchez. The squad finished eighth in the teams classification.

=== Vuelta a España ===
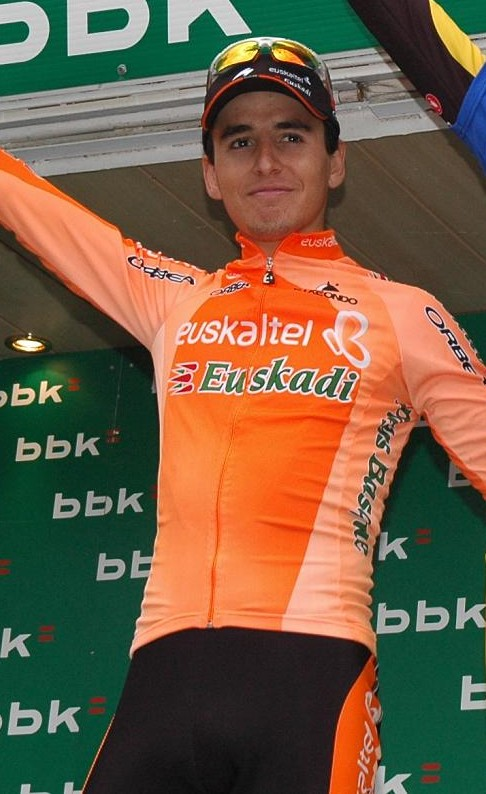
Igor Antón won two stages at the Vuelta, but he crashed and was forced to retire from the race in stage 14, when he was leading the overall standings.

Antón was the team's leader at the Vuelta a España, heading a squad of climbing specialists. They were 13th in the stage 1 team time trial, finishing with six riders 27 seconds off the winning time set by Team HTC–Columbia. Antón was third in the first mountain stage two days later, entering the top ten overall at seventh with the result. Antón was the winner the next day in a hilly stage that ended with a short but nearly vertical climb to Valdepeñas de Jaén. He had started his attack on the wall at the finish early, and faded in sight of the line, but held off Vincenzo Nibali and Peter Velits to claim the day's honors. The result moved him into second overall, 10 seconds behind race leader Philippe Gilbert and tied with Joaquim Rodríguez in third.

After three stages contested by sprinters, in which the overall standings did not change in any significant way, the next mountain stage was stage 8, ending with the Xorret de Catí climb. David Moncoutié won the stage after having been in the morning breakaway, but since previous race leader Gilbert finished two minutes back of the Vuelta's elite riders, Antón took the race leader's red jersey. Antón and Rodríguez had finished together, and Antón thought that Rodríguez would be the next to take it, having won bonus time in the stage's first intermediate sprint. Only after the stage did the riders learn that the sprint had been nullified due to a crash in the peloton shortly before it took place. Antón stated after the stage that he did not expect that he would contend for the Vuelta overall championship. Rodríguez tried again in the next stage to gain time, even just a single second, on Antón, so he could wear the red jersey when the Vuelta entered his home province of Catalonia in stage 10. The two again finished together, though, at the head of the elite group, for 15th and 16th on the day, behind a winning breakaway. Finally, during stage 10, Rodríguez took bonus time which counted, and claimed the red jersey with a margin of two seconds over Antón. Stage 11 was an important climbing stage, one sure to help define the overall classification. It concluded with a short but difficult climb to Vallnord in Andorra. With race leader Rodríguez distanced down the road, the red jersey was again up for grabs. Ezequiel Mosquera attacked first on the final climb, and rode well past Antón and the others, seeming poised to claim the stage win. As the climb went on, however, Antón regained his strength and rode past Mosquera in turn to take a second stage win, reclaiming the red jersey in the process with a 45-second lead over Nibali in second place. At this point, Antón had seemingly revised his expectations, now stating that he did feel he could contend for the overall.

The team's fortunes took a drastic turn in stage 14. At the foot of the stage-concluding Peña Cabarga climb, Antón and Martínez crashed after Antón hit a pothole. The crash also involved Caisse d'Epargne's Marzio Bruseghin. Martínez' collarbone was broken, and he lay on the road in pain for several minutes before being picked up by team staff. Antón tried at first to remount his bicycle, but in so doing he discovered that his right arm could not bend. He then climbed into his team car, red jersey torn to tatters, and abandoned the race. The peloton rode on after the crash at approximately 65 km/h (40 mph), meaning it was unlikely that they could chase back on even if they had been immediately able to remount their bicycles. The team rebounded for success in stage 16. About 100 km (62 mi) into the stage, Nieve, with the help of Oroz, bridged from the peloton up to the breakaway group. Having been in the peloton for much of the stage and in Oroz' slipstream during the bridge meant that Nieve was quite fresh for the finish at the Alto de Cotobello. He soloed to the stage win ahead of a surging Fränk Schleck in second. Nieve was the team's highest-placed rider at the end of the race, finishing 12th at a deficit of exactly 11 minutes to Vuelta champion Nibali. The squad finished eighth in the teams classification.

== Season victories ==
Date	Race	Competition	Rider	Country	Location
March 28	Volta a Catalunya, Sprints classification	UCI ProTour	Jonathan Castroviejo (ESP)	Spain	
April 8	Tour of the Basque Country, Stage 4	UCI ProTour	Samuel Sánchez (ESP)	Spain	Eibar
April 10	Tour of the Basque Country, Points classification	UCI ProTour	Samuel Sánchez (ESP) (Note: Sánchez originally finished second in the standings, but was upgraded to winner when all of Alejandro Valverde's results from 2010 were vacated.)	Spain	
April 11	Klasika Primavera	UCI Europe Tour	Samuel Sánchez (ESP)	Spain	Amorebieta
April 16	Vuelta a Castilla y León, Stage 3	UCI Europe Tour	Igor Antón (ESP)	Spain	Ponferrada
April 28	Vuelta a Asturias, Stage 1	UCI Europe Tour	Pablo Urtasun (ESP)	Spain	Llanes
April 30	Vuelta a Asturias, Stage 3b	UCI Europe Tour	Beñat Intxausti (ESP)	Spain	Piedras Blancas
May 2	Tour de Romandie, Stage 5	UCI ProTour	Igor Antón (ESP) (Note: Antón was originally second to Valverde, but was upgraded when Valverde's results for 2010 were all vacated)	Switzerland	Sion
May 26	Bayern-Rundfahrt, Stage 1	UCI Europe Tour	Rubén Pérez (ESP)	Germany	Viechtach
June 6	Tour de Luxembourg, Stage 4	UCI Europe Tour	Gorka Izagirre (ESP)	Luxembourg	Luxembourg
June 13	Critérium du Dauphiné, Mountains classification	UCI World Ranking	Egoi Martínez (ESP)	France	
June 13	Critérium du Dauphiné, Teams classification	UCI World Ranking	(Note: The riders on the squad were Samuel Sánchez, Jorge Azanza, Iñaki Isasi, Egoi Martínez, Alan Pérez, Romain Sicard, Iván Velasco, and Gorka Verdugo)	France	
July 25	Prueba Villafranca de Ordizia	UCI Europe Tour	Gorka Izagirre (ESP)	Spain	Ordizia
August 4	Vuelta a Burgos, Stage 1	UCI Europe Tour	Koldo Fernández (ESP)	Spain	Medina de Pomar
August 5	Vuelta a Burgos, Stage 2	UCI Europe Tour	Samuel Sánchez (ESP)	Spain	Miranda de Ebro
August 8	Vuelta a Burgos, Stage 5	UCI Europe Tour	Samuel Sánchez (ESP)	Spain	Lagunas de Neila
August 8	Vuelta a Burgos, Overall	UCI Europe Tour	Samuel Sánchez (ESP)	Spain	
August 8	Vuelta a Burgos, Points classification	UCI Europe Tour	Samuel Sánchez (ESP)	Spain	
August 31	Vuelta a España, Stage 4	UCI World Ranking	Igor Antón (ESP)	Spain	Valdepeñas de Jaén
September 8	Vuelta a España, Stage 11	UCI World Ranking	Igor Antón (ESP)	Andorra	Vallnord Sector Pal
September 13	Vuelta a España, Stage 16	UCI World Ranking	Mikel Nieve (ESP)	Spain	Alto de Cotobello
September 26	Tour de Vendée	UCI Europe Tour	Koldo Fernández (ESP)	France	La Roche Sur Yon
