= 2013 Euskaltel–Euskadi season =

2013 Euskaltel–Euskadi season
Manager	Igor González de Galdeano
One-day victories	1
Stage race overall victories	–
Stage race stage victories	3
Previous season

The 2013 season for Euskaltel–Euskadi began in January at the Tour Down Under. As a UCI ProTeam, they were automatically invited and obligated to send a squad to every event in the UCI World Tour.

== 2013 roster ==
As of 9 September 2013.

Rider	Date of birth
Jon Aberasturi (ESP)	28 March 1989 (aged 23)
Igor Antón (ESP)	2 March 1983 (aged 29)
Mikel Astarloza (ESP)	17 November 1979 (aged 33)
Jorge Azanza (ESP)	16 June 1982 (aged 30)
Pello Bilbao (ESP)	27 February 1990 (aged 22)
Garikoitz Bravo (ESP)	31 July 1989 (aged 23)
Tarik Chaoufi (Note: Chaoufi left the team on 13 August.) (MAR)	26 February 1986 (aged 26)
Ricardo García (ESP)	26 February 1988 (aged 24)
Gorka Izagirre (ESP)	7 October 1987 (aged 25)
Ion Izagirre (ESP)	4 February 1989 (aged 23)
Jure Kocjan (SLO)	18 October 1984 (aged 28)
Mikel Landa (ESP)	13 December 1989 (aged 23)
Juan José Lobato (ESP)	29 December 1988 (aged 24)
Egoi Martínez (ESP)	15 May 1978 (aged 34)
Ricardo Mestre (POR)	11 September 1983 (aged 29)

Rider	Date of birth
Miguel Mínguez (ESP)	30 August 1988 (aged 24)
Mikel Nieve (ESP)	26 May 1984 (aged 28)
Juan José Oroz (ESP)	7 November 1980 (aged 32)
Rubén Pérez (ESP)	30 October 1981 (aged 31)
Steffen Radochla (GER)	19 October 1978 (aged 34)
Adrián Sáez (ESP)	17 March 1986 (aged 26)
Samuel Sánchez (ESP)	5 February 1978 (aged 34)
André Schulze (GER)	21 November 1974 (aged 38)
Alexander Serebryakov (Note: Serebryakov was suspended from the team on 6 April, adverse analytical finding in an out-of-competition drugs test in March. He was later sacked.) (RUS)	25 September 1987 (aged 25)
Romain Sicard (FRA)	1 January 1988 (aged 25)
Ioannis Tamouridis (GRE)	3 June 1980 (aged 32)
Pablo Urtasun (ESP)	29 March 1980 (aged 32)
Gorka Verdugo (ESP)	4 November 1978 (aged 34)
Robert Vrečer (SLO)	8 October 1980 (aged 32)

Riders who joined the team for the 2013 season

Rider	2012 team
Jon Aberasturi	Orbea
Garikoitz Bravo	Caja Rural
Tarik Chaoufi	neo-pro
Jure Kocjan	Team Type 1–Sanofi
Juan José Lobato	Andalucía
Ricardo Mestre	Carmim–Prio
Steffen Radochla	Team NSP-Ghost
André Schulze	Team NetApp
Alexander Serebryakov	Team Type 1–Sanofi
Ioannis Tamouridis	SP Tableware
Robert Vrečer	Team Vorarlberg

Riders who left the team during or after the 2012 season

Rider	2013 team
Víctor Cabedo	Deceased
Pierre Cazaux	GSC Blagnac
Alan Pérez	Retired
Amets Txurruka	Caja Rural
Iván Velasco	Caja Rural

== Season victories ==
Date	Race	Competition	Rider	Country	Location
12 April	Vuelta a Castilla y León, Stage 1	UCI Europe Tour	Pablo Urtasun (ESP)	Spain	Valladolid
13 April	Vuelta a Castilla y León, Stage 2	UCI Europe Tour	Juan José Lobato (ESP)	Spain	Palencia
12 May	Vuelta a Asturias, Points classification	UCI Europe Tour	Mikel Landa (ESP)	Spain	
8 June	Critérium du Dauphiné, Stage 7	UCI World Tour	Samuel Sánchez (ESP)	Spain	SuperDévoluy
16 June	Tour de Suisse, Mountains classification	UCI World Tour	Robert Vrečer (SLO)	Switzerland	
16 June	Tour de Suisse, Sprints classification	UCI World Tour	Robert Vrečer (SLO)	Switzerland	
31 July	Circuito de Getxo	UCI Europe Tour	Juan José Lobato (ESP)	Spain	Getxo
15 September	Vuelta a España, Teams classification	UCI World Tour	(Note: The riders on the squad were Samuel Sánchez, Igor Antón, Jorge Azanza, Mikel Landa, Egoi Martínez, Mikel Nieve, Juan José Oroz, Pablo Urtasun and Gorka Verdugo)	Spain	
