= Salvador Guardiola =

Spanish cyclist

Personal information
- Full name: Salvador Guardiola Torá
- Born: 5 September 1988 (age 38) Jumilla, Spain
- Height: 1.85 m (6 ft 1 in)
- Weight: 65 kg (143 lb)

Cycling career
- Sport: Cycling
- Discipline: Road
- Role: Rider

Amateur teams
- 2008: Cafemax–Contempolis
- 2009: Contentpolis–Ampo (stagiaire)
- 2010: Asfaltos Guerola–CA Valencia Terra i Mar

Professional teams
- 2010–2012: Heraklion Kastro–Murcia
- 2013: Differdange–Losch
- 2014: PinoRoad
- 2014–2017: Team UKYO
- 2018–2021: Kinan Cycling Team

Salvador Guardiola Torá (born 5 September 1988) is a Spanish cyclist, who last rode for UCI Continental team Kinan Cycling Team.

== Major results ==
2012
10th Overall Tour of Greece
2014
8th Tour de Okinawa
2015
3rd Overall Tour de Hokkaido
2016
5th Overall Sharjah International Cycling Tour
7th Overall Tour de Filipinas
9th UAE Cup
2017
4th Klasika Primavera
5th Overall Tour de Tochigi

1st Stage 1

5th Overall Tour of China II
6th Overall Tour de Hokkaido
7th Overall Tour de Filipinas
9th Overall Tour de Korea
2018
5th Overall Tour de Kumano
9th Overall Tour de Ijen
2019
4th Overall Tour of Thailand
6th Overall Tour de Siak
