= Kaiku =

Cycling team

Team information
- UCI code: KAI
- Registered: Spain
- Founded: 2005
- Disbanded: 2006
- Discipline: Road
- Status: UCI Professional Continental

Key personnel
- General manager: Eneko Garate
- Team managers: Óscar Guerrero; Juan Hernández; Juan Campos

Team name history
- 2005–2006: Kaiku

Kaiku (UCI team code: KAI) was a Spanish UCI Professional Continental cycling team based in the Basque country that participated in UCI Continental Circuits races and when selected as a wildcard to UCI ProTour events.

The team was managed by Eneko Garate with assistance from directeur sportifs Óscar Guerrero, Juan Hernández and Juan Campos.

The lead sponsor, Kaiku Corporación Alimentaria, is a Basque country dairy products company in which Caja Rural de Navarra at one time held a financial stake.

In its first season, 2005, Kaiku, a.k.a. "Kaiku–Caja Rural", was formed from Caja Rural's amateur team. Kaiku Corporación had in the previous 22 years sponsored amateur teams that had featured riders who later became famous, such as Juan Antonio Flecha, Joseba Beloki, Juan Carlos Domínguez, Miguel Ángel Martín Perdiguero, Mikel Zarrabeitia, and Abraham Olano, but the company had not sponsored any team in the previous 5 years.

== 2006 squad ==
Name	Birthdate	Nationality
Jorge Azanza	16.06.1982	Spain
Antonio Berasategui	24.01.1978	Spain
Jon Bru	18.10.1977	Spain
Carlos Castaño	07.05.1979	Spain
Gustavo César	29.01.1980	Spain
Dionisio Galparsoro	13.08.1978	Spain
Rodrigo García	27.02.1980	Spain
Ivan Gilmartín	14.04.1983	Spain
José López	11.07.1976	Spain
Alberto Losada	28.02.1982	Spain
Israel Núñez	31.05.1979	Spain
Rubén Oarbeascoa	21.11.1975	Spain
Juan Oroz	11.07.1980	Spain
Adrián Palomares	18.02.1976	Spain
Javier Ruiz de Larrínaga	02.11.1979	Spain
Ricardo Serrano	04.08.1978	Spain
Fernando Serrano	19.01.1979	Spain
Pablo Urtasun	29.03.1980	Spain
