= 2014 Vuelta a Murcia =

Race details
- Dates: 1 March 2014
- Stages: 1
- Distance: 190.8 km (118.6 mi)
- Winning time: 5h 06' 53"

Results
	Winner	Alejandro Valverde (ESP)
	Second	Tiago Machado (POR)
	Third	Davide Rebellin (ITA)

The 2014 Vuelta a Murcia was the 30th professional edition of the Vuelta a Murcia cycle race and was held on 1 March 2014. The race started in Beniel and finished at the Castle of Lorca. The race was won by Alejandro Valverde.

== General classification ==
Final general classification

Rank	Rider	Time
1	Alejandro Valverde (ESP)	5h 06' 53"
2	Tiago Machado (POR)	+ 3"
3	Davide Rebellin (ITA)	+ 3"
4	Luis Ángel Maté (ESP)	+ 5"
5	José Joaquín Rojas (ESP)	+ 7"
6	Rubén Fernández (ESP)	+ 7"
7	José Mendes (POR)	+ 9"
8	David Arroyo (ESP)	+ 9"
9	Miguel Mínguez (ESP)	+ 9"
10	Daniel Navarro (ESP)	+ 14"
