= Jon Larrinaga =

Spanish cyclist

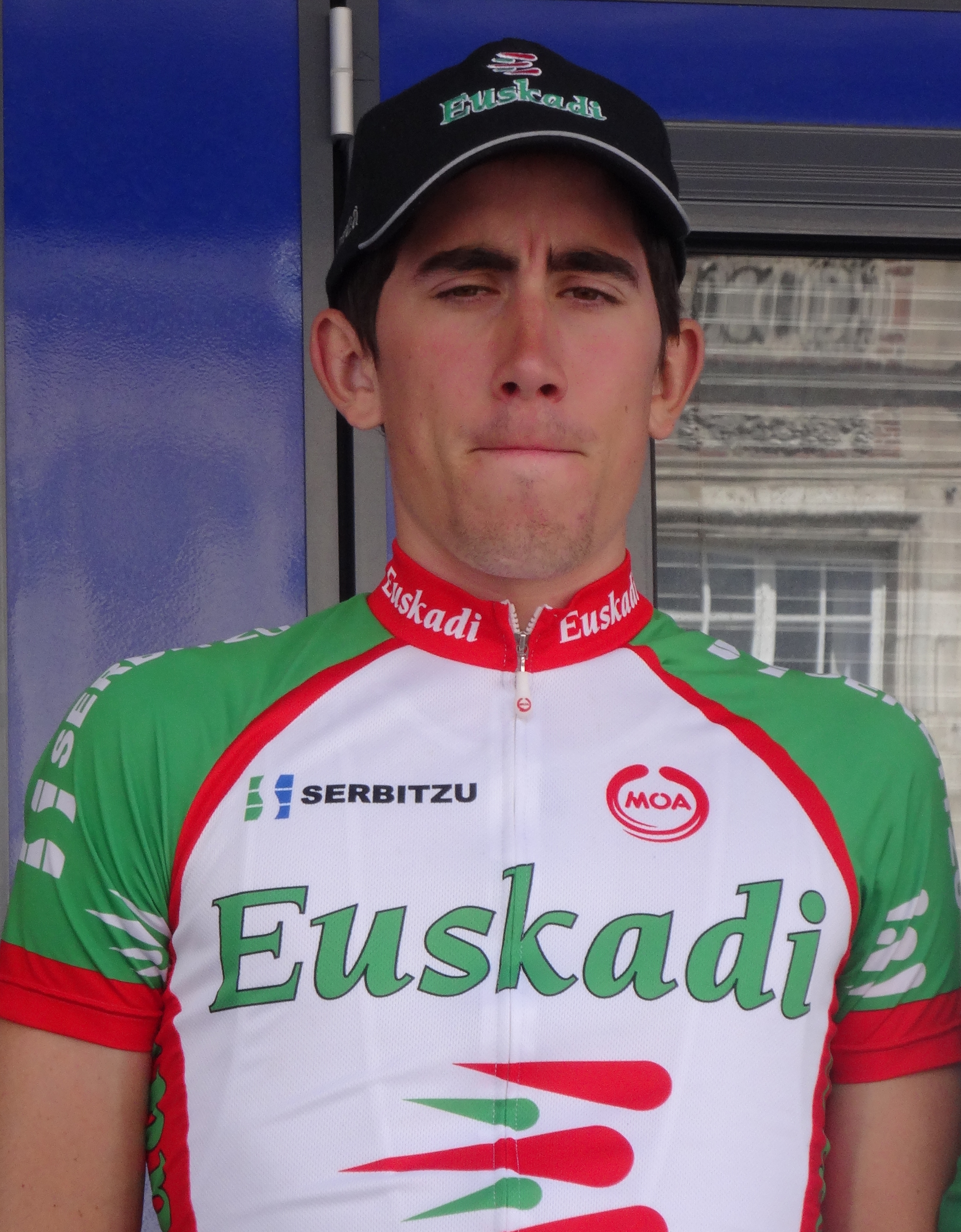

Personal information
- Full name: Jon Larrinaga Muguruza
- Born: 20 November 1990 (age 35) Amurrio, Spain

Cycling career
- Sport: Cycling
- Discipline: Road
- Role: Rider

Amateur team
- 2015: GSC Blagnac VS31

Professional team
- 2013–2014: Euskadi

Jon Larrinaga Muguruza (born 20 November 1990 in Amurrio) is a Spanish cyclist.

== Major results ==
2013
1st Overall Tour de Gironde

1st Stage 2

1st Stage 2 Troféu Joaquim Agostinho
