= PinoRoad =

Team information
- UCI code: PNR
- Registered: Chile
- Founded: 2014
- Disbanded: 2014
- Discipline: Road
- Status: UCI Continental
- Bicycles: Berria

Key personnel
- General manager: Juan Pablo Pino
- Team manager: Jesús Buendía

Team name history
- 2014: PinoRoad

PinoRoad was a Chilean UCI Continental cycling team that existed only for the 2014 season.

== 2014 Roster ==
Rider	Date of birth
Pablo Alarcón (CHI)	15 May 1988 (age 38)
Adrián Alvarado (CHI)	14 August 1991 (age 35)
Mikel Bizkarra (ESP)	21 August 1989 (age 37)
Edison Bravo (CHI)	22 February 1992 (age 34)
Wolfgang Burmann (CHI)	10 February 1991 (age 35)
Salvador Guardiola (ESP)	5 September 1988 (age 38)
Cristopher Mansilla (CHI)	24 May 1990 (age 36)

Rider	Date of birth
Luis Mansilla (CHI)	26 July 1986 (age 40)
Juan José Oroz (ESP)	11 July 1980 (age 46)
Pedro Palma (CHI)	24 January 1989 (age 37)
Pablo Seisdedos (CHI)	26 January 1988 (age 38)
Elías Tello (CHI)	29 April 1994 (age 32)
Pablo Urtasun (ESP)	29 March 1980 (age 46)
