= Adrián Sáez =

Spanish cyclist

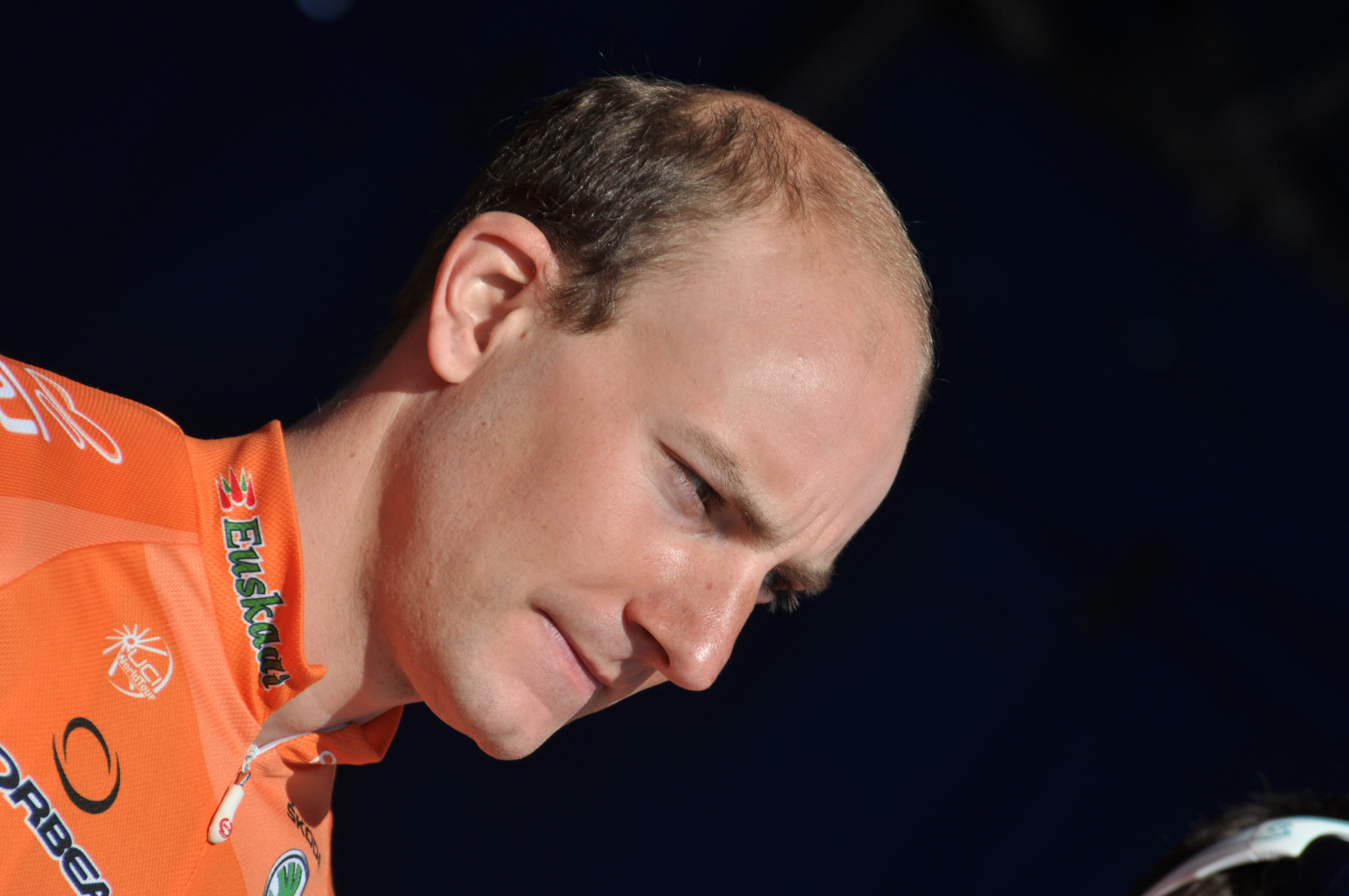

Personal information
- Full name: Adrián Sáez de Arregi Egurrola
- Born: March 17, 1986 (age 40) Araia, Spain

Cycling career
- Sport: Cycling
- Current team: Retired
- Discipline: Road
- Role: Rider

Amateur team
- 2005–2009: Caja Rural amateur

Professional teams
- 2010–2011: Orbea
- 2012–2013: Euskaltel–Euskadi

Adrián Sáez de Arregi Egurrola (born 17 March 1986 in Araia) is a Spanish former professional cyclist. He participated in the 2012 Giro d'Italia.

== Major results ==
2011
3rd Cinturó de Empordà
4th Tour de Gironde
