= Sergio De Lis =

Spanish cyclist

Sergio de Lis
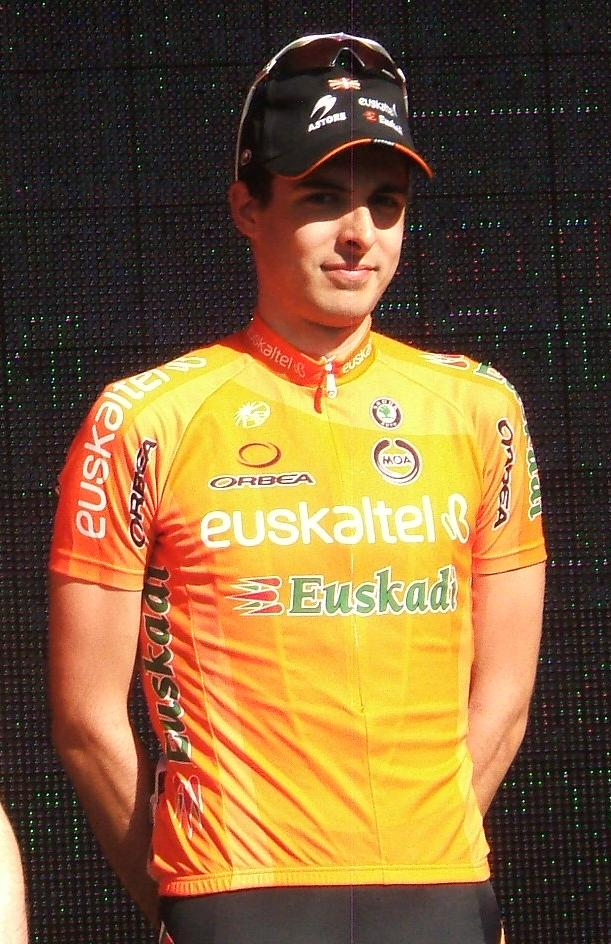
- Sergio de Lis at the 2009 Tour Down Under

Personal information
- Full name: Sergio de Lis de Andrés
- Born: 19 May 1986 (age 40) San Sebastián, Spain

Cycling career
- Sport: Cycling
- Current team: Retired
- Discipline: Road
- Role: Retired

Professional teams
- 2008: Orbea–Oreka SDA
- 2009–2010: Euskaltel–Euskadi

Sergio de Lis de Andrés (born 19 May 1986 in San Sebastián, Basque Country) is a Spanish former professional road bicycle racer who rode for two seasons for UCI ProTour team Euskaltel–Euskadi. He retired at the age of 24, citing family reasons.
