= 2010 Bayern Rundfahrt =

Race details
- Dates: 26–30 May 2010
- Stages: 5
- Distance: 752 km (467.3 mi)
- Winning time: 18h 31' 38"

Results
	Winner	Maxime Monfort (BEL)
	Second	Adriano Malori (ITA)
	Third	Simon Špilak (SLO)

The 2010 Bayern Rundfahrt was the 31st edition of the Bayern Rundfahrt cycle race and was held on 26 May to 30 May 2010. The race started in Erding and finished in Fürstenfeldbruck. The race was won by Maxime Monfort.

== General classification ==
Final general classification

Rank	Rider	Time
1	Maxime Monfort (BEL)	18h 31' 38"
2	Adriano Malori (ITA)	+ 12"
3	Simon Špilak (SLO)	+ 49"
4	Simon Geschke (GER)	+ 59"
5	Christophe Riblon (FRA)	+ 1' 00"
6	Nelson Oliveira (POR)	+ 1' 04"
7	Stefan Denifl (AUT)	+ 1' 04"
8	Kristof Vandewalle (BEL)	+ 1' 06"
9	Igor Antón (ESP)	+ 1' 10"
10	Romain Sicard (FRA)	+ 1' 10"
