= Josu Agirre =

Spanish professional road bicycle racer

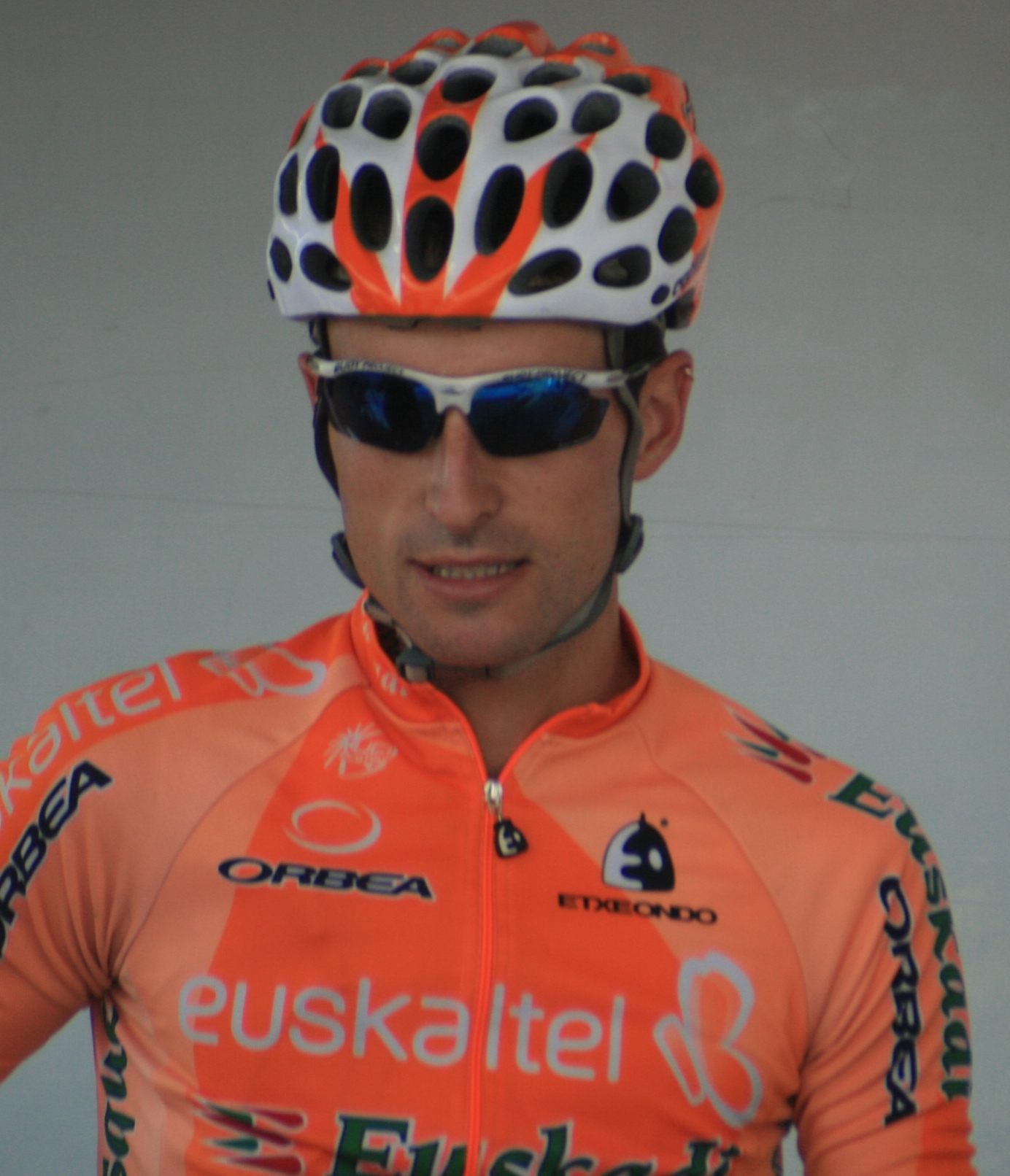

Personal information
- Full name: Josu Agirre Aseginolaza
- Born: 23 May 1981 (age 45) Tolosa, Spain

Cycling career
- Sport: Cycling
- Current team: Unattached
- Discipline: Road
- Role: Rider

Amateur team
- 2006–2007: Orbea

Professional teams
- 2004: LPR-Piacenza
- 2008–2009: Euskaltel–Euskadi

Josu Agirre Aseginolaza (born 23 May 1981 in Tolosa) is a Spanish professional road bicycle racer.

== Major results ==
2004
1st Stage 2 Giro delle Valli Cuneesi nelle Alpi del Mare
2006
1st Stage 1 Vuelta a la Comunidad de Madrid
2007
5th Overall Vuelta a Navarra
