= Daniel Sesma =

Spanish cyclist

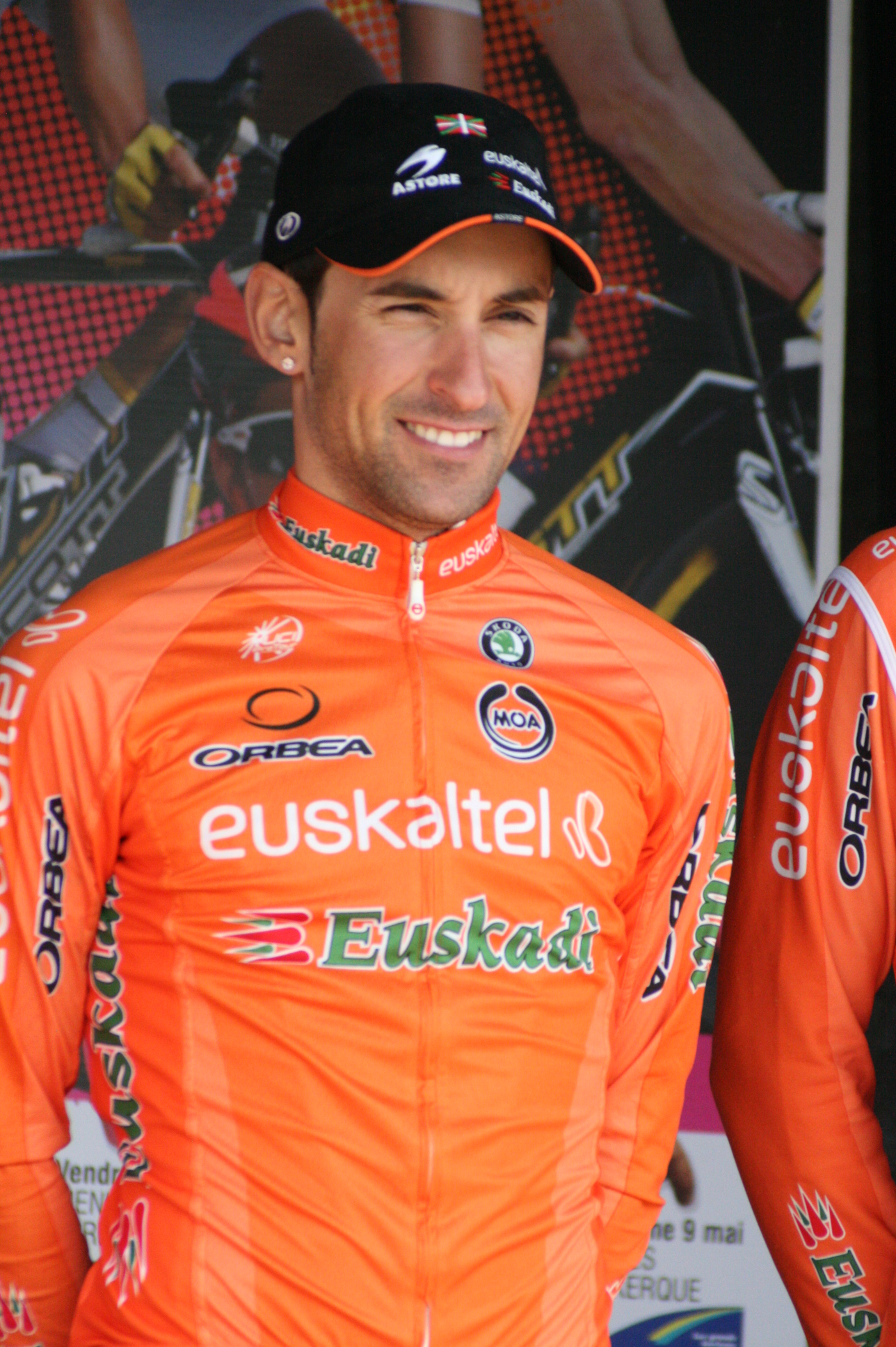

Personal information
- Full name: Daniel Sesma Sorbet
- Born: 28 June 1984 (age 42) Pamplona, Spain

Cycling career
- Sport: Cycling
- Current team: Retired
- Discipline: Road
- Role: Rider

Professional teams
- 2008–2009: Orbea–Oreka SDA
- 2010–2011: Euskaltel–Euskadi

Daniel Sesma (born 18 June 1984) is a Spanish former road cyclist. He rode in the 2011 Giro d'Italia, finishing 149th overall.

== Major results ==
2008
1st Stage 1 Vuelta a Navarra
