= Víctor Cabedo =

Spanish cyclist

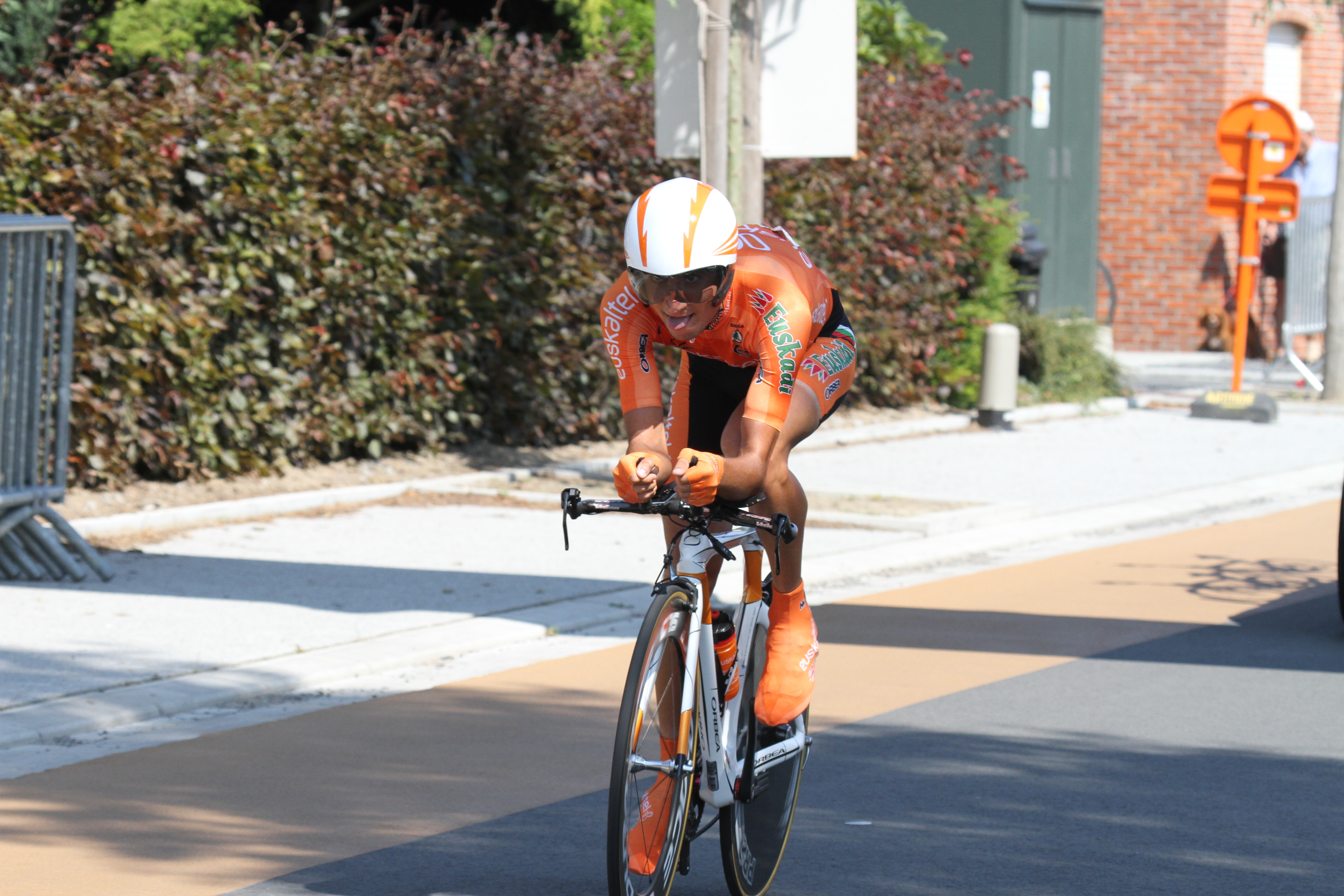

Personal information
- Full name: Víctor Cabedo Carda
- Born: 15 June 1989 Onda, Spain
- Died: 19 September 2012 (aged 23) Almedíjar, Spain

Cycling career
- Sport: Cycling
- Discipline: Road
- Role: Rider

Professional teams
- 2011: Orbea
- 2012: Euskaltel–Euskadi

Víctor Cabedo Carda (15 June 1989 – 19 September 2012) was a Spanish professional road racing cyclist. He rode for Euskaltel–Euskadi for one season. He died following a collision with a vehicle while on a training ride.

In 2012 he rode his only grand tour, the Giro d'Italia. Cabedo finished 129th overall helping teammate Mikel Nieve to 10th place in the overall standings.

His younger brother Óscar Cabedo rides for Burgos Burpellet BH.

== Major results ==
2006
1st Stage 3b Vuelta al Besaya
2007
National Junior Road Championships

2nd Time trial

1st Overall Vuelta al Besaya

1st Points classification
1st Stages 2 & 4a (ITT)

6th Overall Tour du Pays de Vaud
2011
1st Stage 5 Vuelta a Asturias
5th Klasika Primavera
