= Miguel Mínguez =

Spanish cyclist

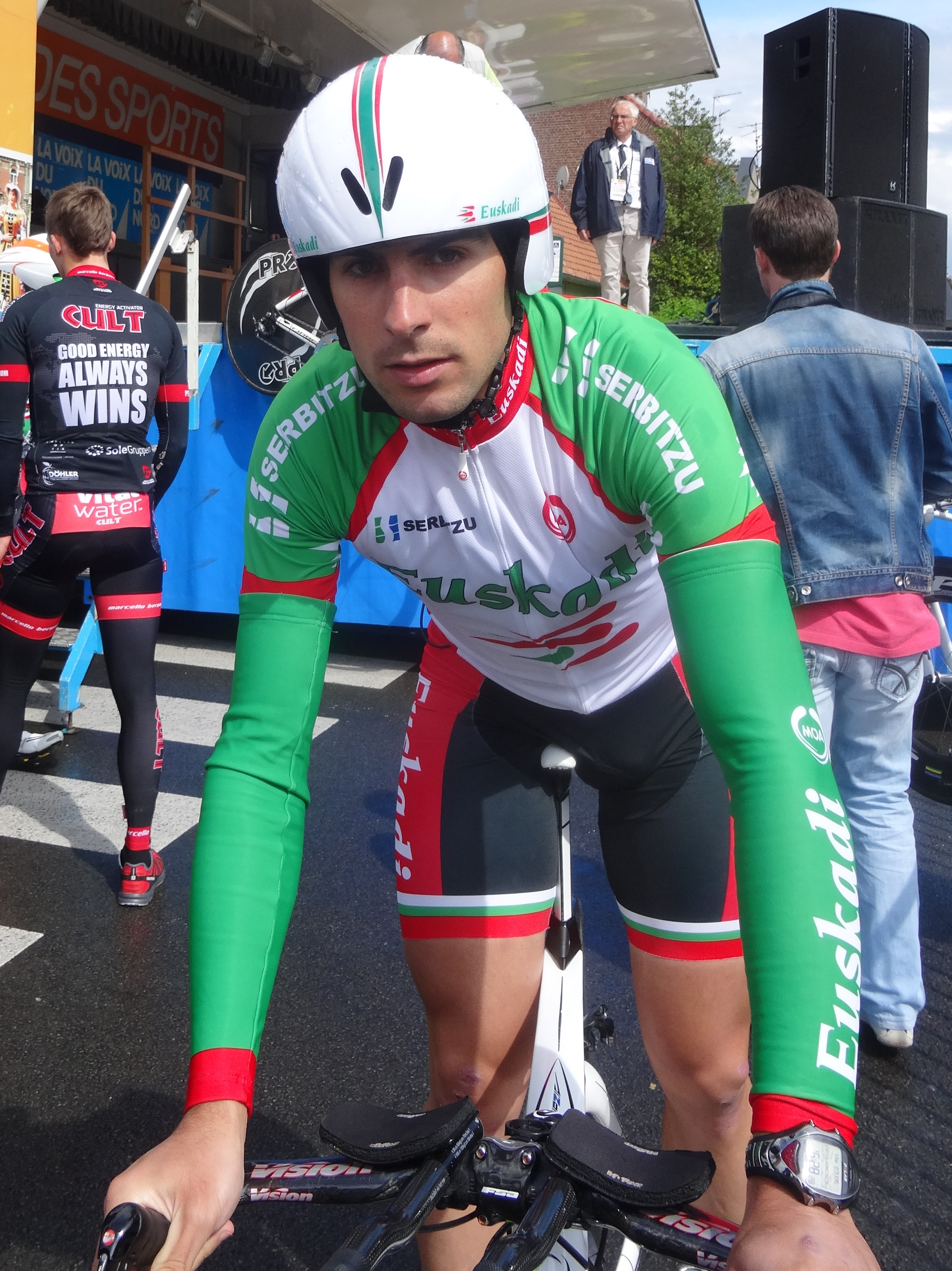

Personal information
- Born: 30 August 1988 (age 38) Bilbao, Spain

Cycling career
- Sport: Cycling
- Current team: Retired
- Discipline: Road
- Role: Rider

Amateur team
- 2007: Suminan–Koplad

Professional teams
- 2008–2009: Orbea–Oreka SDA
- 2010–2013: Euskaltel–Euskadi
- 2014: Euskadi

Miguel Mínguez Ayala (born 30 August 1988 in Bilbao) is a Spanish cyclist. He participated in 3 Giro d'Italias.

== Career achievements ==
=== Major results ===
2008
1st Stage 1 Vuelta a Navarra (TTT)
2009
10th Overall Cinturó de l'Empordà
2014
5th Klasika Primavera
9th Vuelta a Murcia
10th GP Miguel Indurain

=== Grand Tour general classification results timeline ===
Grand Tour	2011	2012	2013
Giro d'Italia	134	157	165
Tour de France	—	—	—
Vuelta a España	—	—	—

Legend
—	Did not compete
DNF	Did not finish
