= Juan José Oroz =

Spanish cyclist

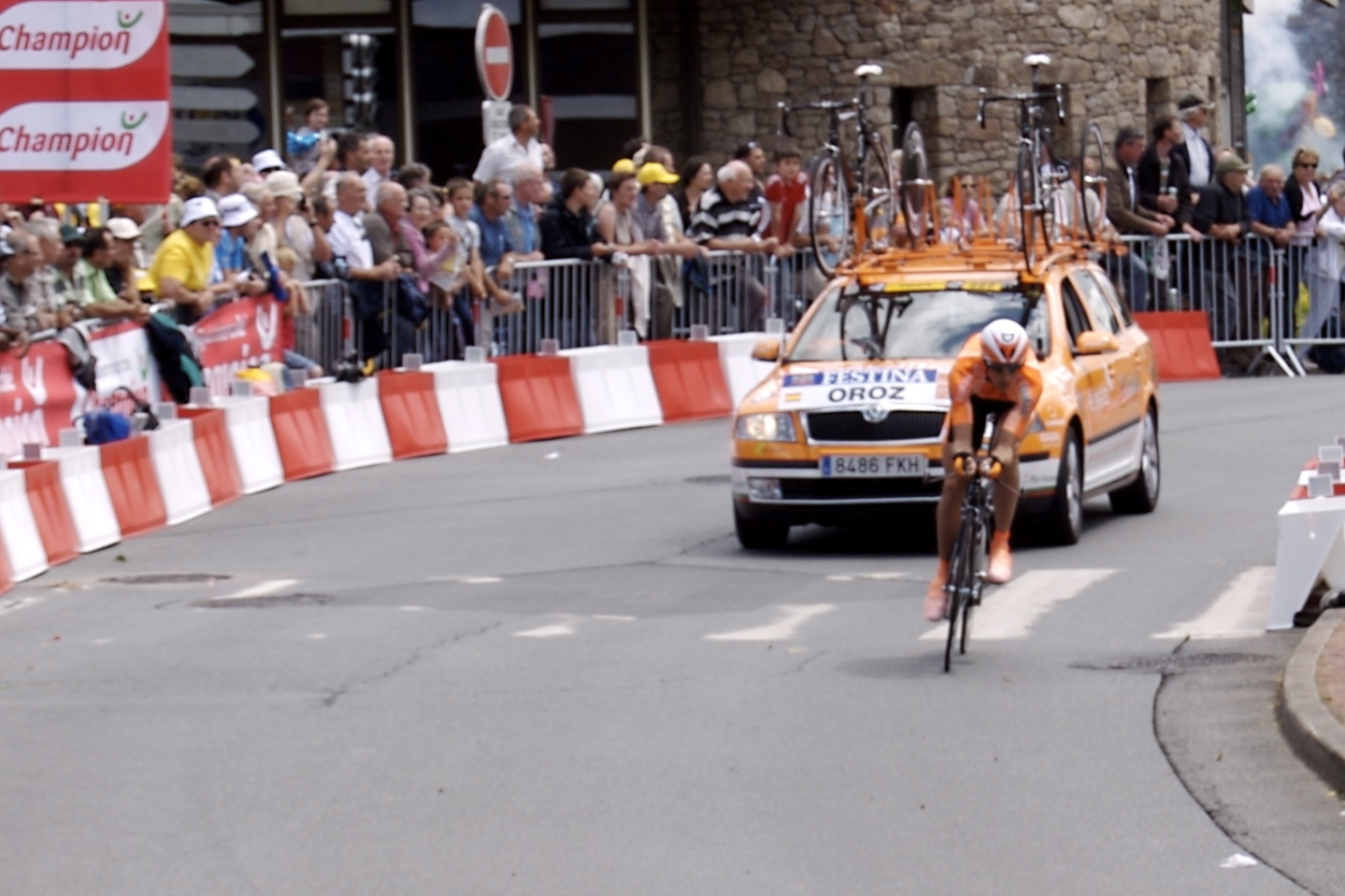
- Oroz at the 2008 Tour de France.

Personal information
- Full name: Juan José Oroz Ugalde
- Nickname: Juanjo
- Born: 11 July 1980 (age 46) Pamplona, Spain
- Height: 1.87 m (6 ft 2 in)
- Weight: 71 kg (157 lb; 11.2 st)

Cycling career
- Sport: Cycling
- Current team: Equipo Kern Pharma
- Discipline: Road
- Role: Rider (retired); Directeur sportif; General manager

Professional teams
- 2006: Kaiku
- 2007: Orbea–Oreka SDA
- 2007–2013: Euskaltel–Euskadi
- 2014: PinoRoad
- 2014: Burgos BH

Managerial teams
- 2015–2019: Lizarte
- 2020–: Equipo Kern Pharma

Juan José Oroz Ugalde (born 11 July 1980 in Pamplona, Navarre) is a Spanish former professional road bicycle racer, who rode professionally between 2006 and 2014 for the Kaiku, Orbea–Oreka SDA, Euskaltel–Euskadi, PinoRoad, and Burgos BH teams. He now works as the general manager of UCI ProTeam Equipo Kern Pharma.

Between October 2007 and April 2008, Oroz was the only professional cyclist to complete all Five Monuments of Cycling, including Giro di Lombardia, Milan–San Remo, Tour of Flanders, Paris–Roubaix and Liège–Bastogne–Liège.

== Major results ==
2009
6th Overall Vuelta a Andalucía
7th Overall Critérium International
2010
8th GP Miguel Indurain
2014
6th Overall Tour de Korea

1st Stage 3
