= Iván Velasco =

Spanish cyclist

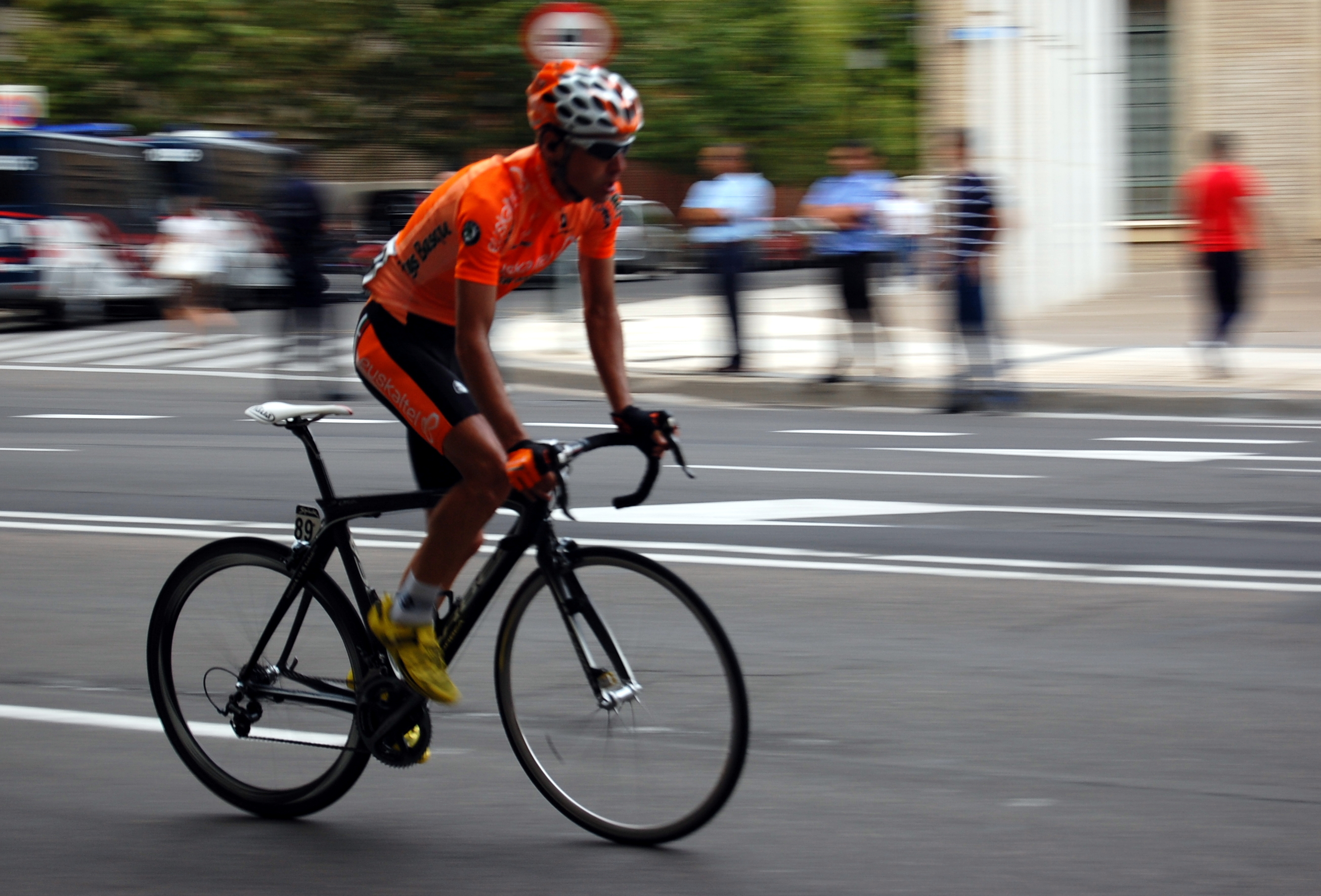
- Velasco at the 2008 Vuelta a España.

Personal information
- Full name: Iván Velasco Murillo
- Born: 7 February 1980 (age 46) Mondragón, Spain
- Height: 1.77 m (5 ft 10 in)
- Weight: 65 kg (143 lb)

Cycling career
- Sport: Cycling
- Current team: Retired
- Discipline: Road
- Role: Rider
- Rider type: Climber

Amateur teams
- 2002–2003: Ruta de Europa
- 2004–2005: Serbitzu–Kirolgi

Professional teams
- 2006: Orbea
- 2007–2012: Euskaltel–Euskadi
- 2013–2014: Caja Rural

Iván Velasco Murillo (born 7 February 1980 in Mondragón, Basque Country) is a Spanish former road bicycle racer, who competed professionally between 2006 and 2014 for the Orbea, Euskaltel–Euskadi and Caja Rural–Seguros RGA teams.

== Biography ==
He was excluded from the 2012 Giro d'Italia for serious misconduct. At the end of the year, Velasco's contract with Euskaltel-Euskadi was not renewed by Igor González de Galdeano, the team manager, because he did not earn enough UCI points to keep his team in the UCI World Tour .

The Spanish runner announced his retirement from sport at the end of the 2014 season.

In 2019, he joined the XDS Astana Team, with the role of developing the team's products.

== Major results ==
2012
9th Overall Vuelta a Castilla y León
10th Overall Vuelta a La Rioja
