= Pierre Cazaux =

French road cyclist

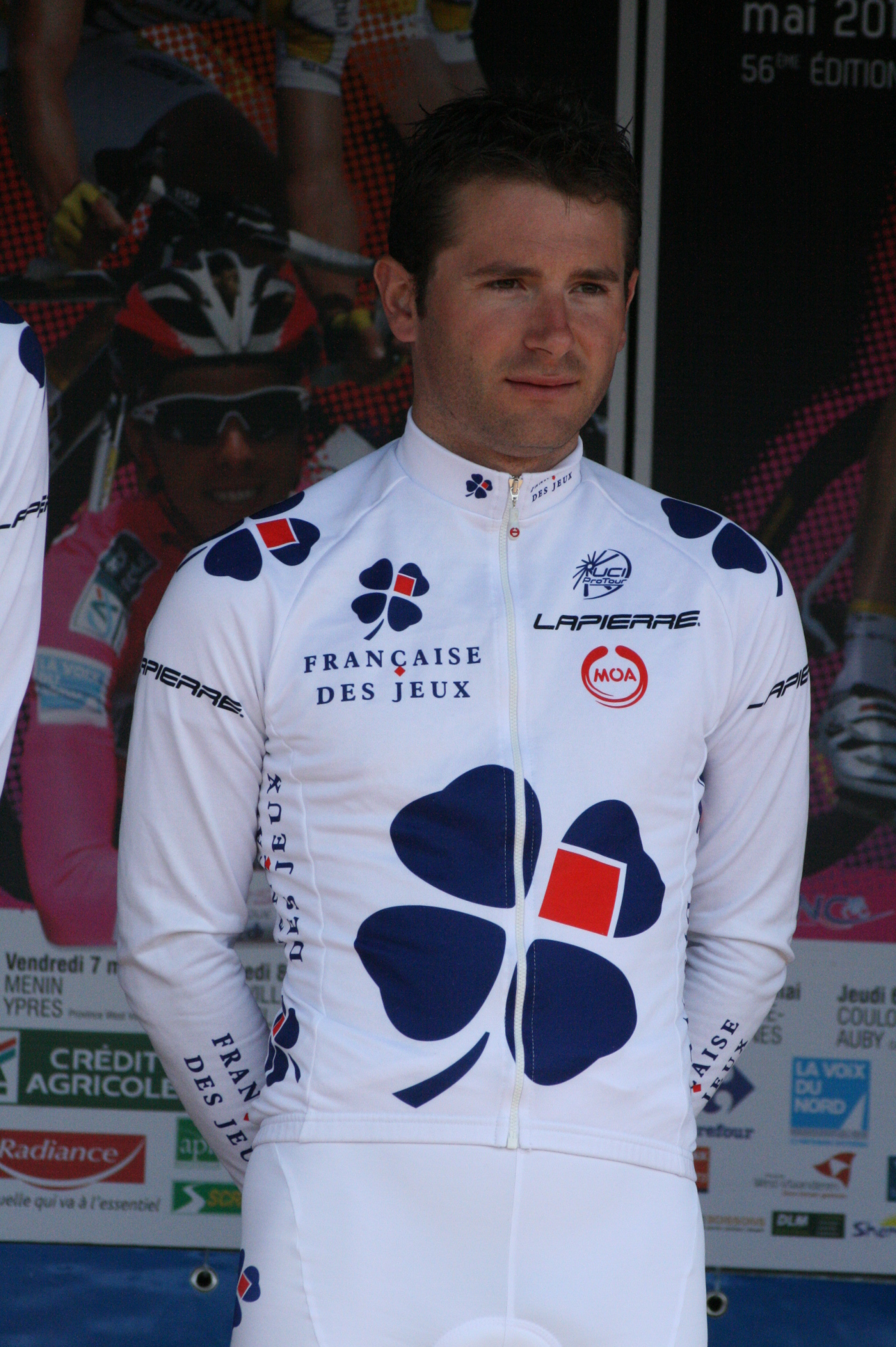
- Cazaux at the 2010 Four Days of Dunkirk

Personal information
- Full name: Pierre Cazaux
- Born: 7 June 1984 (age 42) Saint-Palais, France

Cycling career
- Sport: Cycling
- Current team: Retired
- Discipline: Road
- Role: Rider

Amateur teams
- 2007–2009: Roubaix–Lille Métropole
- 2013–2014: GSC Blagnac

Professional teams
- 2010: Française des Jeux
- 2011–2012: Euskaltel–Euskadi

Pierre Cazaux (born 7 June 1984) is a French former road cyclist. Cazaux had previously competed as a professional for the Française des Jeux and Euskaltel–Euskadi teams; he became the third non-Spanish rider to ride for Euskaltel–Euskadi, being eligible because of his birth in the French Basque Country.

== Biography ==
Pierre Cazaux began his professional career in 2008 with the Van Rysel–Roubaix continental team, with a reputation as an offensive rider acquired in the amateur ranks with Entente Sud Gascogne. He finishes tenth in his first professional race, the Grand Prix d'ouverture La Marseillaise. His best result in an international race was fourth place in the Tour du Doubs.

In 2009, he was fourth in the Classic Loire Atlantique, fifth in the Boucles de l'Aulne, eighth in Paris–Corrèze and ninth in the Trophée des Grimpeurs. In 2010, he was recruited by the Groupama–FDJ, including a long breakaway in stage 3 of the Four Days of Dunkirk.

Finishes 5th in the queen mountain stage of the 2010 Tour of Spain.

In 2011, he joined the Euskaltel–Euskadi (1994–2013) team. At the end of 2012, he was not retained by his team as he had not scored any UCI points.

In 2013, he joined GSC Blagnac Vélo Sport 31.

He plans to stop at the end of the 2014 season. He finally stopped on June 15, in the middle of the season, at the end of Pamplona-Bayonne, where he was the titleholder.

== Major results ==
2007
6th Overall Tour des Pyrénées
2008
4th Tour du Doubs
2009
4th Classic Loire Atlantique
5th Boucles de l'Aulne
8th Overall Paris–Corrèze
9th Trophée des Grimpeurs

=== Grand Tour general classification results timeline ===
Grand Tour	2010	2011	2012
Giro d'Italia	—	123	122
Tour de France	—	—	—
Vuelta a España	110	147	—

Legend
DSQ	Disqualified
DNF	Did not finish
