= Alan Pérez (cyclist) =

Spanish cyclist

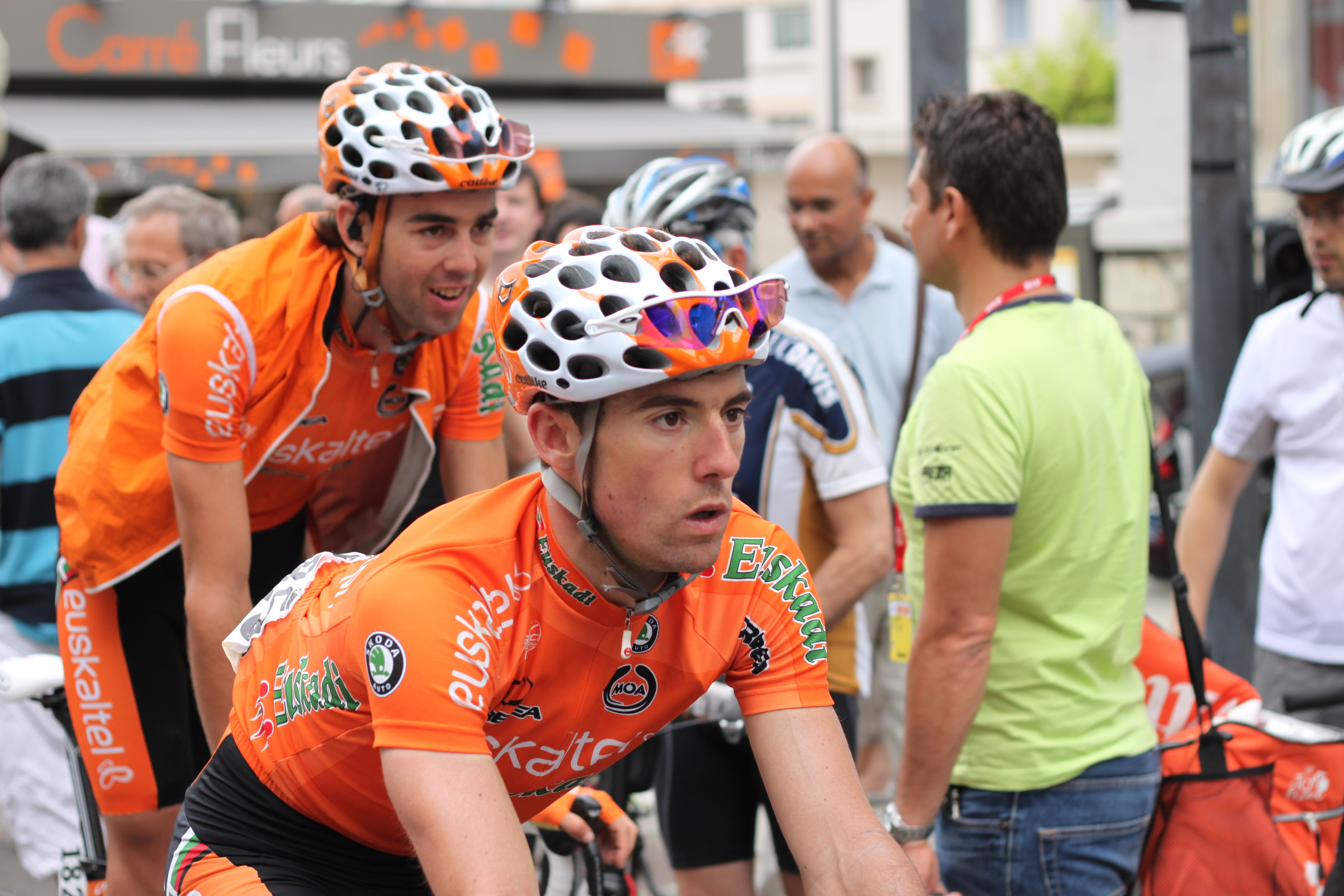
- Pérez at the 2010 Critérium du Dauphiné.

Personal information
- Full name: Alan Pérez Lezaun
- Born: 15 July 1982 (age 44) Yerri, Spain
- Height: 1.75 m (5 ft 9 in)
- Weight: 66 kg (146 lb)

Cycling career
- Sport: Cycling
- Current team: Retired
- Discipline: Road
- Role: Rider
- Rider type: Break away specialist

Amateur teams
- 2001: Tegui Videoporteros
- 2002: Bodegas Castillo de Monjardín
- 2003–2004: Orbea–Olarra–Consultec

Professional teams
- 2005–2006: Orbea
- 2006–2012: Euskaltel–Euskadi

Alan Pérez Lezaun (born 15 July 1982 in Yerri, Navarre) is a Spanish retired professional road bicycle racer. He competed as a professional between 2005 and 2012, for the Orbea and Euskaltel–Euskadi teams.

== Major results ==
2004
1st Stage 4 Vuelta a Navarra
4th Time trial, National Under-23 Road Championships

=== Grand Tour general classification results timeline ===
Grand Tour	2007	2008	2009	2010	2011
Giro d'Italia	—	72	—	—	—
Tour de France	—	—	DNF	129	94
Vuelta a España	94	69	92	—	—

Legend
—	Did not compete
DNF	Did not finish
