= Rubén Pérez (cyclist) =

Spanish cyclist

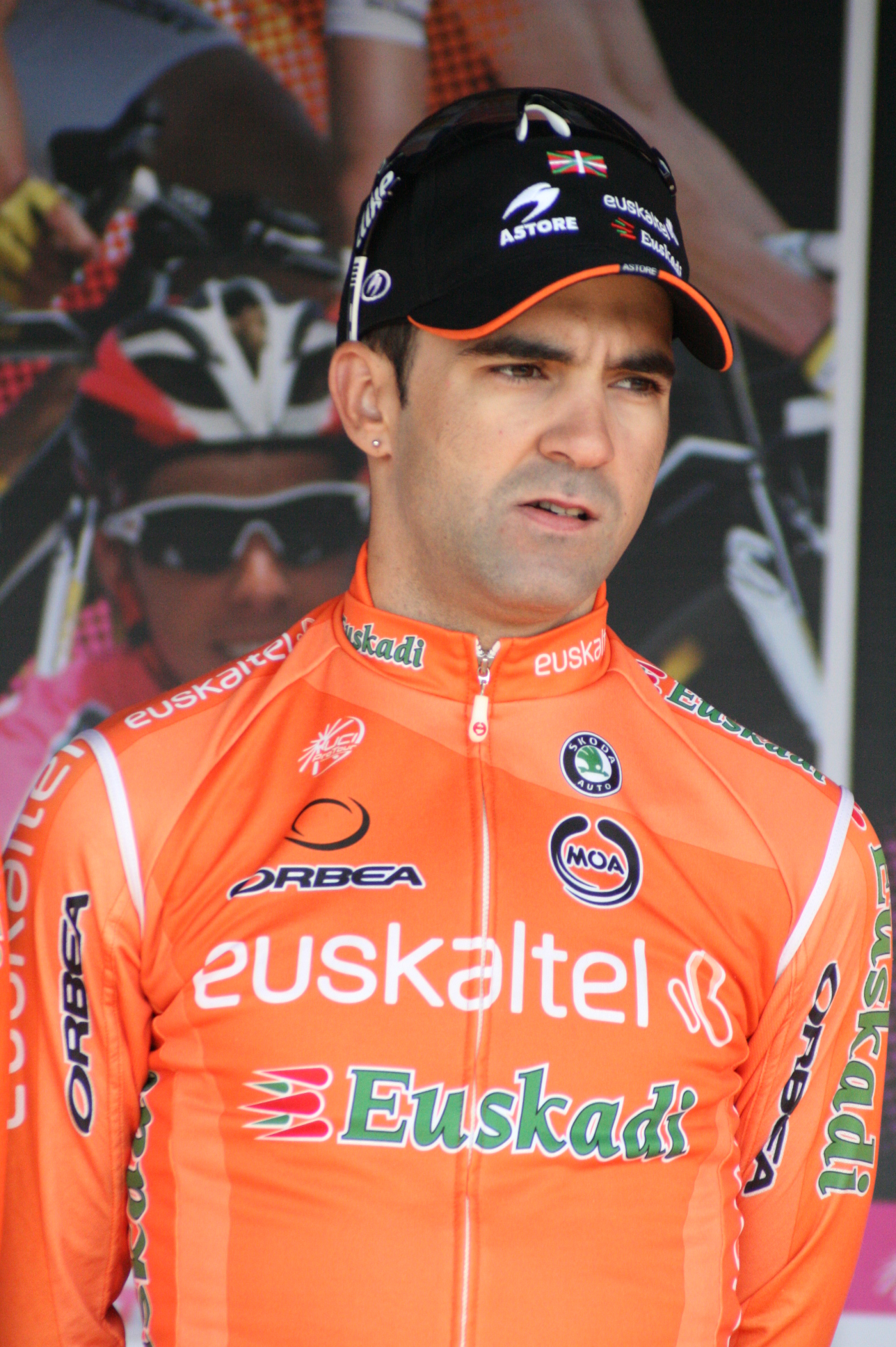
- Pérez at the 2010 Four Days of Dunkirk

Personal information
- Full name: Rubén Pérez Moreno
- Born: 30 October 1981 (age 44) Zaldibar, Spain
- Height: 1.73 m (5 ft 8 in)
- Weight: 62 kg (137 lb; 9.8 st)

Cycling career
- Sport: Cycling
- Discipline: Road
- Role: Rider
- Rider type: Breakaway specialist

Professional teams
- 2005: Orbea
- 2005–2013: Euskaltel–Euskadi

Rubén Pérez Moreno (born 30 October 1981 in Zaldibar, Basque Country) is a Spanish Basque professional road bicycle racer, who last rode for UCI ProTour team Euskaltel–Euskadi.

His only victory has been a stage in the Tour of Bavaria in 2010, before that he made his Vuelta a España debut (69th) in 2006 and his Tour de France debut in 2007.

== Major results ==
1997
2nd National Under-17 Cyclo-Cross Championships
2009
5th Clásica de Almería
8th Clásica de San Sebastián
2010
1st Stage 1 Bayern-Rundfahrt
4th Gran Premio Miguel Indurain
9th Trofeo Magaluf
9th Clásica de Almería
2013
7th Circuito de Getxo
