= Jorge Azanza =

Spanish professional road bicycle racer

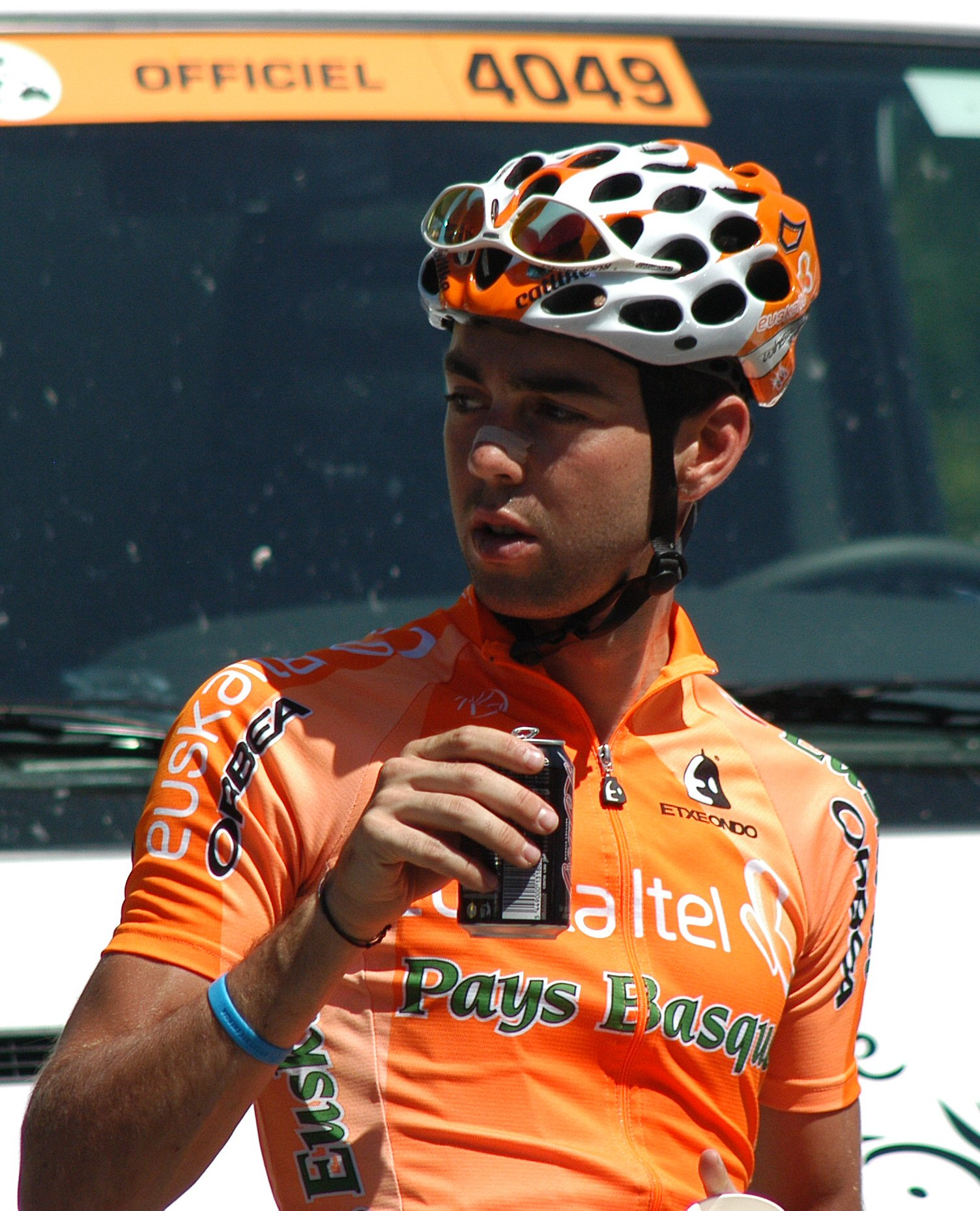
- Azanza at the 2007 Tour de France.

Personal information
- Full name: Jorge Azanza Soto
- Born: 16 June 1982 (age 44) Alsasua, Navarre, Spain
- Height: 1.84 m (6 ft 1/2 in)
- Weight: 67 kg (148 lb)

Cycling career
- Sport: Cycling
- Current team: Retired
- Discipline: Road
- Role: Rider

Professional teams
- 2005–2006: Kaiku
- 2007–2013: Euskaltel–Euskadi

Major wins
- Vuelta a Cordoba 2004

Jorge Azanza Soto (born 16 June 1982 in Alsasua, Navarre) is a Spanish former professional road bicycle racer. He last competed for the UCI ProTour team Euskaltel–Euskadi.

In 2004, Azanza won his first and still only races, when he finished first in the overall rankings of the Vuelta a Córdoba. He also won Part A of the third stage in the Bidasoa Itzulia in that same year. In 2007 he made his Tour de France debut.

== Career achievements ==
=== Major results ===
2004
1st Overall Vuelta a Cordoba
1st Stage 3a Bidasoa Itzulia
2005
9th Overall Vuelta a La Rioja
2006
6th Trofeo Magaluf-Palmanova

=== Grand Tour general classification results timeline ===
Grand Tour	2007	2008	2009	2010	2011	2012	2013
Giro d'Italia	—	—	—	—	67	—	33
Tour de France	81	—	—	—	—	74	—
Vuelta a España	—	—	—	—	97	—	90

Legend
—	Did not compete
DNF	Did not finish

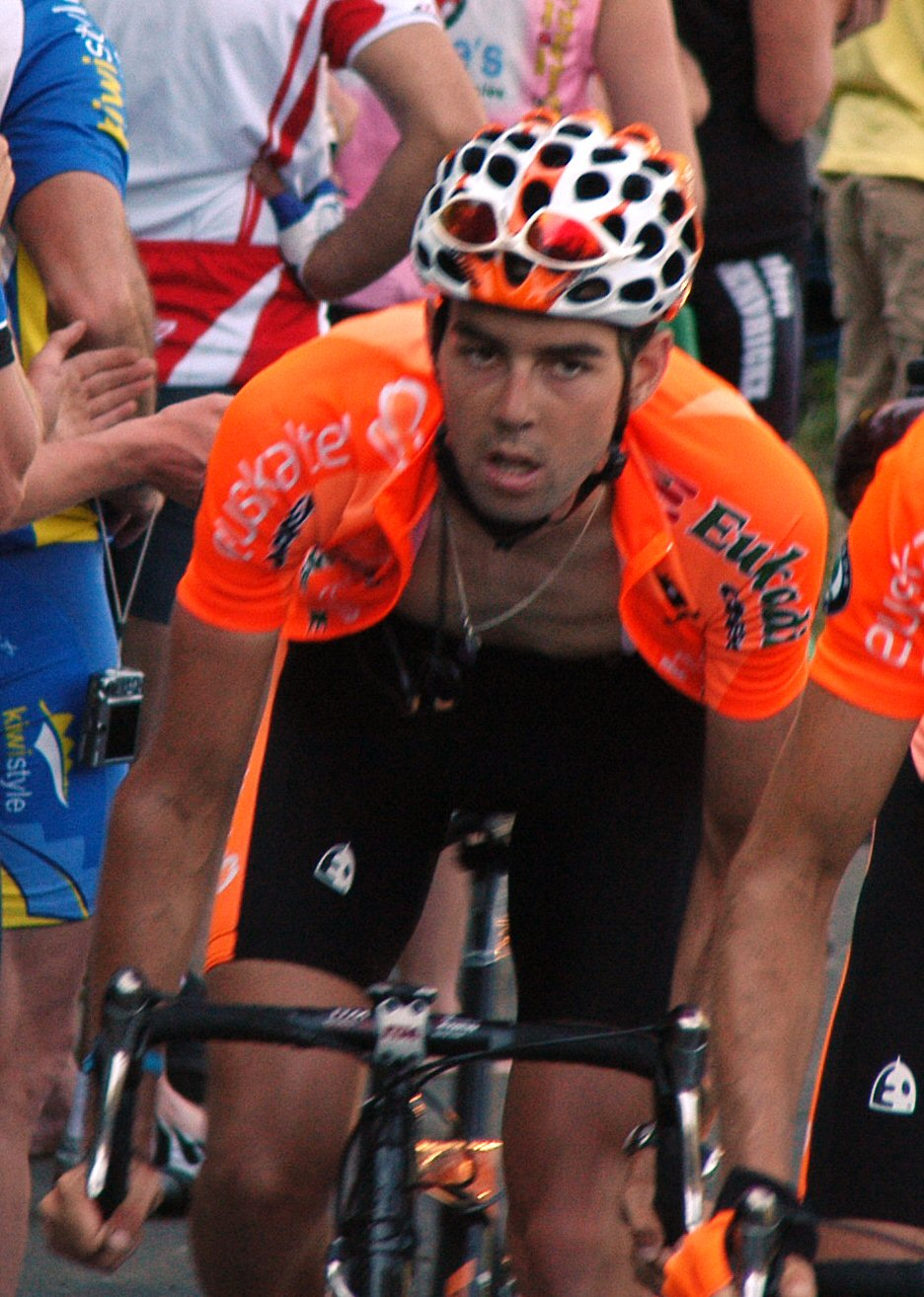
Azanza at the 2007 Tour de France, during the seventh stage of the race.
