= Romain Sicard =

French racing cyclist

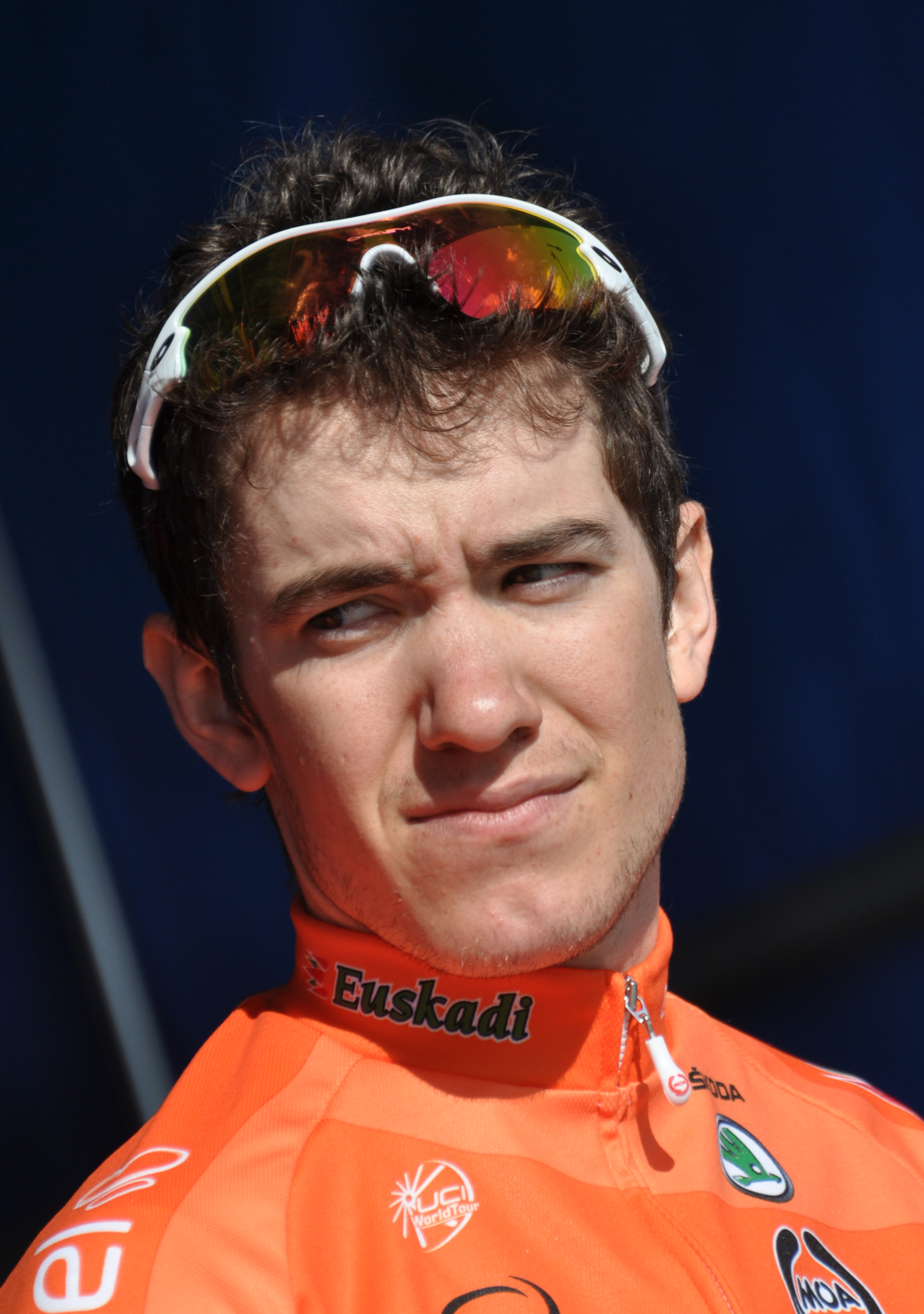
- Sicard in 2012

Personal information
- Full name: Romain Sicard
- Born: 1 January 1988 (age 38) Bayonne, France
- Height: 1.77 m (5 ft 9 1/2 in)
- Weight: 64.5 kg (142 lb; 10 st 2 lb)

Cycling career
- Sport: Cycling
- Current team: Retired
- Discipline: Road
- Role: Rider
- Rider type: Climber; Puncheur

Amateur teams
- 2002–2004: VC Tarnos
- 2005–2006: US Colomiers
- 2007–2008: GSC Blagnac

Professional teams
- 2009: Orbea
- 2010–2013: Euskaltel–Euskadi
- 2014–2021: Team Europcar

Romain Sicard (born 1 January 1988) is a French former professional racing cyclist, who rode professionally between 2009 and 2021 for the Orbea, Euskaltel–Euskadi and Total Direct Énergie teams.

== Career ==
Born in Bayonne, Sicard won the Tour de l'Avenir and the under 23 World Road Race Championships in 2009, the only man to win both in the same season. In 2010, he joined the Basque UCI ProTour team Euskaltel–Euskadi as the second ever French national after Thierry Elissalde.

Sicard joined Team Europcar for the 2014 season, after his previous team – Euskaltel–Euskadi – folded at the end of the 2013 season.

He announced his retirement in April 2021 due to the diagnosis of a cardiac anomaly.

== Major results ==
2008
9th Overall Ronde de l'Isard
2009
1st Road race, UCI Under-23 Road World UChampionships
1st Overall Tour de l'Avenir

1st Stage 8 (ITT)

1st Subida al Naranco
1st Stage 2 Ronde de l'Isard
3rd Overall Tour du Haut-Anjou
4th Overall Cinturó de l'Empordà
9th Overall Tour du Loir-et-Cher
10th Vuelta a La Rioja
2010
9th Vuelta a La Rioja
10th Overall Bayern–Rundfahrt
2014
7th Overall Tour de l'Ain
2015
5th Time trial, National Road Championships
6th Overall Vuelta a Castilla y León
2016
8th Overall Critérium International
2017
2nd Overall Tour du Gévaudan Languedoc-Roussillon
5th Tour du Doubs
7th Overall Tour du Limousin
8th Overall Settimana Internazionale di Coppi e Bartali
2018
8th Tour du Gévaudan Occitanie
10th Classic de l'Ardèche

=== Grand Tour general classification results timeline ===
Grand Tour	2012	2013	2014	2015	2016	2017	2018	2019	2020
Giro d'Italia	—	—	51	—	—	—	—	—	—
Tour de France	—	122	—	33	81	66	73	80	31
Vuelta a España	44	—	13	15	55	—	—	—	45

Legend
—	Did not compete
DNF	Did not finish
