= Pablo Urtasun =

Spanish cyclist

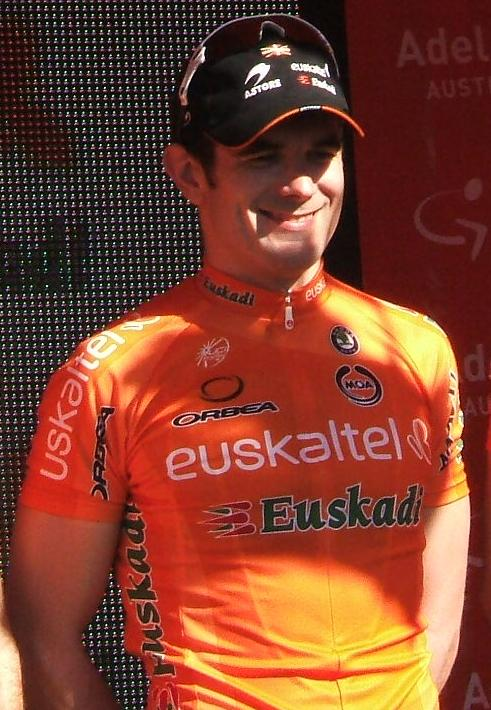
- Urtasun at the 2009 Tour Down Under.

Personal information
- Full name: Pablo Urtasun Pérez
- Born: 29 March 1980 (age 46) Urdiain, Spain
- Height: 1.77 m (5 ft 10 in)
- Weight: 69 kg (152 lb; 10.9 st)

Cycling career
- Sport: Cycling
- Current team: Equipo Kern Pharma
- Discipline: Road
- Role: Rider (retired); Directeur sportif
- Rider type: Sprinter

Amateur team
- 2003: Team CSC (stagiaire)

Professional teams
- 2005–2006: Kaiku
- 2007–2008: Liberty Seguros Continental
- 2009–2013: Euskaltel–Euskadi
- 2014: PinoRoad
- 2015: Team UKYO
- 2016: Funvic Soul Cycles–Carrefour

Managerial team
- 2020–: Equipo Kern Pharma

Pablo Urtasun Pérez (born 29 March 1980) is a Spanish former professional road bicycle racer, who rode professionally between 2005 and 2016. He now works as a directeur sportif for UCI Continental team Equipo Kern Pharma.

== Career ==
Urtasun was born in Urdiain, Navarre. In 2013, Urtasun earned his team's first victory of the season by outsprinting his rivals in the first stage of the Vuelta a Castilla y León.

Urtasun joined the PinoRoad squad for the 2014 season, after his previous team – Euskaltel–Euskadi – folded at the end of the 2013 season. For the 2015 season, he joined the Japanese UCI Continental team Team UKYO.

After retiring, Urtasun became a directeur sportif for UCI Continental team Equipo Kern Pharma in 2020, during their first season of competition.

== Major results ==
2004
1st Stage 3 Vuelta a Navarra
2006
1st Stage 1 Volta ao Alentejo
2nd Overall Rheinland-Pfalz Rundfahrt
2007
1st Stage 3 Vuelta a La Rioja
2008
1st Stage 5 Vuelta a Asturias
5th Gran Premio de Llodio
2009
3rd Prueba Villafranca de Ordizia
2010
1st Stage 1 Vuelta a Asturias
2012
1st Stage 7 Tour of Britain
2nd Vuelta a La Rioja
3rd Overall Vuelta a Castilla y León
2013
2nd Klasika Primavera
4th Overall Vuelta a Castilla y León

1st Stage 1

Combativity award Stage 6 Vuelta a España

=== Grand Tour general classification results timeline ===
| Grand Tour | 2010 | 2011 | 2012 | 2013 |
|---|---|---|---|---|
| Giro d'Italia | — | — | — | DNF |
| Tour de France | — | 148 | 134 | — |
| Vuelta a España | 100 | — | — | 122 |

Legend
| — | Did not compete |
| DNF | Did not finish |
