= Gorka Verdugo =

Spanish cyclist

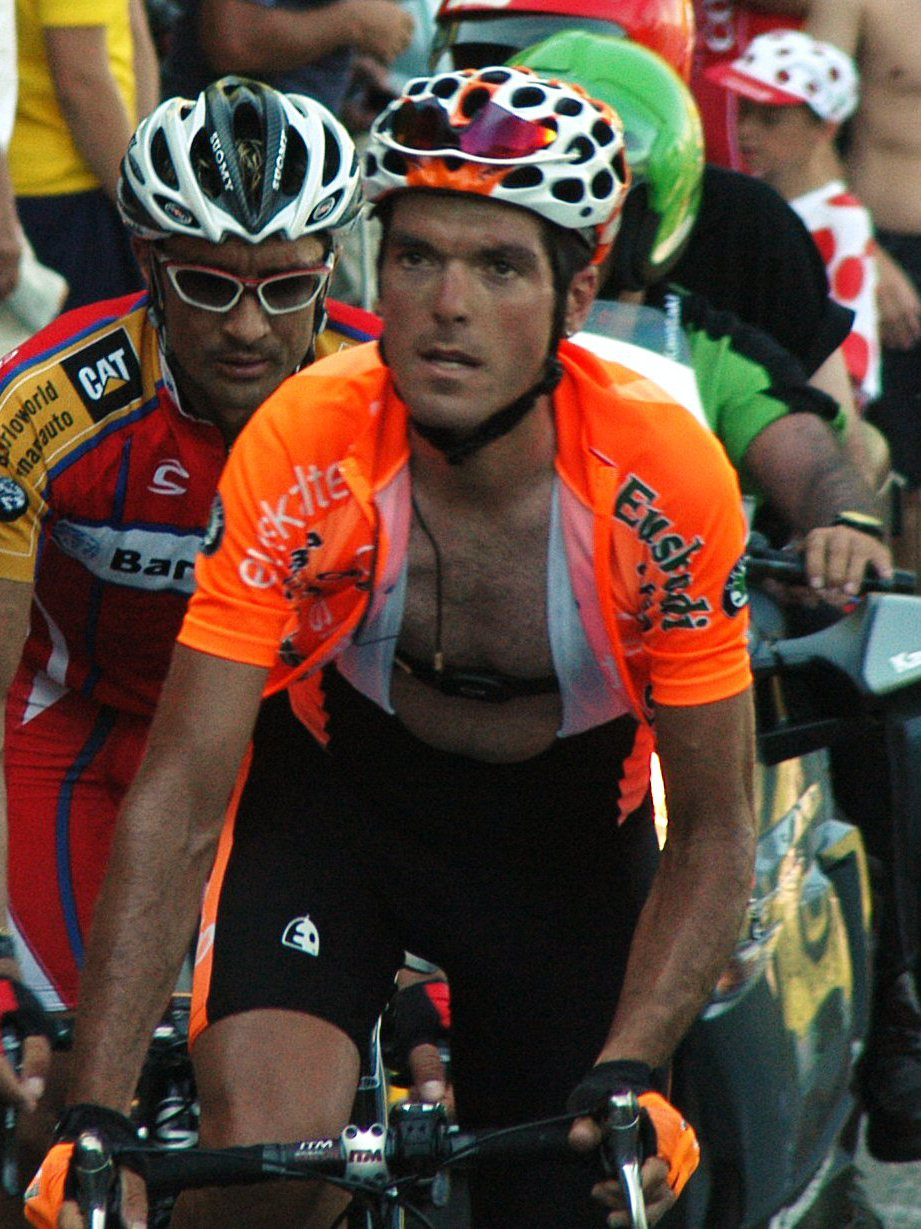
- Verdugo at the 2007 Tour de France

Personal information
- Full name: Gorka Verdugo Markotegui
- Born: 4 November 1978 (age 47) Etxarri-Aranatz, Spain
- Height: 1.81 m (5 ft 11 in)
- Weight: 69 kg (152 lb)

Cycling career
- Sport: Cycling
- Discipline: Road
- Role: Rider
- Rider type: Climber

Professional team
- 2004–2013: Euskaltel–Euskadi

Gorka Verdugo Markotegui (born 4 November 1978) is a Spanish former professional road bicycle racer, who last rode for UCI ProTour team Euskaltel–Euskadi.

Born in Etxarri-Aranatz, Navarre, Verdugo did not win any professional races, but made his Giro d'Italia debut in 2005 (86th) and his Tour de France debut in 2006 (75th). His highest placing in the Tour de France was in 2011 (25th), however despite completing it an impressive 6 times he has never had a top-ten finish in any stage of the race. Considered a reliable team rider, his is best individual tour performance was on stage 16 in the 2007 Tour de France where in a breakaway he gained enough points in the mountains classification to finish 11th overall in Paris. He finished 11th overall in the 2012 Vuelta a Espana, marking his best grand tour finish yet.

== Career achievements ==
=== Major results ===
2006
10th Overall Clásica Internacional de Alcobendas
2008
5th Overall Volta a la Comunitat Valenciana
7th Overall Paris–Nice
10th Overall Volta a Catalunya
10th Subida a Urkiola
2009
8th Klasika Primavera
2012
3rd Gran Piemonte
2013
7th Prueba Villafranca de Ordizia

=== Grand Tour general classification results timeline ===
Grand Tour	2005	2006	2007	2008	2009	2010	2011	2012	2013
Giro d'Italia	68	—	—	—	—	—	—	—	64
Tour de France	—	74	47	70	60	35	24	DNF	—
Vuelta a España	—	—	—	—	—	83	36	11	63

Legend
—	Did not compete
DNF	Did not finish
