= Euskadi (Continental cycling team) =

Spanish cycling team

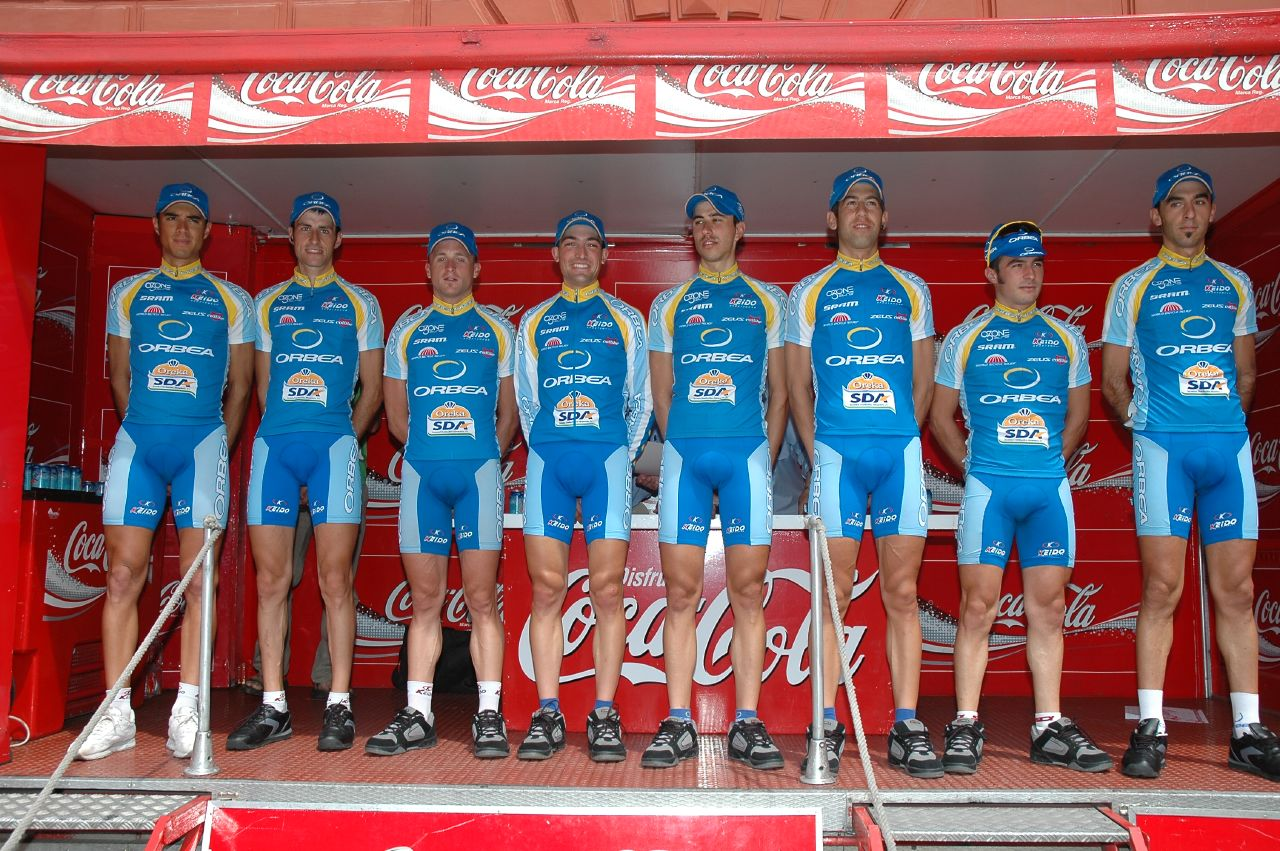

Team information
- UCI code: ORB
- Registered: Spain
- Founded: 2005
- Discipline: Road
- Status: UCI Continental Tour

Key personnel
- General manager: Álvaro González de Galdeano

Team name history
- 2005–2006 2007–2008 2009–2011 2012 2013–2014: Orbea; Orbea-Oreka SDA; Orbea; Orbea Continental; Euskadi

Euskadi (UCI team code: ORB) was a Spanish cycling team based in the Basque Country that existed from 2005 to 2014. It was one of the European teams in UCI Continental Tour.

The team functioned as the development team of the original Euskaltel–Euskadi and the unofficial "national" squad of the Basque region. Orbea's team manager, Álvaro González de Galdeano, is the older brother of Igor González de Galdeano, the last manager of Euskaltel. The team focused primarily on young riders, of whom the most successful usually made the transfer to Euskaltel–Euskadi.

== Sponsorship ==
The main sponsor Orbea is a bicycle manufacturer based in Mallabia which has sponsored numerous cycling teams.

== Major wins ==
2005
Stage 6 Tour de l'Avenir, Jesús Del Nero
2006
Stage 1 Vuelta a la Comunidad de Madrid, Josu Agirre
Stage 3 Euskal Bizikleta, Aaron Villegas
Stage 7 Circuito Montañés, Vidal Celis
2007
Stage 2 Circuito Montañés, Xabat Otxotorena
Stage 7 Circuito Montañés, Ivan Melero
2008
Stage 1a Vuelta a Navarra, Team Time Trial
2009
Subida al Naranco, Romain Sicard
Stage 3 Tour du Haut Anjou, Jonathan Castroviejo
Prologue Ronde de l'Isard, Jonathan Castroviejo
Stage 2 Ronde de l'Isard, Romain Sicard
2010
2011
Stage 1 GP Costa Azul, Jon Aberasturi
Stage 4 Vuelta a Asturias, Victor Cabedo
Stage 2 Cinturo de l'Emporda, Ricardo García
2013
Stage 2 Ronde de l'Isard, Carlos Barbero
Overall Tour de Gironde, Jon Larrinaga

Stage 2, Jon Larrinaga

Stage 2 Troféu Joaquim Agostinho, Jon Larrinaga
2014
Overall Volta ao Alentejo, Carlos Barbero
Stage 1 Tour de Gironde, Team time trial
Circuito de Getxo, Carlos Barbero

== See also ==
- List of cycling teams in Spain
