= 2011 Tour de France, Stage 1 to Stage 11 =

These are the profiles for the individual stages in the 2011 Tour de France, with Stage 1 on 2 July, and Stage 11 on 13 July. In February 2012 following doping allegations a decision by the Court of Arbitration for Sport stripped of all results of Alberto Contador obtained in and later than the 2010 Tour de France, which led him to being stripped of that title, as well as his results in the 2011 Tour de France. His results have thus been removed here, with cyclists behind him moving up one spot.

Legend (Note: Jerseys appearing in the table on the left of the page indicate those worn by the cyclist during the particular stage, while those appearing in the table on the right of the page indicate those awarded to the cyclist after the stage.)
A yellow jersey	Denotes the leader of the general classification	A green jersey	Denotes the leader of the points classification
A polka-dot jersey	Denotes the leader of the mountains classification	A white jersey	Denotes the leader of the young rider classification
A jersey with a black rider number on a yellow background	Denotes the leader of the team classification (Note: The bibs are designated to all remaining riders within the leading team.)	A jersey with a white rider number on a red background	Denotes the rider designated as the day's most combative
	s.t. indicates that the rider crossed the finish line in the same group as the one receiving the time above him, and was therefore credited with the same finishing time.		

== Stage 1 ==
2 July 2011 — Passage du Gois to Mont des Alouettes, 191.5 km (119 mi)

The Tour started with a road stage rather than the traditional prologue time trial, and with an uphill finish. The day started with a non-racing parade over the tidal Passage du Gois. When underway, the riders initially followed the coast, where the wind could have had an impact, before heading inland to Les Herbiers and the finish on the Mont des Alouettes.

The first breakaway of the Tour was formed by three riders: Lieuwe Westra of Vacansoleil–DCM, Perrig Quéméneur of Team Europcar and Jérémy Roy of FDJ. They attacked from the very beginning of the race and their maximum advantage was over six minutes. The top places in the intermediate sprint after 87 km (54 mi) were won by the breakaway members and the new points distribution saw green jersey contenders competing for the rest of points. Tyler Farrar took fourth place ahead of André Greipel. About nine kilometres from the end, Maxim Iglinsky collided with a spectator, and the resulting crash held up the majority of the field, including Alberto Contador and Samuel Sánchez. This group were chasing the lead group of 78 riders, until within the last three kilometers, they were delayed by another crash that had split the lead group approximately in half. On the uphill finish, an attack by Fabian Cancellara was successfully countered by Philippe Gilbert, who was favourite for the stage, and who finished three seconds clear of Cadel Evans, who finished a similar margin clear of the chasing group. Due to rules that protect riders against time lost due to accidents in the latter stages of a race, about 40 riders who had been in the same group as Gilbert and others at 3 km (2 mi) to go, but who were delayed by a later crash, were awarded the same time as those who finished just behind Gilbert and Evans, but those who caught up with them, having been delayed in the Iglinsky incident, lost at least 1'20".

Stage 1 result and general classification after stage 1

Rank	Rider	Team	Time
1	Philippe Gilbert (BEL)	Omega Pharma–Lotto	4h 41' 31"
2	Cadel Evans (AUS)	BMC Racing Team	+ 3"
3	Thor Hushovd (NOR)	Garmin–Cervélo	+ 6"
4	José Joaquín Rojas (ESP)	Movistar Team	+ 6"
5	Jurgen Van den Broeck (BEL)	Omega Pharma–Lotto	+ 6"
6	Geraint Thomas (GBR)	Team Sky	+ 6"
7	Andreas Klöden (GER)	Team RadioShack	+ 6"
8	Rein Taaramäe (EST)	Cofidis	+ 6"
9	Chris Horner (USA)	Team RadioShack	+ 6"
10	Tony Martin (GER)	HTC–Highroad	+ 6"

== Stage 2 ==
3 July 2011 — Les Essarts, 23 km (14 mi) team time trial (TTT)

The team time trial was relatively short at 23 km (14 mi) and mostly flat, so large time gaps were not expected. Garmin–Cervélo, who saw all their GC contenders lose nearly two minutes on stage 1, won the stage to place their world champion Thor Hushovd in the overall lead, while Cadel Evans, who had a three-second advantage over Hushovd going into the stage, was almost able to take the yellow jersey, as his BMC Racing Team team took just four seconds longer than Garmin–Cervélo to come second, a fraction of a second faster than Team Sky.

Stage 2 result

Rank	Team	Time
1	Garmin–Cervélo	24' 48"
2	BMC Racing Team	+ 4"
3	Team Sky	+ 4"
4	Leopard Trek	+ 4"
5	HTC–Highroad	+ 5"
6	Team RadioShack	+ 10"
7	Rabobank	+ 12"
8	Saxo Bank–SunGard	+ 28"
9	Astana	+ 32"
10	Omega Pharma–Lotto	+ 39"

General classification after stage 2

Rank	Rider	Team	Time
1	Thor Hushovd (NOR)	Garmin–Cervélo	5h 06' 25"
2	David Millar (GBR)	Garmin–Cervélo	+ 0"
3	Cadel Evans (AUS)	BMC Racing Team	+ 1"
4	Geraint Thomas (GBR)	Team Sky	+ 4"
5	Linus Gerdemann (GER)	Leopard Trek	+ 4"
6	Fränk Schleck (LUX)	Leopard Trek	+ 4"
7	Fabian Cancellara (SUI)	Leopard Trek	+ 4"
8	Edvald Boasson Hagen (NOR)	Team Sky	+ 4"
9	Manuel Quinziato (ITA)	BMC Racing Team	+ 4"
10	Andy Schleck (LUX)	Leopard Trek	+ 4"

== Stage 3 ==
4 July 2011 — Olonne-sur-Mer to Redon, 198 km (123 mi)

The break of the day, consisting of Mickaël Delage (FDJ), José Iván Gutiérrez (Movistar Team), Rubén Pérez (Euskaltel–Euskadi), Maxime Bouet (Ag2r–La Mondiale) and Niki Terpstra (Quick-Step) went clear within the opening kilometre of racing. Their lead reached a maximum of eight minutes after 80 km (50 mi). The members of the breakaway took the intermediate sprint, but the sprint for remaining points caused controversy, as Mark Cavendish, who won the sprint, later had the points he won at this stage removed, as did Thor Hushovd. Delage and Gutiérrez were the last pair of the break to remain clear of the peloton, but were caught with 9 km (6 mi) remaining. The stage was won by Hushovd's Garmin–Cervélo teammate Tyler Farrar, who took his first individual Tour stage win. Farrar formed a 'W' sign with his fingers on the line in homage to his friend Wouter Weylandt who died in a crash on the Giro d'Italia in May. Movistar Team rider José Joaquín Rojas, third on the stage, assumed the lead of the points classification from Philippe Gilbert.

Stage 3 result

Rank	Rider	Team	Time
1	Tyler Farrar (USA)	Garmin–Cervélo	4h 40' 21"
2	Romain Feillu (FRA)	Vacansoleil–DCM	s.t.
3	José Joaquín Rojas (ESP)	Movistar Team	s.t.
4	Sébastien Hinault (FRA)	Ag2r–La Mondiale	s.t.
5	Mark Cavendish (GBR)	HTC–Highroad	s.t.
6	Thor Hushovd (NOR)	Garmin–Cervélo	s.t.
7	Julian Dean (NZL)	Garmin–Cervélo	s.t.
8	Borut Božič (SLO)	Vacansoleil–DCM	s.t.
9	André Greipel (GER)	Omega Pharma–Lotto	s.t.
10	Jimmy Engoulvent (FRA)	Saur–Sojasun	s.t.

General classification after stage 3

Rank	Rider	Team	Time
1	Thor Hushovd (NOR)	Garmin–Cervélo	9h 46' 46"
2	David Millar (GBR)	Garmin–Cervélo	+ 0"
3	Cadel Evans (AUS)	BMC Racing Team	+ 1"
4	Geraint Thomas (GBR)	Team Sky	+ 4"
5	Linus Gerdemann (GER)	Leopard Trek	+ 4"
6	Edvald Boasson Hagen (NOR)	Team Sky	+ 4"
7	Fränk Schleck (LUX)	Leopard Trek	+ 4"
8	Andy Schleck (LUX)	Leopard Trek	+ 4"
9	Jakob Fuglsang (DEN)	Leopard Trek	+ 4"
10	Bradley Wiggins (GBR)	Team Sky	+ 4"

== Stage 4 ==
5 July 2011 — Lorient to Mûr-de-Bretagne, 172.5 km (107 mi)

This was an undulating course, with a steep hill shortly before the finish. A five-man breakaway group escaped after 9 km (6 mi), consisting of Jérémy Roy (FDJ), Blel Kadri (Ag2r–La Mondiale), Imanol Erviti (Movistar Team), Johnny Hoogerland (Vacansoleil–DCM) and Gorka Izagirre (Euskaltel–Euskadi), and remained on their own until the foot of the Mûr-de-Bretagne. Defending champion Alberto Contador was the first to attack in the closing stages, causing several splits in the field, including a group of ten at the front of the race. As Contador's initial attack failed, Jurgen Van den Broeck tried to break clear, but was caught up by the front group, and Cadel Evans, third in the overall standings at the beginning of the day, held off a final sprint from Contador to win the stage, but the presence of Thor Hushovd in the lead group meant that Hushovd kept the overall lead, while Evans took the lead in the mountains classification.

Stage 4 result

Rank	Rider	Team	Time
1	Cadel Evans (AUS)	BMC Racing Team	4h 11' 39"
2	Alexander Vinokourov (KAZ)	Astana	s.t.
3	Rigoberto Urán (COL)	Team Sky	s.t.
4	Philippe Gilbert (BEL)	Omega Pharma–Lotto	s.t.
5	Thor Hushovd (NOR)	Garmin–Cervélo	s.t.
6	Fränk Schleck (LUX)	Leopard Trek	s.t.
7	Samuel Sánchez (ESP)	Euskaltel–Euskadi	s.t.
8	Jurgen Van den Broeck (BEL)	Omega Pharma–Lotto	s.t.
9	Andreas Klöden (GER)	Team RadioShack	s.t.
10	Bradley Wiggins (GBR)	Team Sky	+ 6"

General classification after stage 4

Rank	Rider	Team	Time
1	Thor Hushovd (NOR)	Garmin–Cervélo	13h 58' 25"
2	Cadel Evans (AUS)	BMC Racing Team	+ 1"
3	Fränk Schleck (LUX)	Leopard Trek	+ 4"
4	David Millar (GBR)	Garmin–Cervélo	+ 8"
5	Andreas Klöden (GER)	Team RadioShack	+ 10"
6	Bradley Wiggins (GBR)	Team Sky	+ 10"
7	Geraint Thomas (GBR)	Team Sky	+ 12"
8	Edvald Boasson Hagen (NOR)	Team Sky	+ 12"
9	Andy Schleck (LUX)	Leopard Trek	+ 12"
10	Jakob Fuglsang (DEN)	Leopard Trek	+ 12"

== Stage 5 ==
6 July 2011 — Carhaix to Cap Fréhel, 164.5 km (102 mi)

Many riders tried to get into the breakaway in this stage, but the final breakaway was formed of 4 riders: José Iván Gutiérrez (Movistar Team), Tristan Valentin (Cofidis), Sébastien Turgot (Team Europcar), and Anthony Delaplace (Saur–Sojasun). They had a maximum advantage of 5 minutes. The intermediate sprint was won by the breakaway riders, while in the peloton Borut Božič took the highest remaining points haul. José Joaquín Rojas and Tom Boonen were penalised for irregular sprinting at this point, a penalty that cost Rojas his lead in the green jersey competition. After the intermediate sprint, Garmin–Cervélo set a very high pace and there were many crashes in the peloton, one of which involved Janez Brajkovič, who had to abandon due to a broken collarbone and concussion. Another crash involved Nicki Sørensen who fall off when his bike was clipped by a photo motorcycle and it was dragged along by it for 200m. Alberto Contador, Robert Gesink, Tom Boonen, Sylvain Chavanel and Iván Velasco, who sustained a broken collarbone, were among other riders who crashed on this stage. The breakaway was caught with 45 km (28 mi) to go, but Thomas Voeckler (Team Europcar) and Jérémy Roy (FDJ) attacked with 32 km (20 mi) to go, creating a maximum gap of one minute, and the race was in the last 2 km (1 mi) before Voeckler was caught. A late attack by Edvald Boasson Hagen disrupted the lead out lines for the main sprinters, but Mark Cavendish nevertheless took the victory ahead of Philippe Gilbert in the last 50 metres. There were no changes among the leading riders and contenders for the General Classification, but Gilbert assumed the lead in the sprinters' competition, although this was confirmed only after Rojas had been presented with the leader's jersey on the podium.

Stage 5 result

Rank	Rider	Team	Time
1	Mark Cavendish (GBR)	HTC–Highroad	3h 38' 32"
2	Philippe Gilbert (BEL)	Omega Pharma–Lotto	s.t.
3	José Joaquín Rojas (ESP)	Movistar Team	s.t.
4	Tony Gallopin (FRA)	Cofidis	s.t.
5	Geraint Thomas (GBR)	Team Sky	s.t.
6	André Greipel (GER)	Omega Pharma–Lotto	s.t.
7	Sébastien Hinault (FRA)	Ag2r–La Mondiale	s.t.
8	William Bonnet (FRA)	FDJ	s.t.
9	Daniel Oss (ITA)	Liquigas–Cannondale	s.t.
10	Thor Hushovd (NOR)	Garmin–Cervélo	s.t.

General classification after stage 5

Rank	Rider	Team	Time
1	Thor Hushovd (NOR)	Garmin–Cervélo	17h 36' 57"
2	Cadel Evans (AUS)	BMC Racing Team	+ 1"
3	Fränk Schleck (LUX)	Leopard Trek	+ 4"
4	David Millar (GBR)	Garmin–Cervélo	+ 8"
5	Andreas Klöden (GER)	Team RadioShack	+ 10"
6	Bradley Wiggins (GBR)	Team Sky	+ 10"
7	Geraint Thomas (GBR)	Team Sky	+ 12"
8	Edvald Boasson Hagen (NOR)	Team Sky	+ 12"
9	Jakob Fuglsang (DEN)	Leopard Trek	+ 12"
10	Andy Schleck (LUX)	Leopard Trek	+ 12"

== Stage 6 ==
7 July 2011 — Dinan to Lisieux, 226.5 km (141 mi)

This was another undulating stage with a hill in the last few kilometres, expected to suit classics specialists. Lieuwe Westra (Vacansoleil–DCM) initiated the main break of the day, eventually joined by his teammate Johnny Hoogerland, Anthony Roux (FDJ), Leonardo Duque (Cofidis) and Adriano Malori (Lampre–ISD). Their lead reached 12 minutes, and Hoogerland added to the point in the mountains classification that he already had on the first two categorised climbs of the day, and thus ensured that he would take over the polka-dot jersey, and he, along with Roux and Duque, had ceased trying to stay clear when there were still some 60 km remaining, but Westra and Malori persisted, with Malori only caught with less than three km remaining. A late attack by Jelle Vanendert (Omega Pharma–Lotto) and Thomas Voeckler (Team Europcar) was caught with a kilometre remaining, and the sprint was eventually won by Edvald Boasson Hagen of (Team Sky), with fellow Norwegian Thor Hushovd finishing third to retain the yellow jersey. Although there were several heavy rain showers, there were fewer falls than in the previous stage, although GC contender Levi Leipheimer (Team RadioShack) fell and lost more than a minute.

Stage 6 result

Rank	Rider	Team	Time
1	Edvald Boasson Hagen (NOR)	Team Sky	5h 13' 37"
2	Matthew Goss (AUS)	HTC–Highroad	s.t.
3	Thor Hushovd (NOR)	Garmin–Cervélo	s.t.
4	Romain Feillu (FRA)	Vacansoleil–DCM	s.t.
5	José Joaquín Rojas (ESP)	Movistar Team	s.t.
6	Arthur Vichot (FRA)	FDJ	s.t.
7	Philippe Gilbert (BEL)	Omega Pharma–Lotto	s.t.
8	Gerald Ciolek (GER)	Quick-Step	s.t.
9	Marco Marcato (ITA)	Vacansoleil–DCM	s.t.
10	Arnold Jeannesson (FRA)	FDJ	s.t.

General classification after stage 6

Rank	Rider	Team	Time
1	Thor Hushovd (NOR)	Garmin–Cervélo	22h 50' 34"
2	Cadel Evans (AUS)	BMC Racing Team	+ 1"
3	Fränk Schleck (LUX)	Leopard Trek	+ 4"
4	David Millar (GBR)	Garmin–Cervélo	+ 8"
5	Andreas Klöden (GER)	Team RadioShack	+ 10"
6	Bradley Wiggins (GBR)	Team Sky	+ 10"
7	Geraint Thomas (GBR)	Team Sky	+ 12"
8	Edvald Boasson Hagen (NOR)	Team Sky	+ 12"
9	Jakob Fuglsang (DEN)	Leopard Trek	+ 12"
10	Andy Schleck (LUX)	Leopard Trek	+ 12"

== Stage 7 ==
8 July 2011 — Le Mans to Châteauroux, 218 km (135 mi)

This stage had no climbing points available, and was considered to be very much a chance for the sprint specialists to contest the stage win. The break formed very early in the stage, with two riders from FDJ, Gianni Meersman and Mickaël Delage along with Yannick Talabardon (Saur–Sojasun) and Pablo Urtasun (Euskaltel–Euskadi). A crash with 40 km (25 mi) remaining caused injuries to Bradley Wiggins of Team Sky and Chris Horner of Team RadioShack that caused them to retire from the race, while other GC contenders to lose time included Levi Leipheimer, Ryder Hesjedal, Roman Kreuziger, Rigoberto Urán and Bauke Mollema. The sprint train of HTC–Highroad dominated the closing stages of the races, allowing Mark Cavendish to take the stage win. Overall leader Thor Hushovd finished in seventh place to retain that position.

Stage 7 result

Rank	Rider	Team	Time
1	Mark Cavendish (GBR)	HTC–Highroad	5h 38' 53"
2	Alessandro Petacchi (ITA)	Lampre–ISD	s.t.
3	André Greipel (GER)	Omega Pharma–Lotto	s.t.
4	Romain Feillu (FRA)	Vacansoleil–DCM	s.t.
5	William Bonnet (FRA)	FDJ	s.t.
6	Denis Galimzyanov (RUS)	Team Katusha	s.t.
7	Thor Hushovd (NOR)	Garmin–Cervélo	s.t.
8	Sébastien Turgot (FRA)	Team Europcar	s.t.
9	José Joaquín Rojas (ESP)	Movistar Team	s.t.
10	Sébastien Hinault (FRA)	Ag2r–La Mondiale	s.t.

General classification after stage 7

Rank	Rider	Team	Time
1	Thor Hushovd (NOR)	Garmin–Cervélo	28h 29' 27"
2	Cadel Evans (AUS)	BMC Racing Team	+ 1"
3	Fränk Schleck (LUX)	Leopard Trek	+ 4"
4	David Millar (GBR)	Garmin–Cervélo	+ 8"
5	Andreas Klöden (GER)	Team RadioShack	+ 10"
6	Jakob Fuglsang (DEN)	Leopard Trek	+ 12"
7	Andy Schleck (LUX)	Leopard Trek	+ 12"
8	Tony Martin (GER)	HTC–Highroad	+ 13"
9	Peter Velits (SVK)	HTC–Highroad	+ 13"
10	Robert Gesink (NED)	Rabobank	+ 20"

== Stage 8 ==
9 July 2011 — Aigurande to Super Besse, 189 km (117 mi)

This stage had the first category two climb of the race, and brought the race into the higher climbs of the Massif Central. By the ascent of the day's main climb, in the final 25 km, four riders from the original nine-man break remained clear: Rui Costa (Movistar Team), Christophe Riblon (Ag2r–La Mondiale), Tejay van Garderen (HTC–Highroad) and Cyril Gautier (Team Europcar). On that climb, several riders attempted to attack from the group, of whom Juan Antonio Flecha (Team Sky) and Alexander Vinokourov (Astana) attained a considerable margin over the peloton as they pursued the leader. Vinokourov started the stage only 32 seconds behind overall leader Thor Hushovd, and this was thought to be a bid to take the yellow jersey. The final climb to the Super Besse ski station saw several attempts at breaks among the leaders, and eventually Costa was able to open a gap to the rest of the breakaway group. Vinokourov overhauled the rest of the escapees, but he was caught within the last kilometre, while Costa won the stage. Philippe Gilbert broke clear of the peloton to secure second place, and the lead in the points competition, while Hushovd, contrary to expectations, finished in the first group to retain his overall lead. Van Garderen, by virtue of having been the first rider over the category two Col de la Croix Saint-Robert, assumed the lead in the climbers' category.

Stage 8 result

Rank	Rider	Team	Time
1	Rui Costa (POR)	Movistar Team	4h 36' 46"
2	Philippe Gilbert (BEL)	Omega Pharma–Lotto	+ 12"
3	Cadel Evans (AUS)	BMC Racing Team	+ 15"
4	Samuel Sánchez (ESP)	Euskaltel–Euskadi	+ 15"
5	Peter Velits (SVK)	HTC–Highroad	+ 15"
6	Dries Devenyns (BEL)	Quick-Step	+ 15"
7	Damiano Cunego (ITA)	Lampre–ISD	+ 15"
8	Andy Schleck (LUX)	Leopard Trek	+ 15"
9	Fränk Schleck (LUX)	Leopard Trek	+ 15"
10	Rigoberto Urán (COL)	Team Sky	+ 15"

General classification after stage 8

Rank	Rider	Team	Time
1	Thor Hushovd (NOR)	Garmin–Cervélo	33h 06' 28"
2	Cadel Evans (AUS)	BMC Racing Team	+ 1"
3	Fränk Schleck (LUX)	Leopard Trek	+ 4"
4	Andreas Klöden (GER)	Team RadioShack	+ 10"
5	Jakob Fuglsang (DEN)	Leopard Trek	+ 12"
6	Andy Schleck (LUX)	Leopard Trek	+ 12"
7	Tony Martin (GER)	HTC–Highroad	+ 13"
8	Peter Velits (SVK)	HTC–Highroad	+ 13"
9	David Millar (GBR)	Garmin–Cervélo	+ 19"
10	Philippe Gilbert (BEL)	Omega Pharma–Lotto	+ 30"

== Stage 9 ==
10 July 2011 — Issoire to Saint-Flour, 208 km (129 mi)

This stage, like the preceding one, had more points available for the king of the mountains competition than all the preceding stages added together. There were no breaks from the peloton until the first climb of the day, which was contested by Thomas Voeckler (Team Europcar) and Johnny Hoogerland (Vacansoleil–DCM), who were joined by Juan Antonio Flecha (Team Sky), Sandy Casar (FDJ), Luis León Sánchez (Rabobank) and Niki Terpstra (Quick-Step). Terpstra was unable to stay with the escapees on higher climbs as the day went on, but the remaining five riders extended their lead. An early fall by Alberto Contador, after a collision with Vladimir Karpets, caused aggravation to an earlier knee injury, but a later fall delayed many riders, and caused the elimination of GC contenders Alexander Vinokourov and Jurgen Van den Broeck, and injury to Andreas Klöden and other riders. The pursuit of the breakaway was delayed to allow riders involved in the crash, or who stopped to help their colleagues, to rejoin the peloton, thus increasing the likelihood that Voeckler, less than a minute and a half behind in the general classification, would take over the race leadership. Within the final 40 km, two of the leading five riders were involved in a dramatic crash after Juan Antonio Flecha was sideswiped by a France Télévisions car during an overtaking manoeuvre, causing fellow breakaway rider, Johnny Hoogerland to crash into a barbed wire fence. His wound required 33 stitches. Although both riders were able to finish the stage and they shared the combative rider award for the day (one of the rare cases when it had been jointly awarded), they were unable to stay ahead of the peloton. The other three riders from the breakaway retained most of their lead, with little urgency among the peloton for reducing their winning margin, and Sánchez sprinted clear to take the stage. Voeckler assumed the overall lead and Hoogerland had gained enough points prior to his crash to regain leadership in the King of the Mountains competition, while Philippe Gilbert was again the first to finish from the main group, extending his lead in the points classification.

Stage 9 result

Rank	Rider	Team	Time
1	Luis León Sánchez (ESP)	Rabobank	5h 27' 09"
2	Thomas Voeckler (FRA)	Team Europcar	+ 5"
3	Sandy Casar (FRA)	FDJ	+ 13"
4	Philippe Gilbert (BEL)	Omega Pharma–Lotto	+ 3' 59"
5	Peter Velits (SVK)	HTC–Highroad	+ 3' 59"
6	Cadel Evans (AUS)	BMC Racing Team	+ 3' 59"
7	Andy Schleck (LUX)	Leopard Trek	+ 3' 59"
8	Tony Martin (GER)	HTC–Highroad	+ 3' 59"
9	Fränk Schleck (LUX)	Leopard Trek	+ 3' 59"
10	Damiano Cunego (ITA)	Lampre–ISD	+ 3' 59"

General classification after stage 9

Rank	Rider	Team	Time
1	Thomas Voeckler (FRA)	Team Europcar	38h 35' 11"
2	Luis León Sánchez (ESP)	Rabobank	+ 1' 49"
3	Cadel Evans (AUS)	BMC Racing Team	+ 2' 26"
4	Fränk Schleck (LUX)	Leopard Trek	+ 2' 29"
5	Andy Schleck (LUX)	Leopard Trek	+ 2' 37"
6	Tony Martin (GER)	HTC–Highroad	+ 2' 38"
7	Peter Velits (SVK)	HTC–Highroad	+ 2' 38"
8	Andreas Klöden (GER)	Team RadioShack	+ 2' 43"
9	Philippe Gilbert (BEL)	Omega Pharma–Lotto	+ 2' 55"
10	Jakob Fuglsang (DEN)	Leopard Trek	+ 3' 08"

== Stage 10 ==
12 July 2011 — Aurillac to Carmaux, 158 km (98 mi)

The stage after the first rest day returned to lower altitudes, and had only third and fourth category climbs. A six-man breakaway group became established after 11 km, consisting of Rémy Di Gregorio (Astana), Arthur Vichot (FDJ), Sébastien Minard (Ag2r–La Mondiale), Julien El Fares (Cofidis), Marco Marcato (Vacansoleil–DCM) and Anthony Delaplace (Saur–Sojasun), but never had more than three minutes advantage, and was finally caught by late breakaways, and eventually most of the field, on the ascent of the final climb, some 15 km from the finish. That late break was started by Philippe Gilbert, leader of the points competition, and overall leader Thomas Voeckler, and also had Tony Gallopin (Cofidis), Dries Devenyns (Quick-Step) and Tony Martin (HTC–Highroad). This break was unsuccessful, but prevented the usual sprinters' trains, and in the final kilometre, Mark Cavendish was following Daniel Oss (Liquigas–Cannondale) prior to his final effort. André Greipel (Omega Pharma–Lotto), who had been following Cavendish, was able to pass him in the final straight to win the stage, while Cavendish and third placed José Joaquín Rojas reduced Gilbert's lead in the points competition on a day that had no effect on the upper reaches of the general classification.

Stage 10 result

Rank	Rider	Team	Time
1	André Greipel (GER)	Omega Pharma–Lotto	3h 31' 21"
2	Mark Cavendish (GBR)	HTC–Highroad	s.t.
3	José Joaquín Rojas (ESP)	Movistar Team	s.t.
4	Thor Hushovd (NOR)	Garmin–Cervélo	s.t.
5	Romain Feillu (FRA)	Vacansoleil–DCM	s.t.
6	Daniel Oss (ITA)	Liquigas–Cannondale	s.t.
7	Sébastien Hinault (FRA)	Ag2r–La Mondiale	s.t.
8	Borut Božič (SLO)	Vacansoleil–DCM	s.t.
9	Geraint Thomas (GBR)	Team Sky	s.t.
10	Samuel Dumoulin (FRA)	Cofidis	s.t.

General classification after stage 10

Rank	Rider	Team	Time
1	Thomas Voeckler (FRA)	Team Europcar	42h 06' 32"
2	Luis León Sánchez (ESP)	Rabobank	+ 1' 49"
3	Cadel Evans (AUS)	BMC Racing Team	+ 2' 26"
4	Fränk Schleck (LUX)	Leopard Trek	+ 2' 29"
5	Andy Schleck (LUX)	Leopard Trek	+ 2' 37"
6	Tony Martin (GER)	HTC–Highroad	+ 2' 38"
7	Peter Velits (SVK)	HTC–Highroad	+ 2' 38"
8	Andreas Klöden (GER)	Team RadioShack	+ 2' 43"
9	Philippe Gilbert (BEL)	Omega Pharma–Lotto	+ 2' 55"
10	Jakob Fuglsang (DEN)	Leopard Trek	+ 3' 08"

== Stage 11 ==
13 July 2011 — Blaye-les-Mines to Lavaur, 167.5 km (104 mi)

On another stage that was expected to suit sprint specialists, the six members of the breakaway group (Rubén Pérez, Lars Boom, Andriy Hrivko, Mickaël Delage, Tristan Valentin and Jimmy Engoulvent were unable to gain an advantage of more than four and a half minutes. Amid heavy rain, the break was not caught until the final 3 km (2 mi) of the race, and Mark Cavendish took the bunch sprint for his third win of the race, and the resultant points, in combination with those he took by being the first non-breakaway rider at the intermediate sprint, allowed him to take the leadership in the green jersey competition. The stage had no impact on the overall placings.

Stage 11 result

Rank	Rider	Team	Time
1	Mark Cavendish (GBR)	HTC–Highroad	3h 46' 07"
2	André Greipel (GER)	Omega Pharma–Lotto	s.t.
3	Tyler Farrar (USA)	Garmin–Cervélo	s.t.
4	Denis Galimzyanov (RUS)	Team Katusha	s.t.
5	Edvald Boasson Hagen (NOR)	Team Sky	s.t.
6	Romain Feillu (FRA)	Vacansoleil–DCM	s.t.
7	José Joaquín Rojas (ESP)	Movistar Team	s.t.
8	Sébastien Turgot (FRA)	Team Europcar	s.t.
9	Francisco Ventoso (ESP)	Movistar Team	s.t.
10	William Bonnet (FRA)	FDJ	s.t.

General classification after stage 11

Rank	Rider	Team	Time
1	Thomas Voeckler (FRA)	Team Europcar	45h 52' 39"
2	Luis León Sánchez (ESP)	Rabobank	+ 1' 49"
3	Cadel Evans (AUS)	BMC Racing Team	+ 2' 26"
4	Fränk Schleck (LUX)	Leopard Trek	+ 2' 29"
5	Andy Schleck (LUX)	Leopard Trek	+ 2' 37"
6	Tony Martin (GER)	HTC–Highroad	+ 2' 38"
7	Peter Velits (SVK)	HTC–Highroad	+ 2' 38"
8	Andreas Klöden (GER)	Team RadioShack	+ 2' 43"
9	Philippe Gilbert (BEL)	Omega Pharma–Lotto	+ 2' 55"
10	Jakob Fuglsang (DEN)	Leopard Trek	+ 3' 08"
