= 2011 Tour de France, Stage 12 to Stage 21 =

These are the profiles and summaries for the individual stages in the 2011 Tour de France, with Stage 12 on 14 July, to Stage 21 on 24 July.

Legend (Note: Jerseys appearing in the table on the left of the page indicate those worn by the cyclist during the particular stage, while those appearing in the table on the right of the page indicate those awarded to the cyclist after the stage.)
A yellow jersey	Denotes the leader of the general classification	A green jersey	Denotes the leader of the points classification
A polka-dot jersey	Denotes the leader of the mountains classification	A white jersey	Denotes the leader of the young rider classification
A jersey with a black rider number on a yellow background	Denotes a rider representing the leaders of the team classification	A jersey with a white rider number on a red background	Denotes the rider designated as the day's most combative
	s.t. indicates that the rider crossed the finish line in the same group as the one receiving the time above him, and was therefore credited with the same finishing time.		

== Stage 12 ==
14 July 2011 — Cugnaux to Luz Ardiden, 211 km (131 mi)

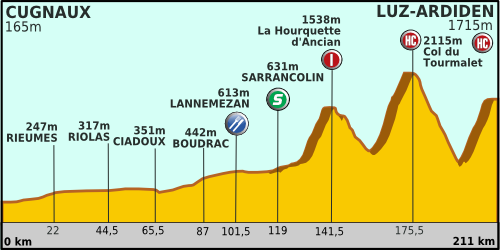

For stage 12, the first stage to enter the high mountains, the route included one first category (La Hourquette d'Ancizan, used by the tour for the first time), and two highest category climbs, and a summit finish. The early breakaway, consisting of Geraint Thomas (Team Sky), Iván Gutiérrez (Movistar Team), Rubén Pérez (Euskaltel–Euskadi), Laurent Mangel (Saur–Sojasun), Blel Kadri (Ag2r–La Mondiale) and Jérémy Roy (FDJ), established a maximum lead of nine minutes and preserved their lead over the first two climbs. On the final climb, an attack by Jelle Vanendert (Omega Pharma–Lotto) and Samuel Sánchez (Euskaltel–Euskadi) was the first to overhaul the breakaway, and they were pursued by a group of the main GC contenders, initially with pacesetting by Sylwester Szmyd which reduced the size of the group, although contrary to expectations, yellow jersey wearer Thomas Voeckler remained with the leaders. With 2.5 km (2 mi) remaining, Fränk Schleck broke clear of the yellow jersey group, but was unable to catch Sánchez and Vanendert, who took the first two places. Within the final kilometre, Alberto Contador lost time to some of his main rivals for the overall competition, Ivan Basso, Cadel Evans and Andy Schleck.

Stage 12 result

Rank	Rider	Team	Time
1	Samuel Sánchez (ESP)	Euskaltel–Euskadi	6h 01' 15"
2	Jelle Vanendert (BEL)	Omega Pharma–Lotto	+ 7"
3	Fränk Schleck (LUX)	Leopard Trek	+ 10"
4	Ivan Basso (ITA)	Liquigas–Cannondale	+ 30"
5	Cadel Evans (AUS)	BMC Racing Team	+ 30"
6	Andy Schleck (LUX)	Leopard Trek	+ 30"
7	Damiano Cunego (ITA)	Lampre–ISD	+ 35"
8	Thomas Voeckler (FRA)	Team Europcar	+ 50"
9	Pierre Rolland (FRA)	Team Europcar	+ 50"
10	Tom Danielson (USA)	Garmin–Cervélo	+ 1' 03"

General classification after stage 12

Rank	Rider	Team	Time
1	Thomas Voeckler (FRA)	Team Europcar	51h 54' 44"
2	Fränk Schleck (LUX)	Leopard Trek	+ 1' 49"
3	Cadel Evans (AUS)	BMC Racing Team	+ 2' 06"
4	Andy Schleck (LUX)	Leopard Trek	+ 2' 17"
5	Ivan Basso (ITA)	Liquigas–Cannondale	+ 3' 16"
6	Damiano Cunego (ITA)	Lampre–ISD	+ 3' 22"
7	Samuel Sánchez (ESP)	Euskaltel–Euskadi	+ 4' 11"
8	Tom Danielson (USA)	Garmin–Cervélo	+ 4' 35"
9	Nicolas Roche (IRL)	Ag2r–La Mondiale	+ 4' 57"
10	Kevin De Weert (BEL)	Quick-Step	+ 5' 07"

== Stage 13 ==
15 July 2011 — Pau to Lourdes, 152.5 km (95 mi)

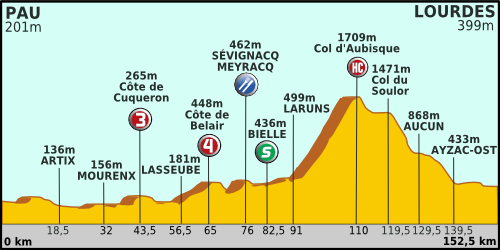

From the original ten man breakaway, three riders, Jérémy Roy (FDJ), Thor Hushovd (Garmin–Cervélo) and David Moncoutié (Cofidis), went clear on the highest category ascent to the Col d'Aubisque, with Roy leading over the top by nearly a minute from Moncoutié, with Hushovd more than a minute further behind. Roy's lead over the peloton at that point was over 8 minutes, and he became leader of the King of the Mountain competition. On the descent, Hushovd caught Moncoutie and the pair pursued Roy until Hushovd, who had worn the yellow jersey for 7 stages earlier in the race, dropped Moncountie inside the last 3 km (2 mi), and passed Roy to win the stage: Moncoutié eventually took second place. Most of the other riders from the early break stayed clear of the peloton, from which Philippe Gilbert (Omega Pharma–Lotto), accompanied by Bauke Mollema (Rabobank), broke away on the descent to regain his place in the top ten overall and gain some points over the other contenders in the points competition. There was little other change in the general classification, with the main peloton coming in some seven and a half minutes behind Hushovd, but Andreas Klöden withdrew earlier in the stage having suffered injuries earlier in the race.

Stage 13 result

Rank	Rider	Team	Time
1	Thor Hushovd (NOR)	Garmin–Cervélo	3h 47' 36"
2	David Moncoutié (FRA)	Cofidis	+ 10"
3	Jérémy Roy (FRA)	FDJ	+ 26"
4	Lars Bak (DEN)	HTC–Highroad	+ 5' 00"
5	Jérôme Pineau (FRA)	Quick-Step	+ 5' 02"
6	Edvald Boasson Hagen (NOR)	Team Sky	+ 5' 03"
7	Vladimir Gusev (RUS)	Team Katusha	+ 5' 08"
8	Alessandro Petacchi (ITA)	Lampre–ISD	+ 5' 16"
9	Maarten Tjallingii (NED)	Rabobank	+ 5' 16"
10	Philippe Gilbert (BEL)	Omega Pharma–Lotto	+ 6' 48"

General classification after stage 13

Rank	Rider	Team	Time
1	Thomas Voeckler (FRA)	Team Europcar	55h 49' 57"
2	Fränk Schleck (LUX)	Leopard Trek	+ 1' 49"
3	Cadel Evans (AUS)	BMC Racing Team	+ 2' 06"
4	Andy Schleck (LUX)	Leopard Trek	+ 2' 17"
5	Ivan Basso (ITA)	Liquigas–Cannondale	+ 3' 16"
6	Damiano Cunego (ITA)	Lampre–ISD	+ 3' 22"
7	Samuel Sánchez (ESP)	Euskaltel–Euskadi	+ 4' 11"
8	Philippe Gilbert (BEL)	Omega Pharma–Lotto	+ 4' 35"
9	Tom Danielson (USA)	Garmin–Cervélo	+ 4' 35"
10	Nicolas Roche (IRL)	Ag2r–La Mondiale	+ 4' 57"

== Stage 14 ==
16 July 2011 — Saint-Gaudens to Plateau de Beille, 168.5 km (105 mi)

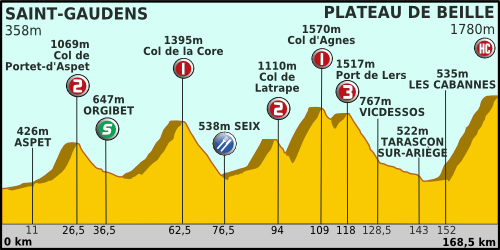

This stage had six categorised climbs. From the original break, which had as many as 24 members but was disrupted by several breaks from among the group, Sandy Casar of FDJ had the virtual lead at one point, but by the beginning of the last climb, to the highest category finish at Plateau de Beille his lead was little over two minutes. On the steeper lower slopes of the climb the chase group was reduced to the eight leading men in the general classification, Voeckler's teammate Pierre Rolland, Rigoberto Urán, who took the white jersey for the leading young rider at the end of the stage, Jean-Christophe Péraud, and Jelle Vanendert. After three abortive attempts by Andy Schleck to split the group, Vanendert broke from the select group of favourites with some 6 km (4 mi) remaining, and was the first to overtake Casar, but only Damiano Cunego was unable to stay with the group. Ivan Basso put the group under further pressure, but Samuel Sánchez was the only one to make any meaningful pursuit of Vanendert, with those two riders reversing the finishing positions from stage 12. Andy Schleck gained two seconds over the group in the final few hundred metres, and Vanendert's stage victory also earned him the leadership of the mountains category.

Stage 14 result

Rank	Rider	Team	Time
1	Jelle Vanendert (BEL)	Omega Pharma–Lotto	5h 13' 25"
2	Samuel Sánchez (ESP)	Euskaltel–Euskadi	+ 21"
3	Andy Schleck (LUX)	Leopard Trek	+ 46"
4	Cadel Evans (AUS)	BMC Racing Team	+ 48"
5	Rigoberto Urán (COL)	Team Sky	+ 48"
6	Thomas Voeckler (FRA)	Team Europcar	+ 48"
7	Fränk Schleck (LUX)	Leopard Trek	+ 48"
8	Jean-Christophe Péraud (FRA)	Ag2r–La Mondiale	+ 48"
9	Pierre Rolland (FRA)	Team Europcar	+ 48"
10	Ivan Basso (ITA)	Liquigas–Cannondale	+ 48"

General classification after stage 14

Rank	Rider	Team	Time
1	Thomas Voeckler (FRA)	Team Europcar	61h 04' 10"
2	Fränk Schleck (LUX)	Leopard Trek	+ 1' 49"
3	Cadel Evans (AUS)	BMC Racing Team	+ 2' 06"
4	Andy Schleck (LUX)	Leopard Trek	+ 2' 15"
5	Ivan Basso (ITA)	Liquigas–Cannondale	+ 3' 16"
6	Samuel Sánchez (ESP)	Euskaltel–Euskadi	+ 3' 44"
7	Damiano Cunego (ITA)	Lampre–ISD	+ 4' 01"
8	Tom Danielson (USA)	Garmin–Cervélo	+ 5' 46"
9	Kevin De Weert (BEL)	Quick-Step	+ 6' 18"
10	Rigoberto Urán (COL)	Team Sky	+ 7' 55"

== Stage 15 ==
17 July 2011 — Limoux to Montpellier, 192.5 km (120 mi)

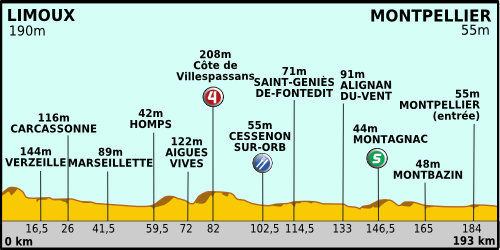

On the last largely flat stage before the final day of the race, the main breakaway group of the day had five members; and was established from the beginning of the stage. The group—Mickaël Delage (FDJ), Niki Terpstra (Quick-Step), Samuel Dumoulin (Cofidis), Mikhail Ignatiev (Team Katusha) and Anthony Delaplace (Saur–Sojasun)—was never more than three minutes clear of the peloton and as the catch approached, Ignatiev and Terpstra moved clear of their colleagues. Terpstra was the last member of the group to be caught, with about 3 km (2 mi) remaining; despite some attempts at late breakaways including one by Philippe Gilbert, sprinters dominated the finish, with Mark Cavendish winning his fourth stage of the race ahead of Tyler Farrar and Alessandro Petacchi.

Stage 15 result

Rank	Rider	Team	Time
1	Mark Cavendish (GBR)	HTC–Highroad	4h 20' 24"
2	Tyler Farrar (USA)	Garmin–Cervélo	s.t.
3	Alessandro Petacchi (ITA)	Lampre–ISD	s.t.
4	Daniel Oss (ITA)	Liquigas–Cannondale	s.t.
5	José Joaquín Rojas (ESP)	Movistar Team	s.t.
6	Ben Swift (GBR)	Team Sky	s.t.
7	Gerald Ciolek (GER)	Quick-Step	s.t.
8	Tony Gallopin (FRA)	Cofidis	s.t.
9	Francisco Ventoso (ESP)	Movistar Team	s.t.
10	Sébastien Hinault (FRA)	Ag2r–La Mondiale	s.t.

General classification after stage 15

Rank	Rider	Team	Time
1	Thomas Voeckler (FRA)	Team Europcar	65h 24' 34"
2	Fränk Schleck (LUX)	Leopard Trek	+ 1' 49"
3	Cadel Evans (AUS)	BMC Racing Team	+ 2' 06"
4	Andy Schleck (LUX)	Leopard Trek	+ 2' 15"
5	Ivan Basso (ITA)	Liquigas–Cannondale	+ 3' 16"
6	Samuel Sánchez (ESP)	Euskaltel–Euskadi	+ 3' 44"
7	Damiano Cunego (ITA)	Lampre–ISD	+ 4' 01"
8	Tom Danielson (USA)	Garmin–Cervélo	+ 5' 46"
9	Kevin De Weert (BEL)	Quick-Step	+ 6' 18"
10	Rigoberto Urán (COL)	Team Sky	+ 7' 55"

== Stage 16 ==
19 July 2011 — Saint-Paul-Trois-Châteaux to Gap, 162.5 km (101 mi)

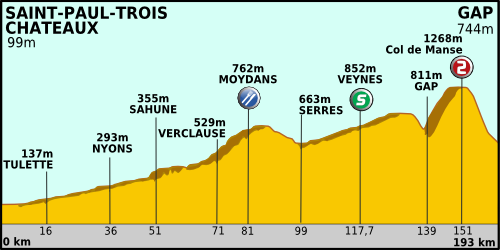

The first stage to enter the Alps had a very high pace for the first two hours, with no break from the peloton until the second half of the stage. Ten riders eventually moved clear of the peloton, but extended their margin rapidly to six minutes. After an unsuccessful attempt to move ahead of the bunch by Mikhail Ignatiev (Team Katusha), Ryder Hesjedal (Garmin–Cervélo) got clear to lead over the category 2 mountain. He was eventually caught by his teammate Thor Hushovd and another Norwegian, Edvald Boasson Hagen (Team Sky), before Hushovd went on to win the stage, his second of the tour. On the ascent of the Col de Manse, Alberto Contador made two attacks, the second of which was successful, with Cadel Evans and Samuel Sánchez joining him in taking a time advantage on the stage over the other riders in contention for high placings in the general classification, and more than a minute over Andy Schleck.

Stage 16 result

Rank	Rider	Team	Time
1	Thor Hushovd (NOR)	Garmin–Cervélo	3h 31' 38"
2	Edvald Boasson Hagen (NOR)	Team Sky	s.t.
3	Ryder Hesjedal (CAN)	Garmin–Cervélo	+ 2"
4	Tony Martin (GER)	HTC–Highroad	+ 38"
5	Mikhail Ignatiev (RUS)	Team Katusha	+ 52"
6	Alan Pérez (ESP)	Euskaltel–Euskadi	+ 1' 25"
7	Jérémy Roy (FRA)	FDJ	+ 1' 25"
8	Marco Marcato (ITA)	Vacansoleil–DCM	+ 1' 55"
9	Dries Devenyns (BEL)	Quick-Step	+ 1' 55"
10	Andriy Hryvko (UKR)	Astana	+ 1' 58"

General classification after stage 16

Rank	Rider	Team	Time
1	Thomas Voeckler (FRA)	Team Europcar	69h 00' 56"
2	Cadel Evans (AUS)	BMC Racing Team	+ 1' 45"
3	Fränk Schleck (LUX)	Leopard Trek	+ 1' 49"
4	Andy Schleck (LUX)	Leopard Trek	+ 3' 03"
5	Samuel Sánchez (ESP)	Euskaltel–Euskadi	+ 3' 26"
6	Ivan Basso (ITA)	Liquigas–Cannondale	+ 3' 49"
7	Damiano Cunego (ITA)	Lampre–ISD	+ 4' 01"
8	Tom Danielson (USA)	Garmin–Cervélo	+ 6' 04"
9	Rigoberto Urán (COL)	Team Sky	+ 7' 55"
10	Jean-Christophe Péraud (FRA)	Ag2r–La Mondiale	+ 8' 20"

== Stage 17 ==
20 July 2011 — Gap to Pinerolo (Italy), 179 km (111 mi)

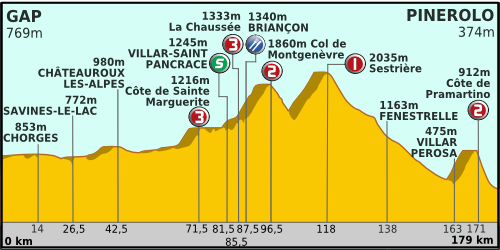

This stage had five categorised climbs, but as with the preceding stage, finished with a descent. More than 60 km (37 mi) had passed before any break was established, but a group of fourteen riders finally got clear and extended their lead to over eight minutes. From that group, Rubén Pérez (Euskaltel–Euskadi) broke away to be first over the Col de Sestriere, but was caught by a counterattack on the final climb initiated by Sylvain Chavanel (Quick-Step), which also included Edvald Boasson Hagen (Team Sky), Bauke Mollema (Rabobank) and Jonathan Hivert (Saur–Sojasun). Boasson Hagen led over the final mountain and retained his lead on the descent to win the stage, while Hivert left the road twice and thus enabled Mollema to take second place. Among the General Classification contenders both Alberto Contador and Andy Schleck were aggressive on the last climb, but were unable to drop their opponents, while on the descent an attack initiated by yellow jersey wearer Thomas Voeckler, accompanied by Contador and Samuel Sánchez, was able to escape the group. Voeckler went off the road on two corners on the descent; and although Contador and Sánchez were able to stay clear for most of the descent, they were caught by a group that included all the other members of the top eight in the overall ranking—apart from Voeckler and Ivan Basso, who both conceded 27 seconds to their rivals.

Stage 17 result

Rank	Rider	Team	Time
1	Edvald Boasson Hagen (NOR)	Team Sky	4h 18' 00"
2	Bauke Mollema (NED)	Rabobank	+ 40"
3	Sandy Casar (FRA)	FDJ	+ 50"
4	Julien El Fares (FRA)	Cofidis	+ 50"
5	Sylvain Chavanel (FRA)	Quick-Step	+ 50"
6	Dmitry Fofonov (KAZ)	Astana	+ 1' 10"
7	Maciej Paterski (POL)	Liquigas–Cannondale	+ 1' 10"
8	Dimitry Muravyev (KAZ)	Team RadioShack	+ 1' 10"
9	Jonathan Hivert (FRA)	Saur–Sojasun	+ 1' 15"
10	Borut Božič (SLO)	Vacansoleil–DCM	+ 2' 20"

General classification after stage 17

Rank	Rider	Team	Time
1	Thomas Voeckler (FRA)	Team Europcar	73h 23' 49"
2	Cadel Evans (AUS)	BMC Racing Team	+ 1' 18"
3	Fränk Schleck (LUX)	Leopard Trek	+ 1' 22"
4	Andy Schleck (LUX)	Leopard Trek	+ 2' 36"
5	Samuel Sánchez (ESP)	Euskaltel–Euskadi	+ 2' 59"
6	Damiano Cunego (ITA)	Lampre–ISD	+ 3' 34"
7	Ivan Basso (ITA)	Liquigas–Cannondale	+ 3' 49"
8	Tom Danielson (USA)	Garmin–Cervélo	+ 6' 04"
9	Rigoberto Urán (COL)	Team Sky	+ 7' 36"
10	Jean-Christophe Péraud (FRA)	Ag2r–La Mondiale	+ 7' 53"

== Stage 18 ==
21 July 2011 — Pinerolo (Italy) to Col du Galibier–Serre Chevalier, 200.5 km (125 mi)

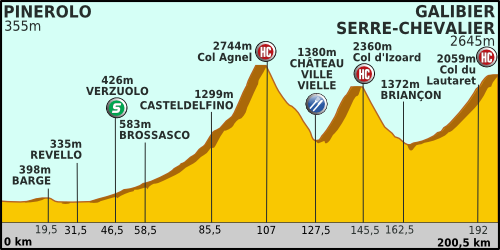

This stage had three highest category climbs, including both the highest point of the 2011 Tour and the highest finish in the history of the race. A group of 14 riders made a break after 45 km (28 mi), and their lead reached nine minutes, but dropped to five and a half by the time Maxim Iglinsky (Astana) led over the Col Agnel. The lead group had been reduced to six by the top of the second climb, the Col d'Izoard, which Iglinski again passed first, but by this time the group of favourites for the overall race had been affected by a solo attack by Andy Schleck. He gained two minutes on the remaining part of that climb, and had assistance from Joost Posthuma and Maxime Monfort, members of his Leopard Trek team who had been in the early break. The group of the remaining leading General Classification competitors seemed poorly co-ordinated, and with 10 km (6 mi) to go, Schleck had reached the head of the race with an advantage of 4:24 over the yellow jersey group. Cadel Evans was the pace setter for the group in pursuit of Schleck, and some of the leading challengers lost time to the pursuing group, including Alberto Contador and Samuel Sánchez. Andy Schleck's winning margin was reduced at the end of the stage to a little over two minutes, with his brother Fränk passing the remnants of the chase group to take second place. Thomas Voeckler retained the overall race lead, although his advantage was reduced to 15 seconds. More than half the field finished outside the cut-off time for elimination, but were reprieved and instead penalised by the loss of 20 points, which meant that José Joaquín Rojas moved to 15 points behind Mark Cavendish in the competition for the green jersey.

Stage 18 result

Rank	Rider	Team	Time
1	Andy Schleck (LUX)	Leopard Trek	6h 07' 56"
2	Fränk Schleck (LUX)	Leopard Trek	+ 2' 07"
3	Cadel Evans (AUS)	BMC Racing Team	+ 2' 15"
4	Ivan Basso (ITA)	Liquigas–Cannondale	+ 2' 18"
5	Thomas Voeckler (FRA)	Team Europcar	+ 2' 21"
6	Pierre Rolland (FRA)	Team Europcar	+ 2' 27"
7	Damiano Cunego (ITA)	Lampre–ISD	+ 2' 33"
8	Rein Taaramäe (EST)	Cofidis	+ 3' 22"
9	Tom Danielson (USA)	Garmin–Cervélo	+ 3' 25"
10	Ryder Hesjedal (CAN)	Garmin–Cervélo	+ 3' 31"

General classification after stage 18

Rank	Rider	Team	Time
1	Thomas Voeckler (FRA)	Team Europcar	79h 34' 06"
2	Andy Schleck (LUX)	Leopard Trek	+ 15"
3	Fränk Schleck (LUX)	Leopard Trek	+ 1' 08"
4	Cadel Evans (AUS)	BMC Racing Team	+ 1' 12"
5	Damiano Cunego (ITA)	Lampre–ISD	+ 3' 46"
6	Ivan Basso (ITA)	Liquigas–Cannondale	+ 3' 46"
7	Samuel Sánchez (ESP)	Euskaltel–Euskadi	+ 5' 20"
8	Tom Danielson (USA)	Garmin–Cervélo	+ 7' 08"
9	Jean-Christophe Péraud (FRA)	Ag2r–La Mondiale	+ 9' 27"
10	Rein Taaramäe (EST)	Cofidis	+ 9' 36"

== Stage 19 ==
22 July 2011 — Modane to Alpe d'Huez, 109.5 km (68 mi)

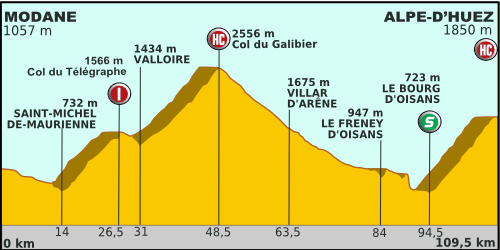

Yellow Jersey signed by Andy Schleck (Collection KOERS. Museum of Cycle Racing)

This was the shortest stage of the tour, other than time trials, and featured three mountains. Although a 14-man break had moved ahead of the peloton within the first 10 km (6 mi), the race was animated by a break by Alberto Contador after 16 km (10 mi). He was joined in the break by yellow jersey wearer Thomas Voeckler, Andy Schleck and Cadel Evans, but another acceleration 5 km (3 mi) later left only Schleck able to stay with Contador. Evans soon afterwards had a mechanical issue with his bicycle, and waited for the peloton to catch him up, while Voeckler opted to try to follow Contador and Schleck alone. By the top of the first climb, the Col du Télégraphe, Contador and Schleck had passed most of the first breakaway group, and in passing the col second behind Gorka Izagirre, Schleck became virtual leader of the mountains classification on the last day that points were available in that competition.

The climb to the Col du Galibier saw the front group reduced to four men: Contador, Schleck, Rui Costa and Christophe Riblon; Samuel Sánchez counter-attacked to join the group on the descent, while Voeckler dropped to the pursuit group that included the other leading riders in the general classification. The advantage of the leaders over the chase group dropped from its maximum of nearly two minutes to 42 seconds by the top of the Galibier, by which time Voeckler had been dropped to a third group. The chase group caught up with the leaders by the bottom of the valley, and the larger group was also joined by the yellow jersey group before the beginning of the climb to Alpe d'Huez. Ryder Hesjedal and Pierre Rolland had attacked along the valley, and led by some 38 seconds at the beginning of the climb. Attacks at the foot of the climb by Jakob Fuglsang, and then by Evans and Bauke Mollema, were unable to escape the group, but Contador was again able to break clear. When he caught Rolland and Hesjedal, the Canadian immediately fell away, while Rolland was able to stay with Contador for some time. The following group gradually diminished in numbers, and Voeckler dropped back, eventually finishing in 20th place. Shortly after Contador moved clear into the lead on his own, with 10 km (6 mi) remaining, Peter Velits and Sánchez broke from the pursuit group. Sánchez caught up with Rolland, and the pair drew closer to Contador, while the two favourites for the general classification, Andy Schleck and Cadel Evans, rode in close proximity.

Sánchez and Rolland caught up with the rapidly tiring Contador with 2.5 km (2 mi) remaining, and Rolland immediately attacked and went on to win the stage and take the lead in the young riders' competition. The two Spaniards worked together for a while, before Sánchez, in an effort that was to secure him the polka-dot jersey of the top climber, moved on to take second place. Despite a flurry of late attacks, Evans and both Schleck brothers finished on the same time. Andy Schleck assumed leadership of the overall classification. As had happened on the previous stage, more than half the field had to rely on a reprieve from the commissionaires having missed the cut-off time, but the penalty points made little difference to the green jersey competition as the two leaders in that classification both received the same sanction.

Stage 19 result

Rank	Rider	Team	Time
1	Pierre Rolland (FRA)	Team Europcar	3h 13' 25"
2	Samuel Sánchez (ESP)	Euskaltel–Euskadi	+ 14"
3	Peter Velits (SVK)	HTC–Highroad	+ 57"
4	Cadel Evans (AUS)	BMC Racing Team	+ 57"
5	Thomas De Gendt (BEL)	Vacansoleil–DCM	+ 57"
6	Damiano Cunego (ITA)	Lampre–ISD	+ 57"
7	Fränk Schleck (LUX)	Leopard Trek	+ 57"
8	Andy Schleck (LUX)	Leopard Trek	+ 57"
9	Ryder Hesjedal (CAN)	Garmin–Cervélo	+ 1' 15"
10	Tom Danielson (USA)	Garmin–Cervélo	+ 1' 15"

General classification after stage 19

Rank	Rider	Team	Time
1	Andy Schleck (LUX)	Leopard Trek	82h 48' 43"
2	Fränk Schleck (LUX)	Leopard Trek	+ 53"
3	Cadel Evans (AUS)	BMC Racing Team	+ 57"
4	Thomas Voeckler (FRA)	Team Europcar	+ 2' 10"
5	Damiano Cunego (ITA)	Lampre–ISD	+ 3' 31"
6	Samuel Sánchez (ESP)	Euskaltel–Euskadi	+ 4' 22"
7	Ivan Basso (ITA)	Liquigas–Cannondale	+ 4' 40"
8	Tom Danielson (USA)	Garmin–Cervélo	+ 7' 11"
9	Pierre Rolland (FRA)	Team Europcar	+ 8' 57"
10	Jean-Christophe Péraud (FRA)	Ag2r–La Mondiale	+ 9' 42"

== Stage 20 ==
23 July 2011 — Grenoble, 42.5 km (26 mi) individual time trial (ITT)

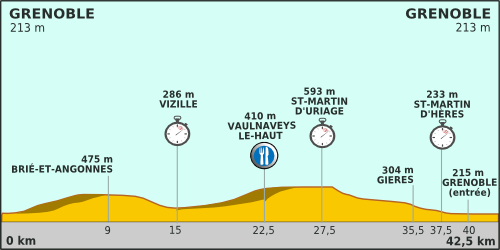

In the final competitive stage of the race, riders left in reverse order of their standings in the general classification. Fabian Cancellara, the world champion at the time trial, was widely considered favourite to win the stage, and his time was the fastest for some time, but it was surpassed by Richie Porte and, shortly after, by Thomas De Gendt, before Tony Martin set the best time at every intermediate checkpoint, and at the stage finish, times which remained unbeaten. Pierre Rolland, although he lost his place in the top ten to Jean-Christophe Péraud, was able to retain his lead in the young riders' category ahead of Rein Taaramäe. Defending champion Alberto Contador, in posting the time which was second at the time, moved up one place in the overall rankings, before the final three riders, whose compared times were to be decisive in the final positions for the tour. It was widely expected that the 57 second advantage that Andy Schleck had over Cadel Evans at the beginning of the stage would leave the pair very closely matched, but even by the first checkpoint in seemed evident that Evans would more than make up the deficit. Evans beat Contador's time, to take second on the stage, and to pass both Andy and Fränk Schleck and assume the lead in the overall classification.

Stage 20 result

	Rider	Team	Time			
	Rider	Team	15.0 km	27.5 km	37.5 km	Finish
1	Tony Martin (GER)	HTC–Highroad	20' 12"	40' 26"	49' 53"	55' 33"
2	Cadel Evans (AUS)	BMC Racing Team	+ 21"	+ 7"	+ 2"	+ 7"
3	Thomas De Gendt (BEL)	Vacansoleil–DCM	+ 25"	+ 38"	+ 1' 06"	+ 1' 29"
4	Richie Porte (AUS)	Saxo Bank–SunGard	+ 1' 02"	+ 1' 03"	+ 1' 24"	+ 1' 30"
5	Jean-Christophe Péraud (FRA)	Ag2r–La Mondiale	+ 47"	+ 1' 13"	+ 1' 26"	+ 1' 33"
6	Samuel Sánchez (ESP)	Euskaltel–Euskadi	+ 44"	+ 1' 08"	+ 1' 19"	+ 1' 37"
7	Fabian Cancellara (SUI)	Leopard Trek	+ 30"	+ 1' 02"	+ 1' 29"	+ 1' 42"
8	Peter Velits (SVK)	HTC–Highroad	+ 34"	+ 1' 29"	+ 1' 46"	+ 2' 03"
9	Rein Taaramäe (EST)	Cofidis	+ 43"	+ 1' 26"	+ 1' 50"	+ 2' 03"
10	Tom Danielson (USA)	Garmin–Cervélo	+ 45"	+ 1' 26"	+ 1' 52"	+ 2' 08"

General classification after stage 20

Rank	Rider	Team	Time
1	Cadel Evans (AUS)	BMC Racing Team	83h 45' 20"
2	Andy Schleck (LUX)	Leopard Trek	+ 1' 34"
3	Fränk Schleck (LUX)	Leopard Trek	+ 2' 30"
4	Thomas Voeckler (FRA)	Team Europcar	+ 3' 20"
5	Samuel Sánchez (ESP)	Euskaltel–Euskadi	+ 4' 55"
6	Damiano Cunego (ITA)	Lampre–ISD	+ 6' 05"
7	Ivan Basso (ITA)	Liquigas–Cannondale	+ 7' 23"
8	Tom Danielson (USA)	Garmin–Cervélo	+ 8' 15"
9	Jean-Christophe Péraud (FRA)	Ag2r–La Mondiale	+ 10' 11"
10	Pierre Rolland (FRA)	Team Europcar	+ 10' 43"

== Stage 21 ==
24 July 2011 — Créteil to Paris (Champs-Élysées), 95 km (59 mi)

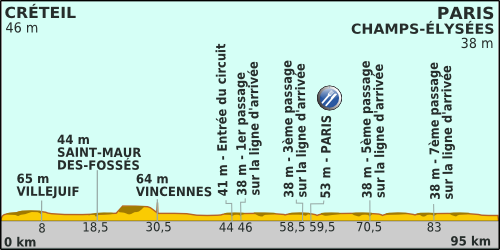

After a silent tribute to Laurent Fignon and the victims of the attacks in Oslo and Utøya Island, and in keeping with tradition, the final stage began at a slow pace, and was a largely ceremonial procession through the suburbs of Paris. Shortly after the riders reached the circuit in the centre of the city, racing began in earnest, and after various unsuccessful attempts, the main break was initiated by Ben Swift (Team Sky) with 40 km to go, and he was joined by Kristjan Koren (Liquigas–Cannondale), Sergio Paulinho (Team RadioShack), Christophe Riblon (Ag2r–La Mondiale) and Lars Bak (HTC–Highroad). At the intermediate sprint, with 35 km remaining, Mark Cavendish (HTC–Highroad) extended his lead in the points competition, and shortly after that the breakaway reached its greatest advantage at 45 seconds. As the peloton closed down their advantage, mainly through the work of Quick-Step and Lampre–ISD, the breakaway lost members, until in the final kilometre only Bak remained clear, but the closing peloton was being driven by his own team. The lead-out train for Cavendish led the race through the final corners, and he won the final stage for the third successive year, a record, to become the first British winner of the green jersey. The leaders of the other three categories finished in the peloton to secure their victories, and the traditional prize-giving was made shortly after the race.

Stage 21 result

Rank	Rider	Team	Time
1	Mark Cavendish (GBR)	HTC–Highroad	2h 27' 02"
2	Edvald Boasson Hagen (NOR)	Team Sky	s.t.
3	André Greipel (GER)	Omega Pharma–Lotto	s.t.
4	Tyler Farrar (USA)	Garmin–Cervélo	s.t.
5	Fabian Cancellara (SUI)	Leopard Trek	s.t.
6	Daniel Oss (ITA)	Liquigas–Cannondale	s.t.
7	Borut Božič (SLO)	Vacansoleil–DCM	s.t.
8	Tomas Vaitkus (LTU)	Astana	s.t.
9	Gerald Ciolek (GER)	Quick-Step	s.t.
10	Jimmy Engoulvent (FRA)	Saur–Sojasun	s.t.

Final General Classification

Rank	Rider	Team	Time
1	Cadel Evans (AUS)	BMC Racing Team	86h 12' 22"
2	Andy Schleck (LUX)	Leopard Trek	+ 1' 34"
3	Fränk Schleck (LUX)	Leopard Trek	+ 2' 30"
4	Thomas Voeckler (FRA)	Team Europcar	+ 3' 20"
5	Samuel Sánchez (ESP)	Euskaltel–Euskadi	+ 4' 55"
6	Damiano Cunego (ITA)	Lampre–ISD	+ 6' 05"
7	Ivan Basso (ITA)	Liquigas–Cannondale	+ 7' 23"
8	Tom Danielson (USA)	Garmin–Cervélo	+ 8' 15"
9	Jean-Christophe Péraud (FRA)	Ag2r–La Mondiale	+ 10' 11"
10	Pierre Rolland (FRA)	Team Europcar	+ 10' 43"
