= 2011 Tour de France =

2011 UCI World Tour, race 17 of 27
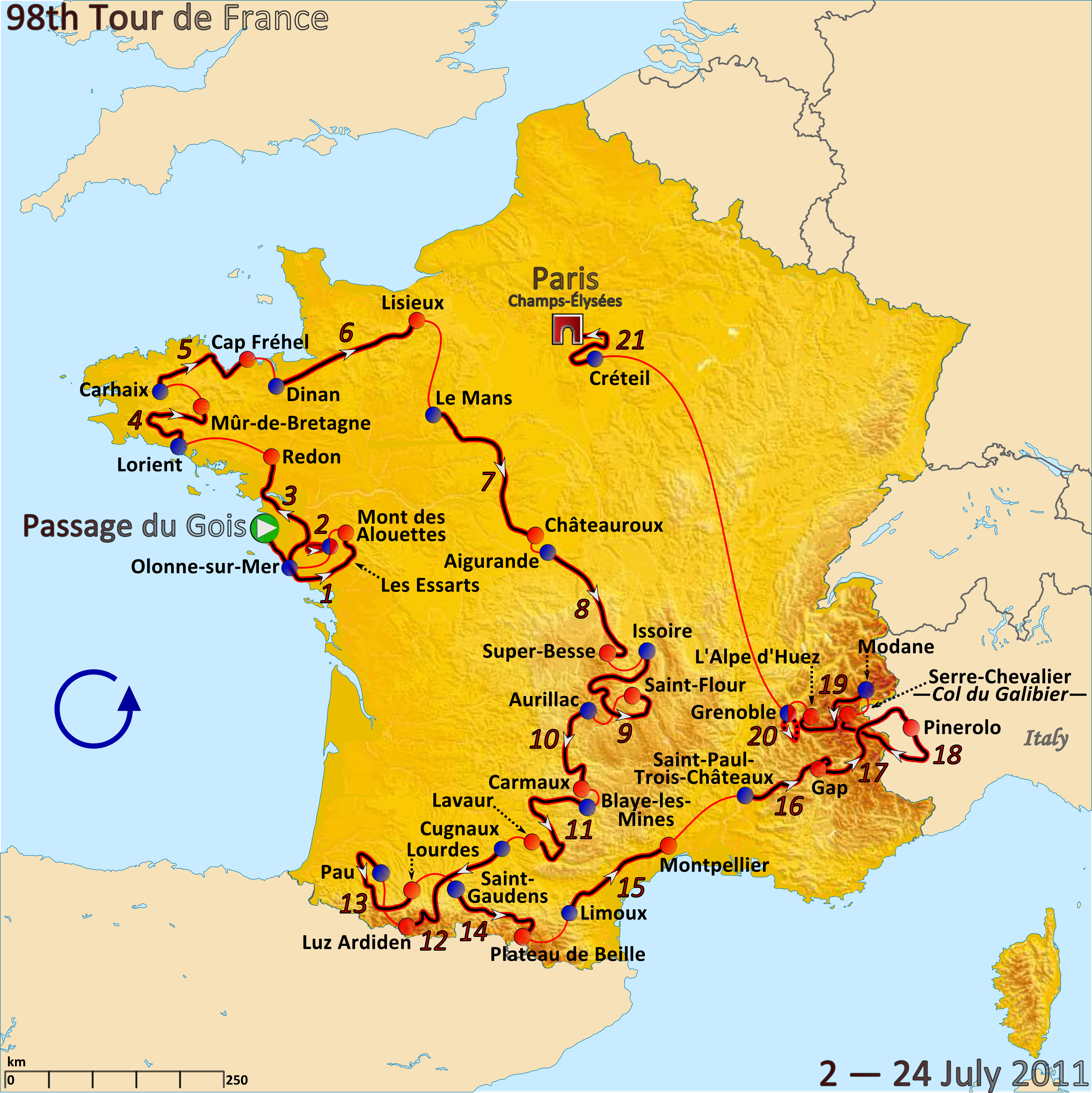
- Route of the 2011 Tour de France

Race details
- Dates: 2–24 July 2011
- Stages: 21
- Distance: 3,430 km (2,130 mi)
- Winning time: 86h 12′ 22″

Results
Jersey awarded to the overall winner	Winner	Cadel Evans (AUS)	(BMC Racing Team)
	Second	Andy Schleck (LUX)	(Leopard Trek)
	Third	Fränk Schleck (LUX)	(Leopard Trek)
Jersey awarded to the points classification winner	Points	Mark Cavendish (GBR)	(HTC–Highroad)
Jersey awarded to the mountains classification winner	Mountains	Samuel Sánchez (ESP)	(Euskaltel–Euskadi)
Jersey awarded to the youth classification winner	Youth	Pierre Rolland (FRA)	(Team Europcar)
Jersey awarded to the combativity classification winner	Combativity	Jérémy Roy (FRA)	(FDJ)
Jersey awarded to the team classification winner	Team	(United States) Garmin–Cervélo	

The 2011 Tour de France was the 98th edition of the race. It started on 2 July at the Passage du Gois and ended on the Champs-Élysées in Paris on 24 July. The cyclists competed in 21 stages over 23 days, covering a distance of 3,430.5 kilometres (2,131.6 mi). The route entered Italy for part of two stages. The emphasis of the route was on the Alps, commemorating the 100th anniversary of the mountain range first being visited in the Tour. Cadel Evans of the BMC Racing Team won the overall general classification. Andy Schleck of Leopard Trek was second, with his brother and teammate Fränk third.

The general classification leader's yellow jersey was worn first by Philippe Gilbert of Omega Pharma–Lotto, who won the opening stage. In the following stage, Garmin–Cervélo's victory in the team time trial put their rider Thor Hushovd into the overall lead. He held the yellow jersey until the end of the ninth stage when it was taken by Thomas Voeckler (Team Europcar), who went on to hold it throughout the stages in the Pyrenees and up until the end of the final Alpine stage. Andy Schleck, who had won the previous stage (the 18th), held it for the following individual time trial; Evans took enough time in this stage to take the yellow jersey. He then held the lead into the finish in Paris.

The race saw Yohann Gène become the first black rider in the history of the Tour. Evans became the first Australian to win the Tour, and the second non-European to have officially done so. At 34, he was also the oldest post-World War II winner being almost a year older than Joop Zoetemelk was when he won the 1980 edition. HTC–Highroad's Mark Cavendish was the first British winner of the points classification, Samuel Sánchez (Euskaltel–Euskadi) won the mountains classification and Pierre Rolland of Team Europcar won the young rider classification. The team classification was won by Garmin–Cervélo and the overall super-combativity award was given to Jérémy Roy (FDJ).

== Teams ==
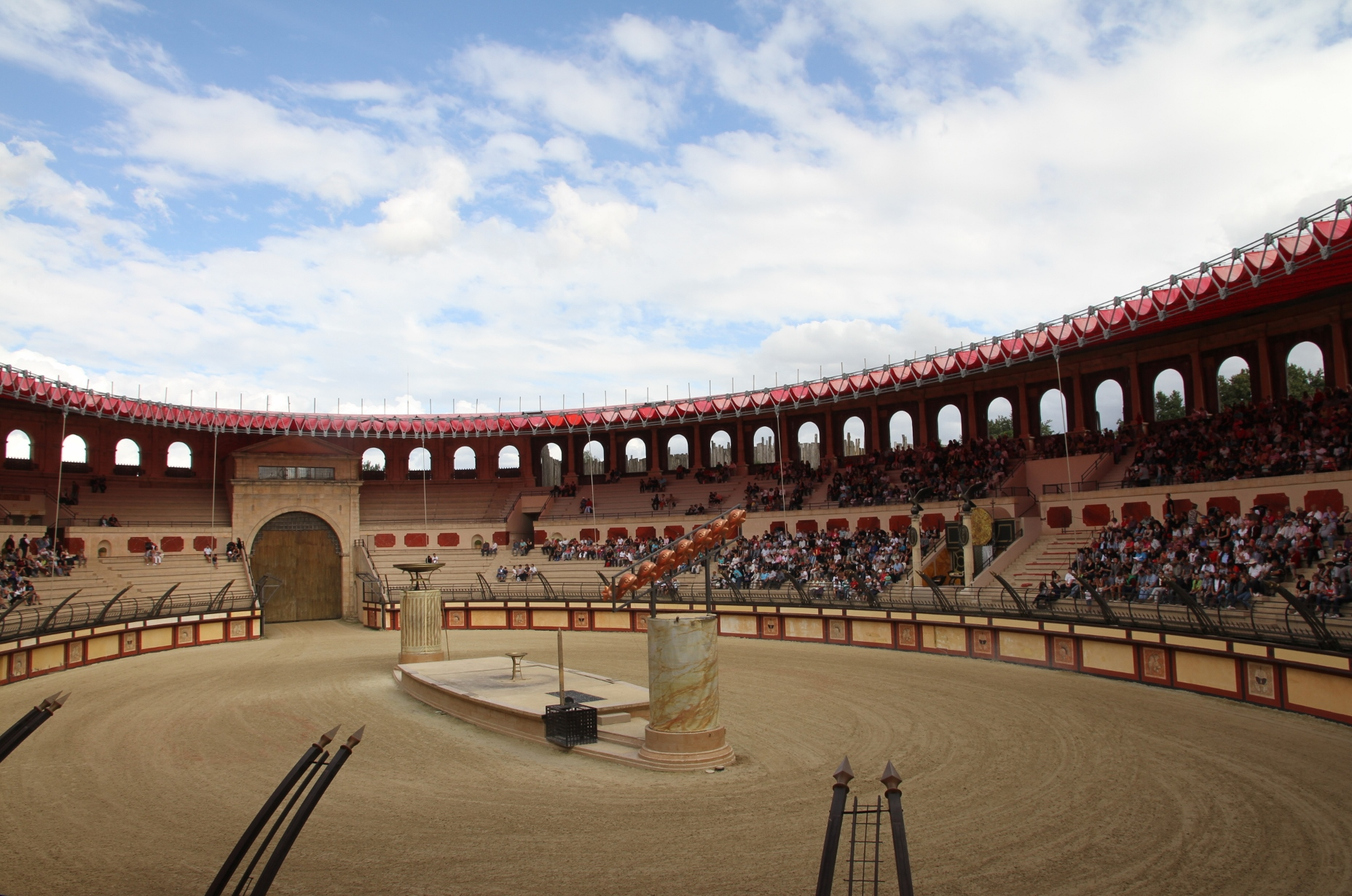
The Roman amphitheatre at the Puy du Fou theme park hosted the team presentation ceremony on 30 June.

Twenty-two teams participated in the 2011 edition of the Tour de France. The race was the 17th of the 27 events in the UCI World Tour, and all of its eighteen UCI ProTeams were entitled, and obliged, to enter the race. On 19 January 2011, the organiser of the Tour, Amaury Sport Organisation (ASO), announced the four second-tier UCI Professional Continental teams given wildcard invitations, all of which were French-based. One team, the Spanish-based Geox–TMC, which included the third-placed rider in the 2010 Tour, Denis Menchov, and the 2008 Tour winner, Carlos Sastre, was overlooked. The presentation of the teams – where the members of each team's roster are introduced in front of the media and local dignitaries – took place in front of audience of 7,000 inside the Roman amphitheatre at the Puy du Fou theme park in Les Epesses, Vendée, on 30 June, two days before the opening stage.

Each squad was allowed a maximum of nine riders, resulting in a start list total of 198 riders. Of these, 49 were riding the Tour de France for the first time. The riders came from 30 countries; France, Spain, Italy, Belgium, Germany, Netherlands and United States all had 12 or more riders in the race. Riders from ten countries won stages during the race; British riders won the largest number of stages, with five. The average age of riders in the race was 29.38 years, ranging from the 21-year-old Anthony Delaplace (Saur–Sojasun) to the 39-year-old Jens Voigt (Leopard Trek). Of the total average ages, FDJ was the youngest team and Team RadioShack the oldest.

The teams entering the race were:

UCI ProTeams

- Ag2r–La Mondiale
- Astana
- BMC Racing Team
- Euskaltel–Euskadi
- Garmin–Cervélo
- HTC–Highroad
- Team Katusha
- Lampre–ISD
- Leopard Trek
- Liquigas–Cannondale
- Movistar Team
- Omega Pharma–Lotto
- Quick-Step
- Rabobank
- Team RadioShack
- Saxo Bank–SunGard
- Team Sky
- Vacansoleil–DCM

UCI Professional Continental teams

- Cofidis
- Team Europcar
- FDJ
- Saur–Sojasun

== Pre-race favourites ==
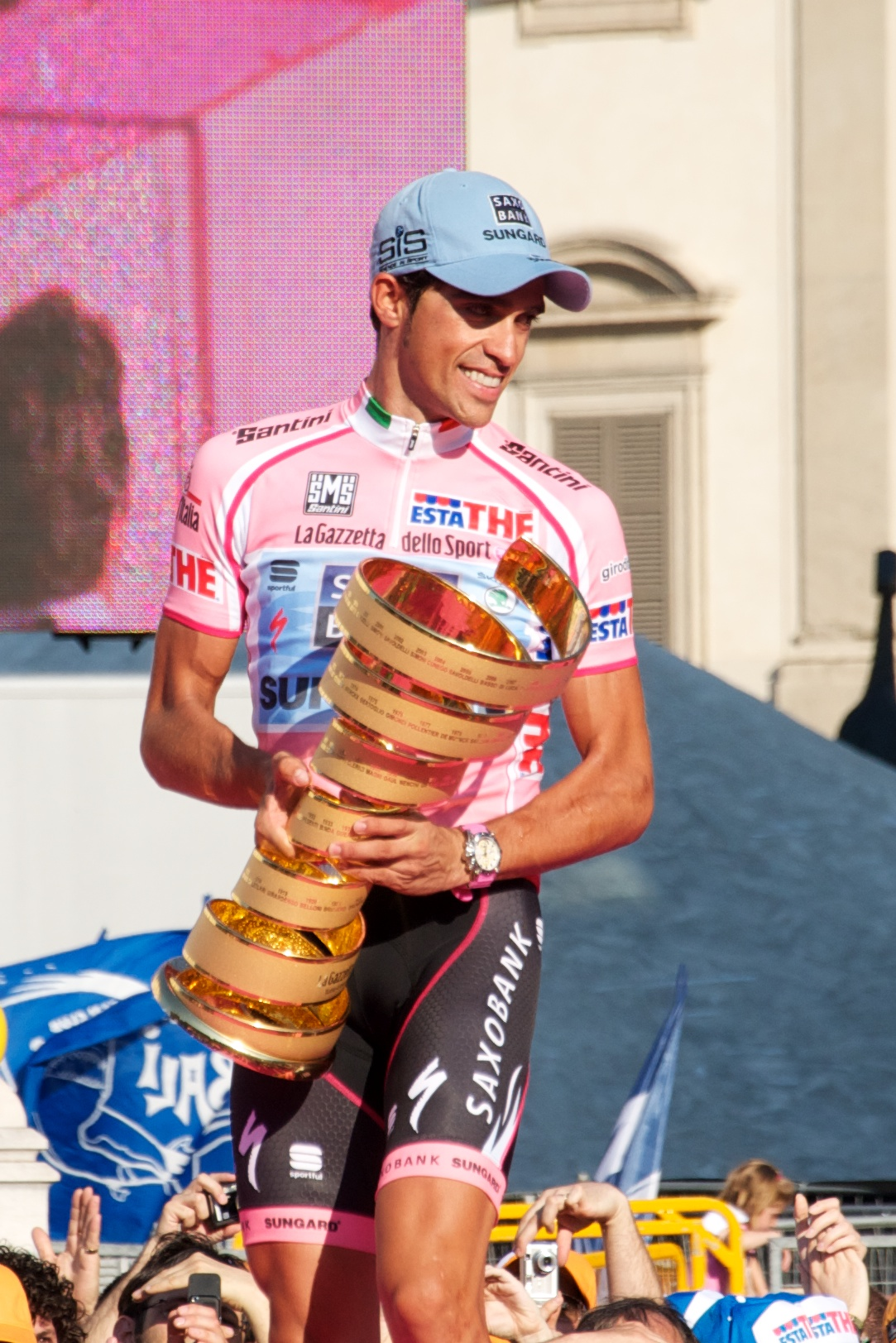
Alberto Contador's now-disqualified Giro d'Italia victory made him the leading contender for the Tour's general classification.

In the lead-up to the Tour, Alberto Contador (Saxo Bank–SunGard), winner of the 2007 and 2009 Tours, was widely considered as the top pre-race favourite for the general classification. His closest rivals were thought to be Andy Schleck (Leopard Trek) and Cadel Evans (BMC Racing Team). The other riders considered contenders for the general classification were Bradley Wiggins (Team Sky), Ivan Basso (Liquigas–Cannondale), Robert Gesink (Rabobank), Samuel Sánchez (Euskaltel–Euskadi), Chris Horner (Team RadioShack), Fränk Schleck (Leopard Trek) and Jurgen Van den Broeck (Omega Pharma–Lotto).

In September 2010, Contador announced that he had tested positive for the banned clenbuterol from a sample taken during his now-disqualified 2010 Tour victory. He was suspended from racing during an investigation until February 2011. When cleared to race he competed in and won the general classifications of the Vuelta a Murcia, Volta a Catalunya and Giro d'Italia before the Tour. With overall victory in the Tour he was aiming to complete the Giro-Tour double, last achieved by Marco Pantani in the 1998 Tour. Schleck had placed second to Contador in the previous two Tours and won the young rider classification in the previous three. In the lead up to the Tour his best results were third in the one-day race Liège–Bastogne–Liège and the mountains classification of the Tour de Suisse. Evans, podium finisher in the 2007 and 2008 Tours, had a successful season before the Tour, winning the general classifications of both the Tour de Romandie and Tirreno–Adriatico, as well as second place in the Critérium du Dauphiné.

The sprinters named as the "riders to watch" by Bicycling magazine and possible contenders for the points classification and wins on the flat or hilly bunch sprint finishes were Mark Cavendish (HTC–Highroad), Philippe Gilbert (Omega Pharma–Lotto) and Garmin–Cervélo riders Tyler Farrar and Thor Hushovd. Former winners of the points classification and notable sprinters included in the startlist were the defending champion, Alessandro Petacchi (Lampre–ISD), and the winner in 2007, Tom Boonen (Quick-Step). The points classification winner of the 2002, 2004 and 2006 Tours, 39-year-old Robbie McEwen, was not selected by his team for the race, Team RadioShack. Óscar Freire of Rabobank was another former winner (2008) left out of his team's Tour squad.

Cavendish was runner-up in the 2010 Tour's points classification and had won 15 stages in the three previous Tours; he had won a stage at the Tour of Oman, the one-day race Scheldeprijs and two stages at the Giro during the 2011 season prior to the Tour. Gilbert had amassed a total of eleven wins (not including the national championships) for the season before the Tour, including three spring classics: Liège–Bastogne–Liège, Amstel Gold Race and La Flèche Wallonne. Farrar's form in the lead-up to the Tour included a stage win in both Tirreno–Adriatico and the Ster ZLM Toer. Hushovd, the world road race champion, only had one win in the season before the Tour, a stage of the Tour de Suisse. Petacchi's best results prior the Tour were a trio of stages in the Giro, the Volta a Catalunya and the Tour of Turkey. The major victory of Boonen's season up to the Tour was the Gent–Wevelgem one-day race.

== Route and stages ==
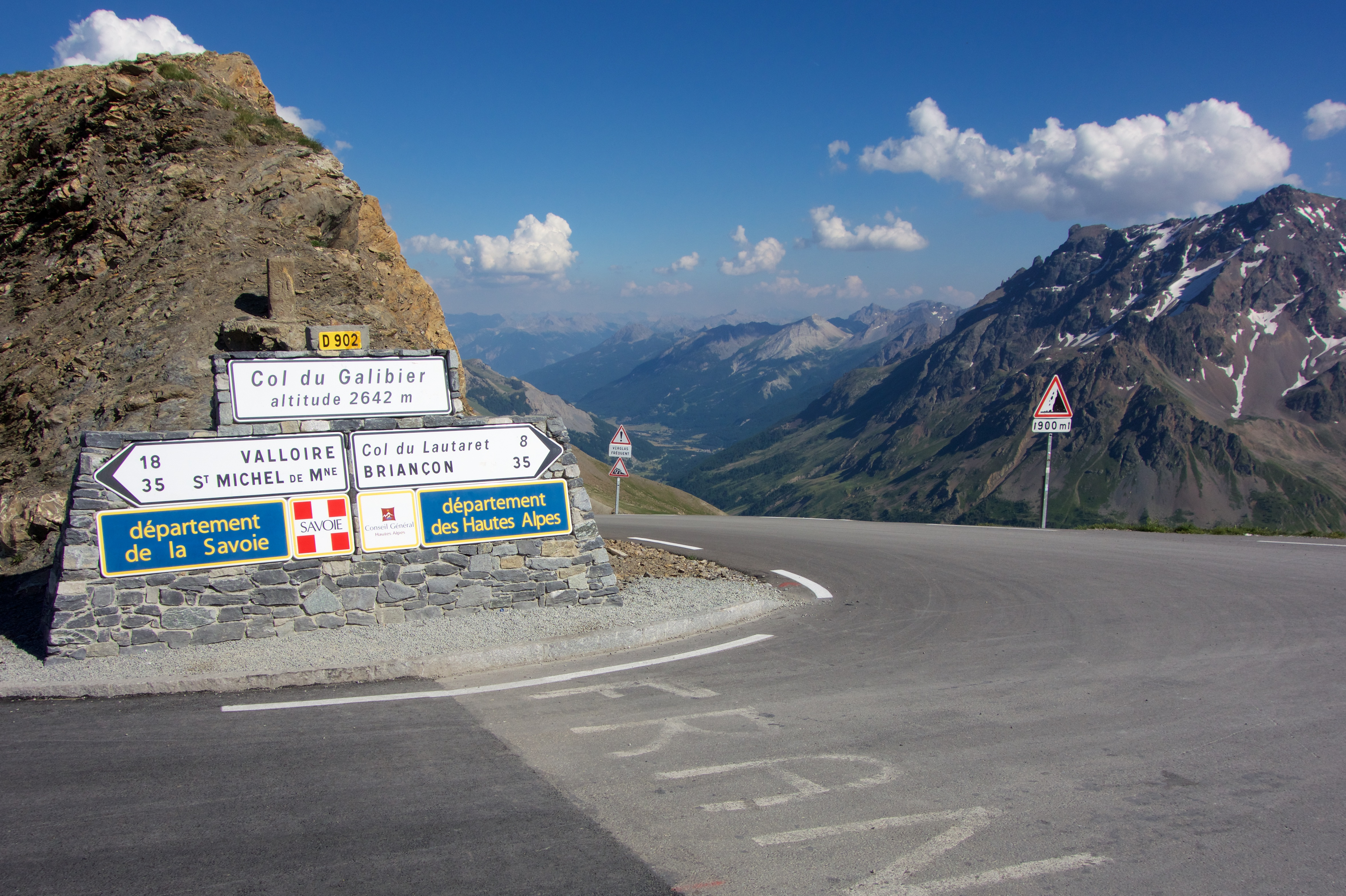
The Col du Galibier in the Alps was climbed twice to celebrate the centenary of the introduction of the mountain range into the Tour.

On 26 January 2010, the race director, Christian Prudhomme, announced that the department of Vendée would host the 2011 edition's opening stage (known as the Grand Départ). It was the fifth time Vendée had hosted the Grand Départ, which consisted of two stages. The entire route was announced by the ASO on 19 October 2010 at the official presentation at the Palais des Congrès in Paris. The route was thought to suit climbing specialists, with Prudhomme saying "We wanted a balanced route. We tried to keep the suspense for the Alps but also to have a big battle as early as the Pyrenees,". To celebrate the centenary of the introduction of the Alps into the Tour it featured two of its most famous climbs, the Col du Galibier and Alpe d'Huez, with the Galibier climbed twice.

The first of the two stages held in Vendée started in Passage du Gois and finished in Mont des Alouettes, whilst stage two was held in Les Essarts. The Tour left Vendée in Olonne-sur-Mer and headed north to Redon for the finish of the third stage. The following two stages took place in the region of Brittany. Stage six left the region to the finish in Lisieux. Stages seven and eight took the race through the middle of the country from Le Mans to the Super Besse resort in the elevated region Massif Central, which hosted stage nine. The following two stages headed south through the lower slopes, and stage twelve took the race into the Pyrenees. The mountain range hosted the next two stages. The fifteenth stage took place between Limoux and Montpellier. Stage sixteen took the route into the Alps. The next two stages took the race into Italy, with Pinerolo hosting between them. Stage nineteen was the last in the Alps, before the twentieth, which was held in the foothills around Grenoble. A long transfer took the Tour to its conclusion in Paris with the Champs-Élysées stage.

There were 21 stages in the race, covering a total distance of 3,430.5 km (2,132 mi), 212 km (131.7 mi) shorter than the 2010 Tour. For only the second time since the 1967 Tour, the race started with a mass-start stage instead of a prologue (an individual time trial under 8 km (5 mi)), the last occasion being in 2008. The longest mass-start stage was the seventh at 218 km (135 mi), and stage 21 was the shortest at 95 km (59 mi). The race featured only 65.5 km (40.7 mi) of time trialling, with stage two's team time trial and stage twenty's individual time trial. Of the remaining stages, ten were officially classified as flat, three as medium mountain and six as high mountain. There were four summit finishes: stage 12, to Luz Ardiden; stage 14, to Plateau de Beille; stage 18, to Col du Galibier; and stage 19, to Alpe d'Huez. It was the first time a stage had finished on the 2,645-metre (8,678 ft)-high Galibier. It was the highest summit finish in Tour history, beating the finish of the 2,413 metres (7,917 ft)-high Col du Granon during the 1986 Tour. The highest point of elevation in the race was the 2,744 m (9,003 ft)-high Col Agnel mountain pass on stage 18. It was among nine hors catégorie (English: beyond category) rated climbs in the race. There were fifteen new stage start or finish locations. The rest days were after stage 9, at the Le Lioran mountain resort, and after 15, in the department of Drôme.

Stage characteristics and winners
Stage	Date	Course	Distance	Type	Winner
1	2 July	Passage du Gois to Mont des Alouettes	191.5 km (119 mi)	Flat stage	Philippe Gilbert (BEL)
2	3 July	Les Essarts	23.0 km (14 mi)	Team time trial	Garmin–Cervélo
3	4 July	Olonne-sur-Mer to Redon	198.0 km (123 mi)	Flat stage	Tyler Farrar (USA)
4	5 July	Lorient to Mûr-de-Bretagne	172.5 km (107 mi)	Flat stage	Cadel Evans (AUS)
5	6 July	Carhaix to Cap Fréhel	164.5 km (102 mi)	Flat stage	Mark Cavendish (GBR)
6	7 July	Dinan to Lisieux	226.5 km (141 mi)	Flat stage	Edvald Boasson Hagen (NOR)
7	8 July	Le Mans to Châteauroux	218.0 km (135 mi)	Flat stage	Mark Cavendish (GBR)
8	9 July	Aigurande to Super Besse	189.0 km (117 mi)	Medium mountain stage	Rui Costa (POR)
9	10 July	Issoire to Saint-Flour	208.0 km (129 mi)	Medium mountain stage	Luis León Sánchez (ESP)
	11 July	Le Lioran		Rest day	
10	12 July	Aurillac to Carmaux	158.0 km (98 mi)	Flat stage	André Greipel (GER)
11	13 July	Blaye-les-Mines to Lavaur	167.5 km (104 mi)	Flat stage	Mark Cavendish (GBR)
12	14 July	Cugnaux to Luz Ardiden	211.0 km (131 mi)	High mountain stage	Samuel Sánchez (ESP)
13	15 July	Pau to Lourdes	152.5 km (95 mi)	High mountain stage	Thor Hushovd (NOR)
14	16 July	Saint-Gaudens to Plateau de Beille	168.5 km (105 mi)	High mountain stage	Jelle Vanendert (BEL)
15	17 July	Limoux to Montpellier	192.5 km (120 mi)	Flat stage	Mark Cavendish (GBR)
	18 July	Drôme		Rest day	
16	19 July	Saint-Paul-Trois-Châteaux to Gap	162.5 km (101 mi)	Medium mountain stage	Thor Hushovd (NOR)
17	20 July	Gap to Pinerolo (Italy)	179.0 km (111 mi)	High mountain stage	Edvald Boasson Hagen (NOR)
18	21 July	Pinerolo (Italy) to Col du Galibier	200.5 km (125 mi)	High mountain stage	Andy Schleck (LUX)
19	22 July	Modane to Alpe d'Huez	109.5 km (68 mi)	High mountain stage	Pierre Rolland (FRA)
20	23 July	Grenoble	42.5 km (26 mi)	Individual time trial	Tony Martin (GER)
21	24 July	Créteil to Paris (Champs-Élysées)	95.0 km (59 mi)	Flat stage	Mark Cavendish (GBR)
	Total		3,430.5 km (2,132 mi)		

== Race overview ==
=== Grand Départ and Massif Central ===
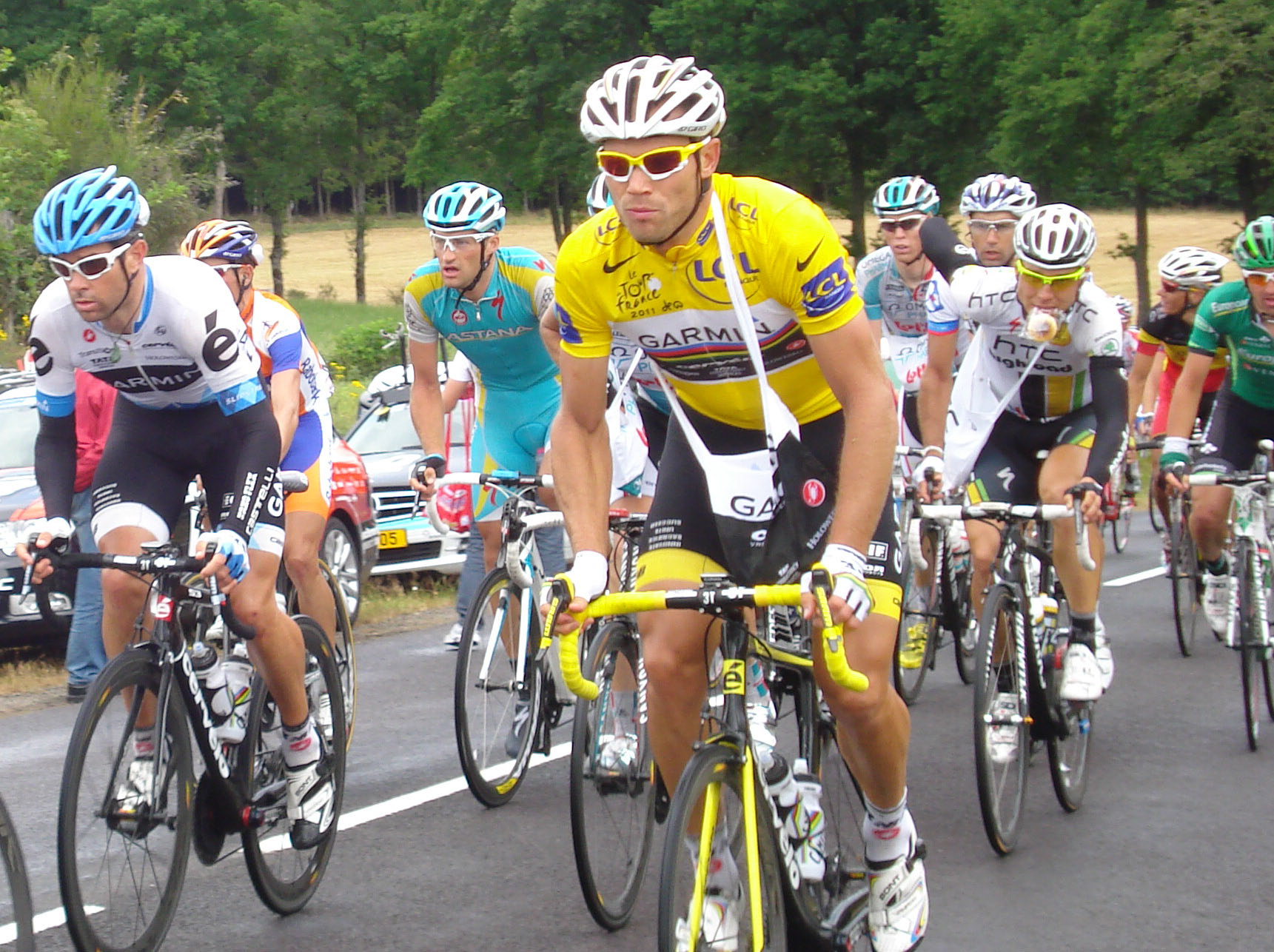
Garmin–Cervélo's Thor Hushovd (pictured in stage eight) wore the race leader's yellow jersey after his team's win in stage two's team time trial until the end of stage eight.

The opening stage's uphill finish of Mont des Alouettes was won by Philippe Gilbert, who took the first yellow jersey as leader of the general classification. He also led the points and mountains classifications. Garmin–Cervélo were the fastest in the 23.0 km (14 mi) team time trial on the second stage, four seconds ahead of second-placed BMC Racing Team. This put Garmin's Thor Hushovd, who was third in stage one, into the yellow jersey. Tyler Farrar won the third stage from a bunch finish. José Joaquín Rojas of Movistar Team, third on the stage, took points classification's green jersey. The following day, a five-rider breakaway group had led the stage after 9 km (6 mi), before the peloton caught on them at the foot of the Mûr-de-Bretagne climb. After a series of attacks, a group of nine riders moved clear, and Cadel Evans won the subsequent sprint finish. Evans took the polka dot jersey as leader of the mountains classification. Mark Cavendish won stage five from a bunch sprint, with second-placed Gilbert taking the green jersey. The sixth stage was won by Team Sky's Edvald Boasson Hagen, who won the hilly bunch sprint in Lisieux. Johnny Hoogerland (Vacansoleil–DCM) took the polka dot jersey.

Cavendish won the stage seven's bunch sprint finish. Rojas regained the green jersey. A crash around 40 km (25 mi) from the end of the stage forced general classification contender Bradley Wiggins out of the race with a clavicle fracture. Another overall contender involved in the crash was Chris Horner; he finished the stage, but did not start stage eight due to concussion, a nasal fracture and a hematoma to his calf. The eighth stage was the first at altitude, and saw the breakaway's only survivor, Rui Costa (Movistar Team), win atop Super Besse, with a twelve-second margin. Gilbert led the points classification and Tejay van Garderen (BMC Racing Team) the mountains classification. In the ninth stage, there was controversy when Nicki Sørensen of Saxo Bank–SunGard was struck by a motorbike carrying a photographer, and Hoogerland and Juan Antonio Flecha (Team Sky) were injured after an incident with a television car. Prior to the crash, both riders had formed a five-rider breakaway; the remaining three held on to finish in front of the chasing peloton. Luis León Sánchez (Rabobank) won the stage, with second-placed Thomas Voeckler (Team Europcar) gaining the overall race lead. Jurgen Van den Broeck, a general classification contender, left the race due to a clavicle fracture caused by a crash. Hoogerland took back the polka. The next day was the first rest day of the Tour. Stages ten and eleven ended with a bunch sprints, with the victors André Greipel and Cavendish, respectively. The latter took the lead of the points classification.

=== Pyrenees and transition ===
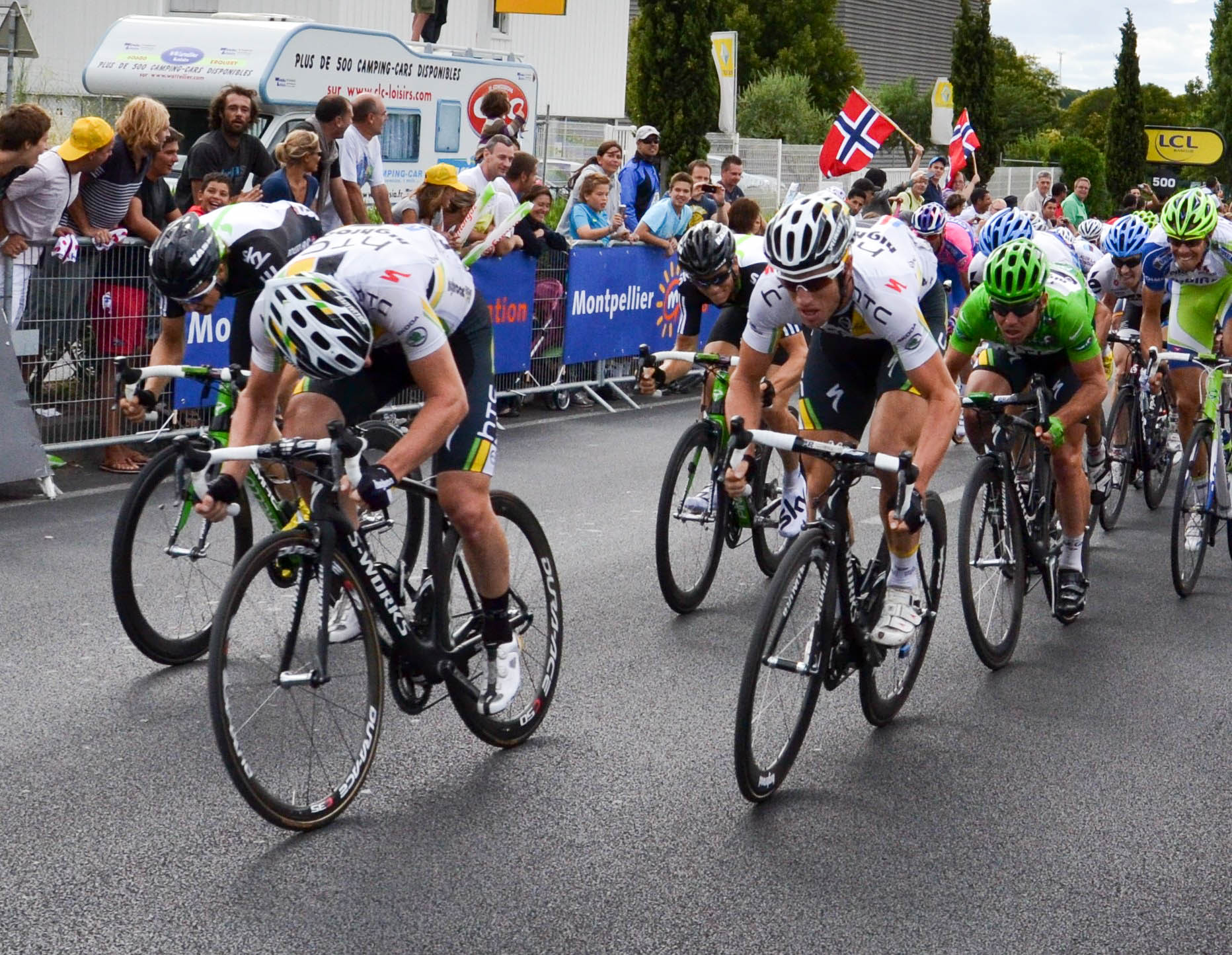
The renowned sprint train of the HTC–Highroad team setting up Mark Cavendish (green jersey) to take victory in stage 11's bunch sprint finish, the third of Cavendish's five stage wins

Stage twelve was the first to enter the high mountains, and included two climbs that were rated hors catégorie, the La Hourquette d'Ancizan and the climb to the finish at Luz Ardiden. An early breakaway of six riders were caught and passed in the final 8 km (5 mi) by Jelle Vanendert (Omega Pharma–Lotto) and Samuel Sánchez). They held off the chasing group that included the main general classification contenders and a late attack by Fränk Schleck, with Samuel Sánchez crossing the finish line first. Of the general classification favourites, Contador lost the most time in the stage, 33 seconds down on third-placed Fränk Schleck (the highest placed overall contender). The mountains classification points Samuel Sánchez received at the summit finish put him in the polka dot jersey. In the thirteenth stage, a three-rider breakaway went clear over the hors catégorie-rated Col d'Aubisque, and after the long descent to Lourdes, they finished with a margin of five minutes; Hushovd took the stage win. Jérémy Roy (FDJ), who was one of the three, took the polka. The fourteenth stage was last in the Pyrenees and it included six categorised climbs. As the race reached the hors catégorie climb to Plateau de Beille and the finish, the main group of overall favourites took control, and with 6 km (4 mi) to go, Vanendert attacked and won with a margin of 21 seconds. His win put Vanendert in the polka.

The transitional stage fifteen that moved the race east to the Alps was won by Cavendish from a bunch sprint. The next day was the second rest day. Hushovd won his second stage of the Tour with the sixteenth; he formed part of the three-rider breakaway that escaped with 60 km (37 mi) to go. On the descent of the final climb – the Col de Manse – Evans attacked and at the finish had gained time on his rivals, displacing Fränk Schleck and moving up one place to second overall.

=== Alps and finale ===
Another descent to the finish followed in stage sixteen, and again the winner came from a breakaway. Boasson Hagen was the victor, improving on his second place the previous day. Overall race leader Voeckler lost 27 seconds to his rivals after he went wide on two of the final descent's corners. The Tour's queen stage, the eighteenth, included three hors catégorie climbs, including the Col du Galibier summit finish. With 60 km (37 mi) to go, Andy Schleck launched a solo attack on the second climb, the Col d'Izoard. He went on to bridge across and pass a large breakaway, before claiming the stage win; he moved up to second overall, gaining over two minutes on his rivals. Voeckler's lead in the yellow jersey was reduced to fifteen seconds. The autobus (the large group behind the leading peloton) of 88 riders finished outside the time limit, 35 min 50 s after Schleck; all riders were allowed to stay in the race due to the large number. The points classification leader, Cavendish, who was in the group, was docked 20 points.

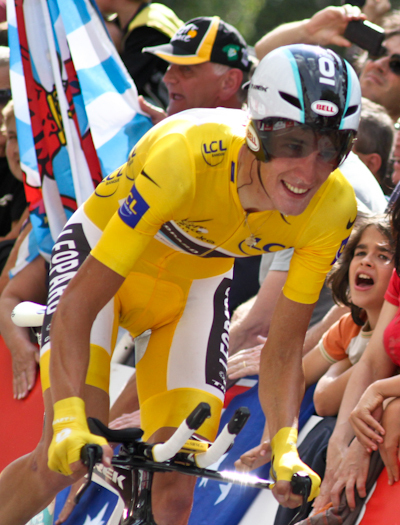
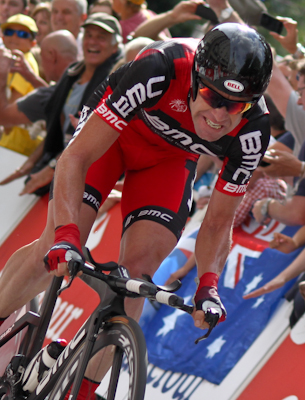
Andy Schleck (left) led the general classification going into the penultimate stage's individual time trial, but Cadel Evans's (right) performance in the stage moved him from third position to first.

The race for the general classification began from the start of the nineteenth stage, the Tour's final mountain stage, with Voeckler, the Schleck brothers and Evans all in a second breakaway. Andy Schleck was then part of a group that crossed the second of the stage's three large climbs, the Galibier, in pursuit of the leading group. The head of the race came together on the long descent to foot of the climb and the finish at Alpe d'Huez, with the exception of Ryder Hesjedal (Garmin–Cervélo) and Pierre Rolland (Team Europcar), who had a 47-second lead. The latter won the stage, counter-attacking a solo move by Contador. Voeckler lost the lead of the general classification, dropping to fourth overall, behind the Schleck brothers and Evans, who all came in with an elite group a minute after the winner. The top three positions of the general classification were Andy Schleck, Fränk Schleck (53 seconds down) and Evans (57 seconds down). Samuel Sánchez, second in the stage, took the lead of the mountains classification. The penultimate stage, the 42.5 km (26 mi) individual time trial in Grenoble, was decisive in the outcome of the general classification, with Evans placing second and beating Andy Schleck by two and a half minutes to lead the Tour. Tony Martin of HTC–Highroad won the stage, seven seconds ahead of Evans.

In the final stage, Cavendish secured a record third successive victory on the Champs-Élysées in Paris, his fifth stage win of the 2011 Tour. Evans finished the race to become the first Australian rider to win the Tour de France, and at 34, the oldest post-World War II winner. The Schleck brothers placed second and third, Andy 1 min 34 s down and Fränk 2 min 30 s down. Cavendish won the points classification with a total of 334, 62 ahead of Rojas in second, becoming the first British rider to claim the green jersey. The mountains classification was won by Samuel Sánchez, who had a win and two second places on the four mountain-top finishes. Andy Schleck finished second in that category, with Vanendert third. Rolland, tenth in the general classification, won the young rider classification, largely by virtue of positions he attained in supporting his team leader, Voeckler, during the time he held the yellow jersey. Garmin–Cervélo finished as the winners of the team classification, eleven minutes ahead of second-placed Leopard Trek. Of the 198 starters, 169 reached the finish of the last stage in Paris.

=== Doping ===
During the Tour's first rest day, it was announced that Alexandr Kolobnev's (Team Katusha) urine sample taken after the fifth stage had tested positive for the diuretic medication hydrochlorothiazide. Although it was listed by the World Anti-Doping Agency as prohibited, cycling's governing body, Union Cycliste Internationale (UCI), only released a statement advising his team "take the necessary steps to enable the Tour de France to continue in serenity...". He withdrew from the race immediately. On 1 March 2012, CAS decided that Kolobnev would only receive a warning for this, and no suspension, because his use of the drug was justified by 'medical reasons unrelated to performance'.

On 6 February 2012, CAS removed Alberto Contador's results due to his positive test for clenbuterol at the 2010 Tour. The UCI subsequently revised the final general classification, with riders ranked between 6 and 21 upgraded, and the 21st position left unattributed. On 18 October 2012, the UCI announced that a disciplinary procedure against Carlos Barredo (Rabobank) was taken following anomalies in his biological passport. He retired from cycling in December 2012. In July 2014, his results were disqualified from races in which he participated between 26 October 2007 and 24 September 2011, with his 35th position on the 2011 Tour's general classification left vacant.

== Classification leadership and minor prizes ==
There were four main individual classifications contested in the 2011 Tour de France, as well as a team competition. The most important was the general classification, which was calculated by adding each rider's finishing times on each stage. There were no time bonuses given at the end of stages for this edition of the Tour. If a crash had happened within the final 3 km (1.9 mi) of a stage, not including time trials and summit finishes, the riders involved would have received the same time as the group they were in when the crash occurred. The rider with the lowest cumulative time was the winner of the general classification and was considered the overall winner of the Tour. The rider leading the classification wore a yellow jersey.

Points classification points for the top 15 positions by type
Type	1	2	3	4	5	6	7	8	9	10	11	12	13	14	15
Flat stage	45	35	30	26	22	20	18	16	14	12	10	8	6	4	2
Medium mountain stage	30	25	22	19	17	15	13	11	9	7	6	5	4	3	2
High mountain stage	20	17	15	13	11	10	9	8	7	6	5	4	3	2	1
Individual time trial	20	17	15	13	11	10	9	8	7	6	5	4	3	2	1
Intermediate sprint	20	17	15	13	11	10	9	8	7	6	5	4	3	2	1

The second classification was the points classification. Riders received points for finishing among the highest placed in a stage finish, or in intermediate sprints during the stage. The points available for each stage finish were determined by the stage's type. In the 2010 Tour, stages classified flat had three intermediate sprint points worth 6, 4, and 2 points to the first three riders across the line. For 2011, flat stages had just one intermediate sprint which was worth 20 points to the rider in first position, and the first 15 score points. The intention was to have riders needing to sprint twice during the day to score well. Points awarded at the finish of flat stages also increased, from 35 points for the winner to 45. Medium mountain stages awarded 30 points to the winner, high mountain stages and the individual time trial gave 20 points. No points were awarded for the team time trial on stage two. The leader was identified by a green jersey.

The third classification was the mountains classification. Points were awarded to the riders that reached the summit of the most difficult climbs first. The climbs were categorised as fourth-, third-, second-, first-category and hors catégorie, with the more difficult climbs rated lower. In the 2010 Tour, any hors catégorie, first-, or second-category climb awarded double points if it was the last of the stage. In 2011, only the summit stage finishes awarded double points, specifically stages 12, 14, 18 and 19. Pre-race analysis speculated that the winner would be more likely, under this system, to be a general classification contender than in years past. This speculation proved accurate, as Samuel Sánchez, who finished sixth in the general classification, won the mountains classification, and the top three finishers in the general classification were in the top five of the mountains classification. The leader wore a white jersey with red polka dots.

The final individual classification was the young rider classification. This was calculated the same way as the general classification, but the classification was restricted to riders who were born on or after 1 January 1986. The leader wore a white jersey.

The final classification was a team classification. This was calculated using the finishing times of the best three riders per team on each stage, excluding the team time trial; the leading team was the team with the lowest cumulative time. The number of stage victories and placings per team determined the outcome of a tie. The riders in the team that lead this classification were identified with yellow number bibs on the back of their jerseys.

In addition, there was a combativity award given after each stage to the rider considered, by a jury, to have "made the greatest effort and who has demonstrated the best qualities of sportsmanship". No combativity awards were given for the time trials and the final stage. The winner wore a red number bib the following stage. At the conclusion of the Tour, Jérémy Roy won the overall super-combativity award, again, decided by a jury.

A total of €3,412,546 was awarded in cash prizes in the race. The overall winner of the general classification received €450,000, with the second and third placed riders got €200,000 and €100,000 respectively. All finishers of the race were awarded with money. The holders of the classifications benefited on each stage they led; the final winners of the points and mountains were given €25,000, while the best young rider and most combative rider got €20,000. Team prizes were available, with €10,000 for the winner of team time trial and €50,000 for the winners of the team classification. There were also two special awards each with a prize of €5000, the Souvenir Henri Desgrange, given in honour of Tour founder Henri Desgrange to the first rider to pass the summit of the Col du Galibier in stage eighteen, and the Souvenir Jacques Goddet, given to the first rider to pass Goddet's memorial at the summit of the Col du Tourmalet in stage twelve. Andy Schleck won the Henri Desgrange and Roy won the Jacques Goddet.

Classification leadership by stage
Stage	Winner	General classification	Points classification	Mountains classification	Young rider classification	Team classification	Combativity award
1	Philippe Gilbert	Philippe Gilbert	Philippe Gilbert	Philippe Gilbert	Geraint Thomas	Omega Pharma–Lotto	Perrig Quéméneur
2	Garmin–Cervélo	Thor Hushovd	Philippe Gilbert	Philippe Gilbert	Geraint Thomas	Garmin–Cervélo	no award
3	Tyler Farrar	Thor Hushovd	José Joaquín Rojas	Philippe Gilbert	Geraint Thomas	Garmin–Cervélo	Mickaël Delage
4	Cadel Evans	Thor Hushovd	José Joaquín Rojas	Cadel Evans	Geraint Thomas	Garmin–Cervélo	Jérémy Roy
5	Mark Cavendish	Thor Hushovd	Philippe Gilbert	Cadel Evans	Geraint Thomas	Garmin–Cervélo	Iván Gutiérrez
6	Edvald Boasson Hagen	Thor Hushovd	Philippe Gilbert	Johnny Hoogerland	Geraint Thomas	Garmin–Cervélo	Adriano Malori
7	Mark Cavendish	Thor Hushovd	José Joaquín Rojas	Johnny Hoogerland	Robert Gesink	Garmin–Cervélo	Yannick Talabardon
8	Rui Costa	Thor Hushovd	Philippe Gilbert	Tejay van Garderen	Robert Gesink	Garmin–Cervélo	Tejay van Garderen
9	Luis León Sánchez	Thomas Voeckler	Philippe Gilbert	Johnny Hoogerland	Robert Gesink	Team Europcar	Flecha and Hoogerland
10	André Greipel	Thomas Voeckler	Philippe Gilbert	Johnny Hoogerland	Robert Gesink	Team Europcar	Marco Marcato
11	Mark Cavendish	Thomas Voeckler	Mark Cavendish	Johnny Hoogerland	Robert Gesink	Team Europcar	Mickaël Delage
12	Samuel Sánchez	Thomas Voeckler	Mark Cavendish	Samuel Sánchez	Arnold Jeannesson	Leopard Trek	Geraint Thomas
13	Thor Hushovd	Thomas Voeckler	Mark Cavendish	Jérémy Roy	Arnold Jeannesson	Garmin–Cervélo	Jérémy Roy
14	Jelle Vanendert	Thomas Voeckler	Mark Cavendish	Jelle Vanendert	Rigoberto Urán	Leopard Trek	Sandy Casar
15	Mark Cavendish	Thomas Voeckler	Mark Cavendish	Jelle Vanendert	Rigoberto Urán	Leopard Trek	Niki Terpstra
16	Thor Hushovd	Thomas Voeckler	Mark Cavendish	Jelle Vanendert	Rigoberto Urán	Garmin–Cervélo	Mikhail Ignatiev
17	Edvald Boasson Hagen	Thomas Voeckler	Mark Cavendish	Jelle Vanendert	Rigoberto Urán	Garmin–Cervélo	Rubén Pérez
18	Andy Schleck	Thomas Voeckler	Mark Cavendish	Jelle Vanendert	Rein Taaramäe	Garmin–Cervélo	Andy Schleck
19	Pierre Rolland	Andy Schleck	Mark Cavendish	Samuel Sánchez	Pierre Rolland	Garmin–Cervélo	Alberto Contador
20	Tony Martin	Cadel Evans	Mark Cavendish	Samuel Sánchez	Pierre Rolland	Garmin–Cervélo	no award
21	Mark Cavendish	Cadel Evans	Mark Cavendish	Samuel Sánchez	Pierre Rolland	Garmin–Cervélo	no award
Final		Cadel Evans	Mark Cavendish	Samuel Sánchez	Pierre Rolland	Garmin–Cervélo	Jérémy Roy

- In stage two, Cadel Evans, who was second in the points classification, wore the green jersey, as Philippe Gilbert held the general classification as well as the points classification and the mountains classification. Thor Hushovd, who was third in both the general and points classifications, wore the polka dot jersey.
- In stage three, as Philippe Gilbert held the points classification as well as the mountains classification, Cadel Evans, who was second on the only climb yielding points to that stage, wore the polka dot jersey.
- After stage nine, both Juan Antonio Flecha and Johnny Hoogerland were awarded the red number bib for stage ten. They received the combativity award after stage nine for finishing the stage despite a collision with a television car. Flecha refused to accept the award on the podium after the stage; Hoogerland, having already been up there to receive the polka dot jersey, did take the award.

== Final standings ==
Legend
A yellow jersey.	Denotes the winner of the general classification	A green jersey.	Denotes the winner of the points classification
A white jersey with red polka dots.	Denotes the winner of the mountains classification	A white jersey.	Denotes the winner of the young rider classification
A white jersey with a yellow number bib.	Denotes the winner of the team classification	A white jersey with a red number bib.	Denotes the winner of the super-combativity award

=== General classification ===
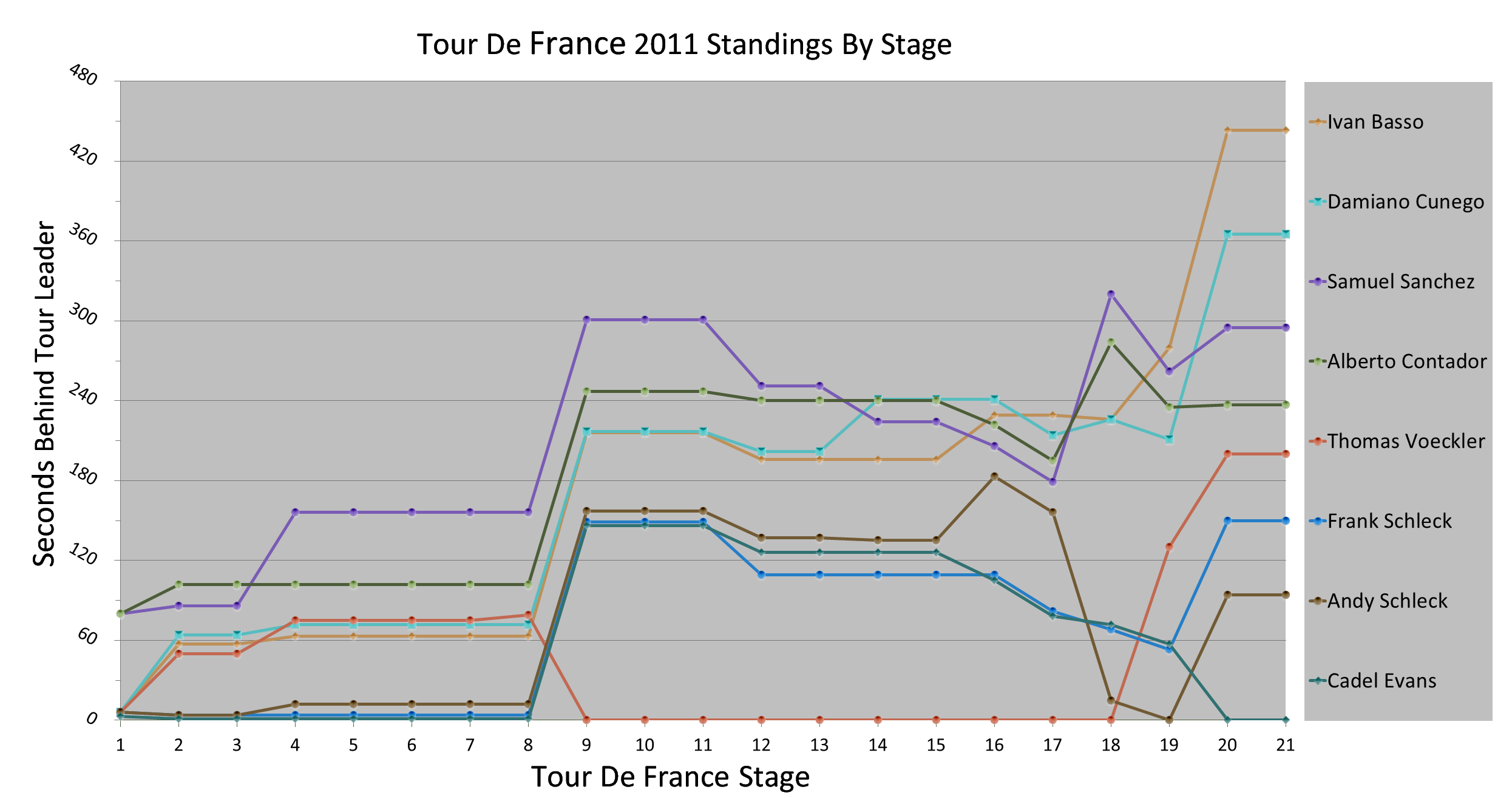
A graph of the prominent riders and their position relative to the leader of the general classification up to the penultimate stage

Final general classification (1–10)
Rank	Rider	Team	Time
1	Cadel Evans (AUS)	BMC Racing Team	86h 12′ 22″
2	Andy Schleck (LUX)	Leopard Trek	+ 1′ 34″
3	Fränk Schleck (LUX)	Leopard Trek	+ 2′ 30″
4	Thomas Voeckler (FRA)	Team Europcar	+ 3′ 20″
DSQ	~~Alberto Contador (ESP)~~ (Note: On 6 February 2012, the Court of Arbitration for Sport removed Alberto Contador's results from the 2011 Tour for testing positive for clenbuterol in 2010. Contador had originally finished in fifth place, 3' 57" in arrears to Evans. Subsequently, riders ranked between 6 and 21 in the general classification were upgraded by cycling's governing body, Union Cycliste Internationale, with the 21st then left unattributed. In the points classification, Contador was tenth with 105 points, and in the mountains classification Contador was sixth with 51 points.)	~~Saxo Bank–SunGard~~	~~+ 3′ 57″~~
5	Samuel Sánchez (ESP)	Euskaltel–Euskadi	+ 4′ 55″
6	Damiano Cunego (ITA)	Lampre–ISD	+ 6′ 05″
7	Ivan Basso (ITA)	Liquigas–Cannondale	+ 7′ 23″
8	Tom Danielson (USA)	Garmin–Cervélo	+ 8′ 15″
9	Jean-Christophe Péraud (FRA)	Ag2r–La Mondiale	+ 10′ 11″
10	Pierre Rolland (FRA)	Team Europcar	+ 10′ 43″

Final general classification (11–169)
Rank	Rider	Team	Time
11	Rein Taaramäe (EST)	Cofidis	+ 11' 29"
12	Kevin De Weert (BEL)	Quick-Step	+ 16' 29"
13	Jérôme Coppel (FRA)	Saur–Sojasun	+ 18' 36"
14	Arnold Jeannesson (FRA)	FDJ	+ 21' 20"
15	Haimar Zubeldia (ESP)	Team RadioShack	+ 26' 23"
16	Christian Vande Velde (USA)	Garmin–Cervélo	+ 27' 12"
17	Ryder Hesjedal (CAN)	Garmin–Cervélo	+ 27' 14"
18	Peter Velits (SVK)	HTC–Highroad	+ 28' 54"
19	Jelle Vanendert (BEL)	Omega Pharma–Lotto	+ 32' 41"
20	Rob Ruijgh (NED)	Vacansoleil–DCM	+ 33' 04"
21	not attributed		
22	Hubert Dupont (FRA)	Ag2r–La Mondiale	+ 36' 54"
23	Vladimir Gusev (RUS)	Team Katusha	+ 42' 26"
24	Rigoberto Urán (COL)	Team Sky	+ 42' 48"
25	Gorka Verdugo (ESP)	Euskaltel–Euskadi	+ 43' 06"
26	Nicolas Roche (IRL)	Ag2r–La Mondiale	+ 46' 23"
27	Sandy Casar (FRA)	FDJ	+ 50' 28"
28	Vladimir Karpets (RUS)	Team Katusha	+ 52' 25"
29	Maxime Monfort (BEL)	Leopard Trek	+ 53' 16"
30	Yuri Trofimov (RUS)	Team Katusha	+ 56' 46"
31	Geraint Thomas (GBR)	Team Sky	+ 1h 00' 48"
32	Levi Leipheimer (USA)	Team RadioShack	+ 1h 03' 58"
33	Robert Gesink (NED)	Rabobank	+ 1h 05' 09"
34	Egoi Martínez (ESP)	Euskaltel–Euskadi	+ 1h 08' 28"
DSQ	~~Carlos Barredo (ESP)~~	~~Rabobank~~	~~+ 1h 12' 58"~~
36	David Arroyo (ESP)	Movistar Team	+ 1h 14' 40"
37	Chris Anker Sørensen (DEN)	Saxo Bank–SunGard	+ 1h 14' 42"
38	Philippe Gilbert (BEL)	Omega Pharma–Lotto	+ 1h 14' 51"
39	Rémy Di Gregorio (FRA)	Astana	+ 1h 22' 04"
40	Julien El Fares (FRA)	Cofidis	+ 1h 24' 21"
41	David Moncoutié (FRA)	Cofidis	+ 1h 25' 25"
42	Sylwester Szmyd (POL)	Liquigas–Cannondale	+ 1h 25' 37"
43	Cyril Gautier (FRA)	Team Europcar	+ 1h 27' 43"
44	Tony Martin (GER)	HTC–Highroad	+ 1h 30' 56"
45	Andrey Zeits (KAZ)	Astana	+ 1h 31' 48"
46	Dries Devenyns (BEL)	Quick-Step	+ 1h 34' 06"
47	Yannick Talabardon (FRA)	Saur–Sojasun	+ 1h 34' 51"
48	Xabier Zandio (ESP)	Team Sky	+ 1h 35' 18"
49	Steve Morabito (SUI)	BMC Racing Team	+ 1h 37' 57"
50	Jakob Fuglsang (DEN)	Leopard Trek	+ 1h 39' 58"
51	Christophe Riblon (FRA)	Ag2r–La Mondiale	+ 1h 43' 47"
52	Anthony Charteau (FRA)	Team Europcar	+ 1h 43' 49"
53	Edvald Boasson Hagen (NOR)	Team Sky	+ 1h 44' 39"
54	Jérôme Pineau (FRA)	Quick-Step	+ 1h 44' 41"
55	Maxime Bouet (FRA)	Ag2r–La Mondiale	+ 1h 44' 45"
56	George Hincapie (USA)	BMC Racing Team	+ 1h 45' 16"
57	Luis León Sánchez (ESP)	Rabobank	+ 1h 46' 09"
58	Laurens ten Dam (NED)	Rabobank	+ 1h 47' 02"
59	David Loosli (SUI)	Lampre–ISD	+ 1h 51' 08"
60	Linus Gerdemann (GER)	Leopard Trek	+ 1h 51' 19"
61	Sylvain Chavanel (FRA)	Quick-Step	+ 1h 52' 21"
62	Daniel Navarro (ESP)	Saxo Bank–SunGard	+ 1h 53' 22"
63	Thomas De Gendt (BEL)	Vacansoleil–DCM	+ 1h 54' 11"
64	Christian Knees (GER)	Team Sky	+ 1h 56' 12"
65	Amaël Moinard (FRA)	BMC Racing Team	+ 1h 58' 43"
66	Gorka Izagirre (ESP)	Euskaltel–Euskadi	+ 1h 59' 47"
67	Jens Voigt (GER)	Leopard Trek	+ 1h 59' 56"
68	Thor Hushovd (NOR)	Garmin–Cervélo	+ 2h 03' 15"
69	Maciej Paterski (POL)	Liquigas–Cannondale	+ 2h 03' 56"
70	Bauke Mollema (NED)	Rabobank	+ 2h 06' 35"
71	Grischa Niermann (GER)	Rabobank	+ 2h 07' 26"
72	Richie Porte (AUS)	Saxo Bank–SunGard	+ 2h 09' 24"
73	Egor Silin (RUS)	Team Katusha	+ 2h 10' 05"
74	Johnny Hoogerland (NED)	Vacansoleil–DCM	+ 2h 11' 51"
75	Rubén Pérez (ESP)	Euskaltel–Euskadi	+ 2h 12' 28"
76	David Millar (GBR)	Garmin–Cervélo	+ 2h 14' 56"
77	Gianni Meersman (BEL)	FDJ	+ 2h 17' 27"
78	Stuart O'Grady (AUS)	Leopard Trek	+ 2h 17' 58"
79	Tony Gallopin (FRA)	Cofidis	+ 2h 18' 19"
80	José Joaquín Rojas (ESP)	Movistar Team	+ 2h 22' 54"
81	Sérgio Paulinho (POR)	Team RadioShack	+ 2h 24' 29"
82	Tejay van Garderen (USA)	HTC–Highroad	+ 2h 25' 49"
83	Ivan Santaromita (ITA)	BMC Racing Team	+ 2h 27' 12"
84	Markel Irizar (ESP)	Team RadioShack	+ 2h 27' 13"
85	Jürgen Roelandts (BEL)	Omega Pharma–Lotto	+ 2h 27' 28"
86	Jérémy Roy (FRA)	FDJ	+ 2h 28' 27"
87	Kristijan Koren (SVN)	Liquigas–Cannondale	+ 2h 29' 24"
88	Imanol Erviti (ESP)	Movistar Team	+ 2h 29' 47"
89	Marco Marcato (ITA)	Vacansoleil–DCM	+ 2h 30' 09"
90	Rui Costa (POR)	Movistar Team	+ 2h 31' 34"
91	Adriano Malori (ITA)	Lampre–ISD	+ 2h 31' 47"
92	Jesús Hernández (ESP)	Saxo Bank–SunGard	+ 2h 32' 00"
93	Matteo Bono (ITA)	Lampre–ISD	+ 2h 35' 45"
94	Alan Pérez (ESP)	Euskaltel–Euskadi	+ 2h 36' 14"
95	Nicki Sørensen (DEN)	Saxo Bank–SunGard	+ 2h 36' 26"
96	Simon Gerrans (AUS)	Team Sky	+ 2h 37' 25"
97	Jonathan Hivert (FRA)	Saur–Sojasun	+ 2h 37' 37"
98	Juan Antonio Flecha (ESP)	Team Sky	+ 2h 41' 04"
99	Maarten Tjallingii (NED)	Rabobank	+ 2h 41' 41"
100	Daniel Oss (ITA)	Liquigas–Cannondale	+ 2h 47' 07"
101	Anthony Roux (FRA)	FDJ	+ 2h 47' 49"
102	Iván Gutiérrez (ESP)	Movistar Team	+ 2h 49' 23"
103	Michael Schär (SUI)	BMC Racing Team	+ 2h 49' 37"
104	Arthur Vichot (FRA)	FDJ	+ 2h 49' 49"
105	Maxim Iglinsky (KAZ)	Astana	+ 2h 53' 50"
106	Dmitry Fofonov (KAZ)	Astana	+ 2h 53' 59"
107	Alessandro Petacchi (ITA)	Lampre–ISD	+ 2h 54' 20"
108	Joost Posthuma (NED)	Leopard Trek	+ 2h 55' 25"
109	Danilo Hondo (GER)	Lampre–ISD	+ 3h 00' 00"
110	Sébastien Minard (FRA)	Ag2r–La Mondiale	+ 3h 00' 04"
111	Sébastien Hinault (FRA)	Ag2r–La Mondiale	+ 3h 00' 44"
112	Roman Kreuziger (CZE)	Astana	+ 3h 00' 59"
113	Sebastian Lang (GER)	Omega Pharma–Lotto	+ 3h 01' 51"
114	Brent Bookwalter (USA)	BMC Racing Team	+ 3h 03' 47"
115	Manuel Quinziato (ITA)	BMC Racing Team	+ 3h 04' 47"
116	Benjamín Noval (ESP)	Saxo Bank–SunGard	+ 3h 06' 29"
117	Blel Kadri (FRA)	Ag2r–La Mondiale	+ 3h 07' 07"
118	Tristan Valentin (FRA)	Cofidis	+ 3h 07' 10"
119	Fabian Cancellara (SUI)	Leopard Trek	+ 3h 07' 31"
120	Sébastien Turgot (FRA)	Team Europcar	+ 3h 08' 34"
121	Leonardo Duque (COL)	Cofidis	+ 3h 08' 41"
122	Laurent Mangel (FRA)	Saur–Sojasun	+ 3h 10' 19"
123	Matteo Tosatto (ITA)	Saxo Bank–SunGard	+ 3h 10' 36"
124	Fabrice Jeandesboz (FRA)	Saur–Sojasun	+ 3h 11' 47"
125	Brian Vandborg (DEN)	Saxo Bank–SunGard	+ 3h 13' 43"
126	Paolo Longo Borghini (ITA)	Liquigas–Cannondale	+ 3h 13' 44"
127	Grega Bole (SVN)	Lampre–ISD	+ 3h 14' 15"
128	Lieuwe Westra (NED)	Vacansoleil–DCM	+ 3h 14' 15"
129	Dimitry Muravyev (KAZ)	Team RadioShack	+ 3h 14' 29"
130	Mark Cavendish (GBR)	HTC–Highroad	+ 3h 15' 05"
131	Mickaël Buffaz (FRA)	Cofidis	+ 3h 15' 12"
132	Mickaël Delage (FRA)	FDJ	+ 3h 15' 39"
133	Alessandro Vanotti (ITA)	Liquigas–Cannondale	+ 3h 16' 00"
134	Niki Terpstra (NED)	Quick-Step	+ 3h 16' 38"
135	Anthony Delaplace (FRA)	Saur–Sojasun	+ 3h 16' 58"
136	Borut Božič (SVN)	Vacansoleil–DCM	+ 3h 17' 11"
137	Ben Swift (GBR)	Team Sky	+ 3h 18' 07"
138	Jérémie Galland (FRA)	Saur–Sojasun	+ 3h 19' 46"
139	Francisco Ventoso (ESP)	Movistar Team	+ 3h 20' 02"
140	Tomas Vaitkus (LTU)	Astana	+ 3h 20' 07"
141	Marcel Sieberg (GER)	Omega Pharma–Lotto	+ 3h 21' 39"
142	Matthew Goss (AUS)	HTC–Highroad	+ 3h 22' 32"
143	Maciej Bodnar (POL)	Liquigas–Cannondale	+ 3h 23' 30"
144	Andriy Hrivko (UKR)	Astana	+ 3h 26' 22"
145	Julian Dean (NZL)	Garmin–Cervélo	+ 3h 28' 00"
146	Addy Engels (NED)	Quick-Step	+ 3h 29' 04"
147	Mikhail Ignatiev (RUS)	Team Katusha	+ 3h 29' 07"
148	Arnaud Coyot (FRA)	Saur–Sojasun	+ 3h 29' 20"
149	Pablo Urtasun (ESP)	Euskaltel–Euskadi	+ 3h 30' 17"
150	Gerald Ciolek (GER)	Quick-Step	+ 3h 30' 22"
151	Perrig Quéméneur (FRA)	Team Europcar	+ 3h 30' 35"
152	Romain Zingle (BEL)	Cofidis	+ 3h 31' 30"
153	Denys Kostyuk (UKR)	Lampre–ISD	+ 3h 31' 42"
154	Lars Bak (DEN)	HTC–Highroad	+ 3h 33' 25"
155	Vincent Jérôme (FRA)	Team Europcar	+ 3h 34' 37"
156	André Greipel (GER)	Omega Pharma–Lotto	+ 3h 35' 04"
157	Ramūnas Navardauskas (LTU)	Garmin–Cervélo	+ 3h 36' 53"
158	Yohann Gène (FRA)	Team Europcar	+ 3h 38' 13"
159	Tyler Farrar (USA)	Garmin–Cervélo	+ 3h 38' 32"
160	Jimmy Engoulvent (FRA)	Saur–Sojasun	+ 3h 38' 34"
161	Bernhard Eisel (AUT)	HTC–Highroad	+ 3h 39' 56"
162	Samuel Dumoulin (FRA)	Cofidis	+ 3h 43' 17"
163	Mark Renshaw (AUS)	HTC–Highroad	+ 3h 44' 00"
164	Marcus Burghardt (GER)	BMC Racing Team	+ 3h 44' 08"
165	Danny Pate (USA)	HTC–Highroad	+ 3h 45' 26"
166	Andrey Amador (CRC)	Movistar Team	+ 3h 54' 35"
167	Fabio Sabatini (ITA)	Liquigas–Cannondale	+ 3h 57' 43"

=== Points classification ===
Final points classification (1–10)
Rank	Rider	Team	Points
1	Mark Cavendish (GBR)	HTC–Highroad	334
2	José Joaquín Rojas (ESP)	Movistar Team	272
3	Philippe Gilbert (BEL)	Omega Pharma–Lotto	236
4	Cadel Evans (AUS)	BMC Racing Team	208
5	Thor Hushovd (NOR)	Garmin–Cervélo	195
6	Edvald Boasson Hagen (NOR)	Team Sky	192
7	André Greipel (GER)	Omega Pharma–Lotto	160
8	Tyler Farrar (USA)	Garmin–Cervélo	127
9	Samuel Sánchez (ESP)	Euskaltel–Euskadi	105
DSQ	~~Alberto Contador (ESP)~~	~~Saxo Bank–SunGard~~	~~105~~
10	Jérémy Roy (FRA)	FDJ	104

=== Mountains classification ===
Final mountains classification (1–10)
Rank	Rider	Team	Points
1	Samuel Sánchez (ESP)	Euskaltel–Euskadi	108
2	Andy Schleck (LUX)	Leopard Trek	98
3	Jelle Vanendert (BEL)	Omega Pharma–Lotto	74
4	Cadel Evans (AUS)	BMC Racing Team	58
5	Fränk Schleck (LUX)	Leopard Trek	56
DSQ	~~Alberto Contador (ESP)~~	~~Saxo Bank–SunGard~~	~~51~~
6	Jérémy Roy (FRA)	FDJ	45
7	Pierre Rolland (FRA)	Team Europcar	44
8	Maxim Iglinsky (KAZ)	Astana	40
9	Johnny Hoogerland (NED)	Vacansoleil–DCM	40
10	Sylvain Chavanel (FRA)	Quick-Step	38

=== Young rider classification ===
Final young rider classification (1–10)
Rank	Rider	Team	Time
1	Pierre Rolland (FRA)	Team Europcar	86h 23′ 05″
2	Rein Taaramäe (EST)	Cofidis	+ 46″
3	Jérôme Coppel (FRA)	Saur–Sojasun	+ 7′ 53″
4	Arnold Jeannesson (FRA)	FDJ	+ 10′ 37″
5	Rob Ruijgh (NED)	Vacansoleil–DCM	+ 22′ 21″
6	Rigoberto Urán (COL)	Team Sky	+ 32′ 05″
7	Geraint Thomas (GBR)	Team Sky	+ 50′ 05″
8	Robert Gesink (NED)	Rabobank	+ 54′ 26″
9	Cyril Gautier (FRA)	Team Europcar	+ 1h 17′ 00″
10	Andrey Zeits (KAZ)	Astana	+ 1h 21′ 05″

=== Team classification ===
Final team classification (1–10)
Rank	Team	Time
1	(United States) Garmin–Cervélo	258h 18′ 49″
2	(Luxembourg) Leopard Trek	+ 11′ 04″
3	(France) Ag2r–La Mondiale	+ 11′ 20″
4	(France) Team Europcar	+ 41′ 53″
5	(Spain) Euskaltel–Euskadi	+ 52′ 00″
6	(United Kingdom) Team Sky	+ 58′ 24″
7	(Russia) Team Katusha	+ 1h 09′ 39″
8	(Denmark) Saxo Bank–SunGard	+ 1h 16′ 12″
9	(France) FDJ	+ 1h 30′ 16″
10	(France) Cofidis	+ 1h 47′ 29″

== UCI World Tour rankings ==
Riders from the ProTeams competing individually, as well as for their teams and nations, for points that contributed towards the World Tour rankings. Points were awarded to the top twenty finishers in the general classification and to the top five finishers in each stage. The 260 points accrued by Cadel Evans moved him from fourth position to second in the individual ranking. Leopard Trek took the lead of the team ranking, ahead of BMC Racing Team in second. Spain remained as leaders of the nation ranking, with Italy second.

UCI World Tour individual ranking on 25 July 2011 (1–10)
Rank	Prev.	Name	Team	Points
1	4	Cadel Evans (AUS)	BMC Racing Team	574
DSQ	~~2~~	~~Alberto Contador (ESP)~~	~~Saxo Bank–SunGard~~	~~471~~
3	1	Philippe Gilbert (BEL)	Omega Pharma–Lotto	402
4	3	Michele Scarponi (ITA)	Lampre–ISD	348
5	13	Samuel Sánchez (ESP)	Euskaltel–Euskadi	297
6	5	Joaquim Rodríguez (ESP)	Team Katusha	288
7	19	Fränk Schleck (LUX)	Leopard Trek	262
8	36	Andy Schleck (LUX)	Leopard Trek	252
9	6	Fabian Cancellara (SUI)	Leopard Trek	250
10	7	Alexander Vinokourov (KAZ)	Astana	230

== See also ==
- 2011 in men's road cycling
- 2011 in sports

== Bibliography ==
- Liggett, Phil; Raia, James; Lewis, Sammarye (2005). Tour de France for Dummies. For Dummies. Indianapolis: John Wiley & Sons. ISBN 978-0-7645-8449-7.
- "Race regulations" (PDF). Tour de France. Paris: Amaury Sport Organisation. 2011. Archived from the original (PDF) on 2 September 2011.
- UCI cycling regulations. Part 2, road races. Aigle, Switzerland: Union Cycliste Internationale. 1 February 2011. Archived from the original on 25 April 2011.
