= Mont des Alouettes =

Mountain in France

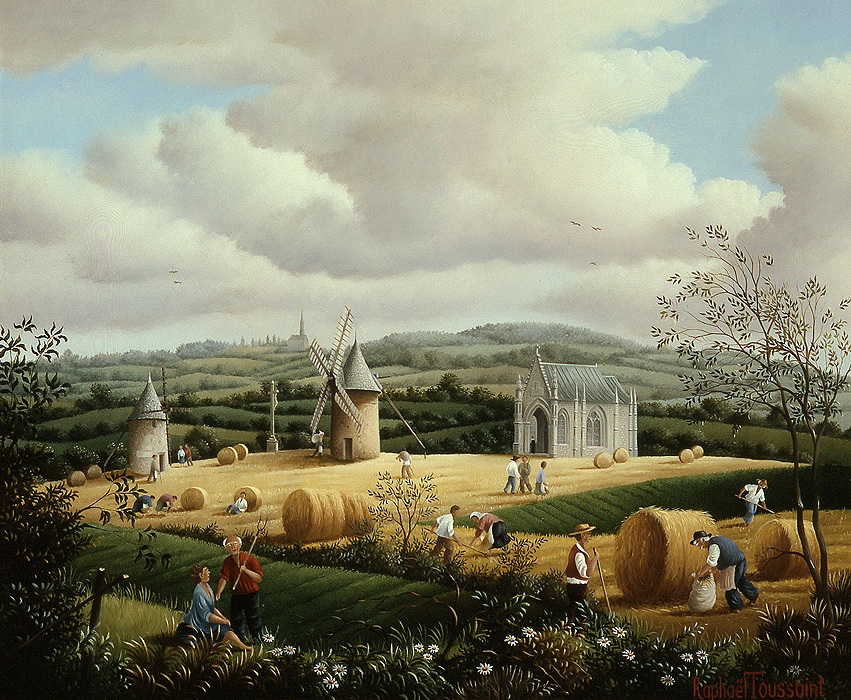
- Mont des Alouettes

Highest point
- Elevation: 232 m (761 ft)
- Coordinates: 46°53′41″N 1°00′37″W

Geography
- Location within France
- Location: Vendée, France

Mont des Alouettes is a hill near Les Herbiers in Vendée, France. In the 16th century, no less than seven windmills were built on this hill. Today there are three left, one of which is still running. During the war in the Vendée the movement of the opposing troops were measured from the wind mills. Mont des Alouettes is the finish of the first stage of the 2011 Tour de France.
