= Tristan Valentin =

French cyclist

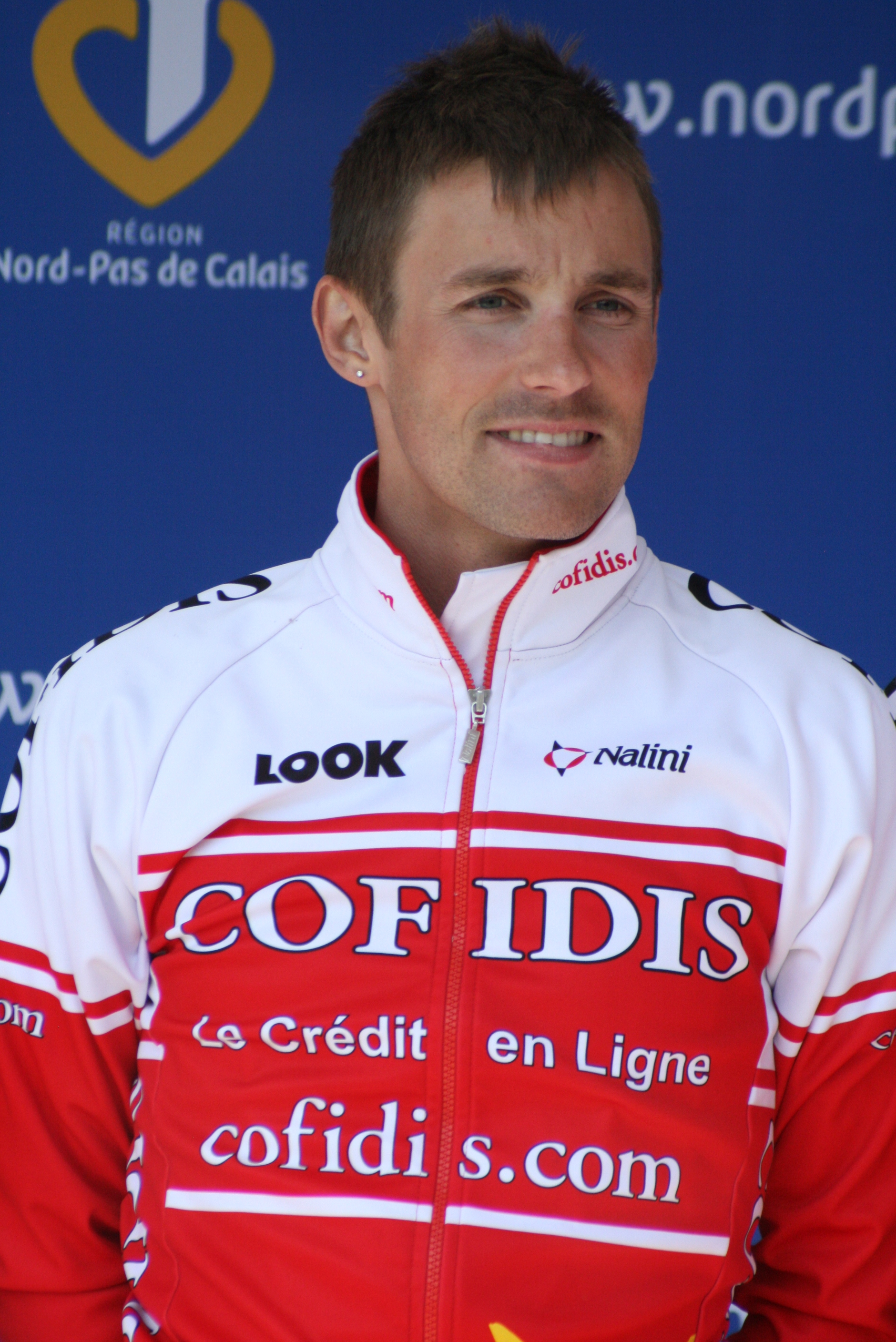

Personal information
- Full name: Tristan Valentin
- Born: 23 February 1982 (age 44) Le Blanc-Mesnil, France
- Height: 1.81 m (5 ft 11 in)
- Weight: 70 kg (154 lb)

Cycling career
- Sport: Cycling
- Discipline: Road
- Role: Rider

Amateur team
- 2002–2003: BigMat–Auber 93 (stagiaire)

Professional teams
- 2004–2005: Auber 93
- 2006–2013: Cofidis

Major wins
- Tro-Bro Léon (2005)

Tristan Valentin (born 23 February 1982 in Le Blanc-Mesnil, Seine-Saint-Denis) is a French professional road bicycle racer, who last rode for the Cofidis team.

== Doping ==
Valentin tested positive for Heptaminol on 6 June 2006. The UCI summary of 'Decisions on Anti-Doping Rule Violations made in 2006' states "disqualification and ineligibility for 6 months". However, the positive result was blamed on a medicine that the team doctor prescribed for varicose veins.

== Career achievements ==
=== Major results ===
2005
1st, Tro-Bro Léon
1st, Prix de la Ville de Nogent-sur-Oise
2006
3rd, Trophée des Grimpeurs
2013
7th Overall, World Ports Classic

=== Grand Tour general classification results timeline ===
Grand Tour	2007	2008	2009	2010	2011	2012	2013
Giro d'Italia	132	—	—	—	—	—	—
Tour de France	—	—	—	—	118	—	—
Vuelta a España	—	—	—	—	—	—	—

Legend
—	Did not compete
DNF	Did not finish

== See also ==
- List of doping cases in cycling
