= Australian cyclists at the Tour de France =

Australian cyclists have ridden in the Tour de France since 1914. In the 1980s, Phil Anderson became the first Australian cyclist to win a stage and wear the yellow jersey. Cadel Evans has been the only Australian cyclist to win the yellow jersey by winning the 2011 Tour de France.

== History ==
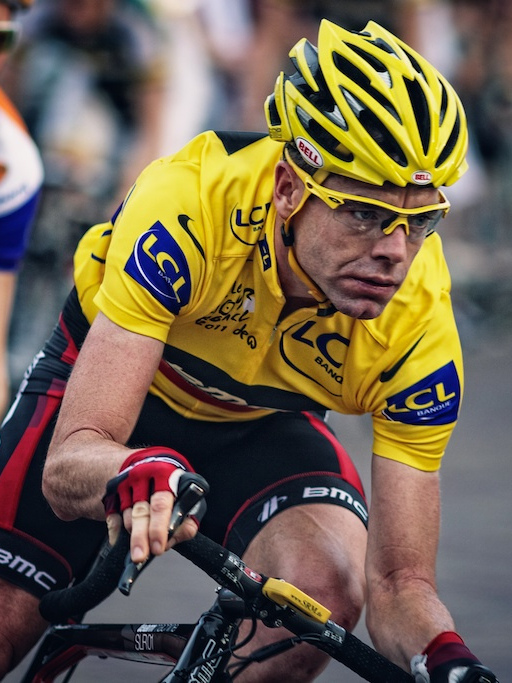
Evans wearing the yellow jersey during a Criterium in Surhuisterveen after the 2011 Tour de France

Australian cyclists have competed in the Tour de France since 1914 with Don Kirkham and Iddo Munro being the first representatives. Australian participation was sporadic until the 1980s. Two notable Australian riders before the 1980s were Hubert Opperman and Russell Mockridge, a gold medallist from the 1952 Olympic Games.

In the 1980s, Phil Anderson, Allan Peiper and Neil Stephens heralded Australian cyclists increased focus on the Tour. In 1991, the Australian Institute of Sport (AIS) established a road cycling program under Head Coach Heiko Salzwedel. This program lead to the development of many future Australian touring cyclists including Robbie McEwen, Patrick Jonker, Michael Rogers and Henk Vogels. In conjunction with the AIS road cycling team, the AIS track cycling program under the guidance of Charlie Walsh was developing endurance track riders including Stuart O'Grady, Bradley McGee and Brett Lancaster. Cadel Evans who won the Tour in 2011 was an AIS mountain bike scholarship holder in the lead up to the 2000 Sydney Olympics. By 2010, there were 11 Australian cyclists on the Tour. In 2011, Orica–GreenEDGE was launched with financial support from Australian Gerry Ryan and made their debut at the 2013 Tour de France. Cadel Evans became Australia's first and only winner of the Tour in 2011.

In November 2014, Cycling Australia announced its Tour de France Team of the Century to recognize Australia's first participation in the Tour. The team comprised nine riders: Cadel Evans and Phil Anderson (general classification), Richie Porte and Michael Rogers (domestiques), Robbie McEwen (sprinter), Bradley McGee and Mark Renshaw (sprint lead out riders), Simon Gerrans (all rounder) and Hubert Opperman (team captain).

Special Broadcasting Service has broadcast the Tour to Australian television viewers since 1991.

== Statistics ==
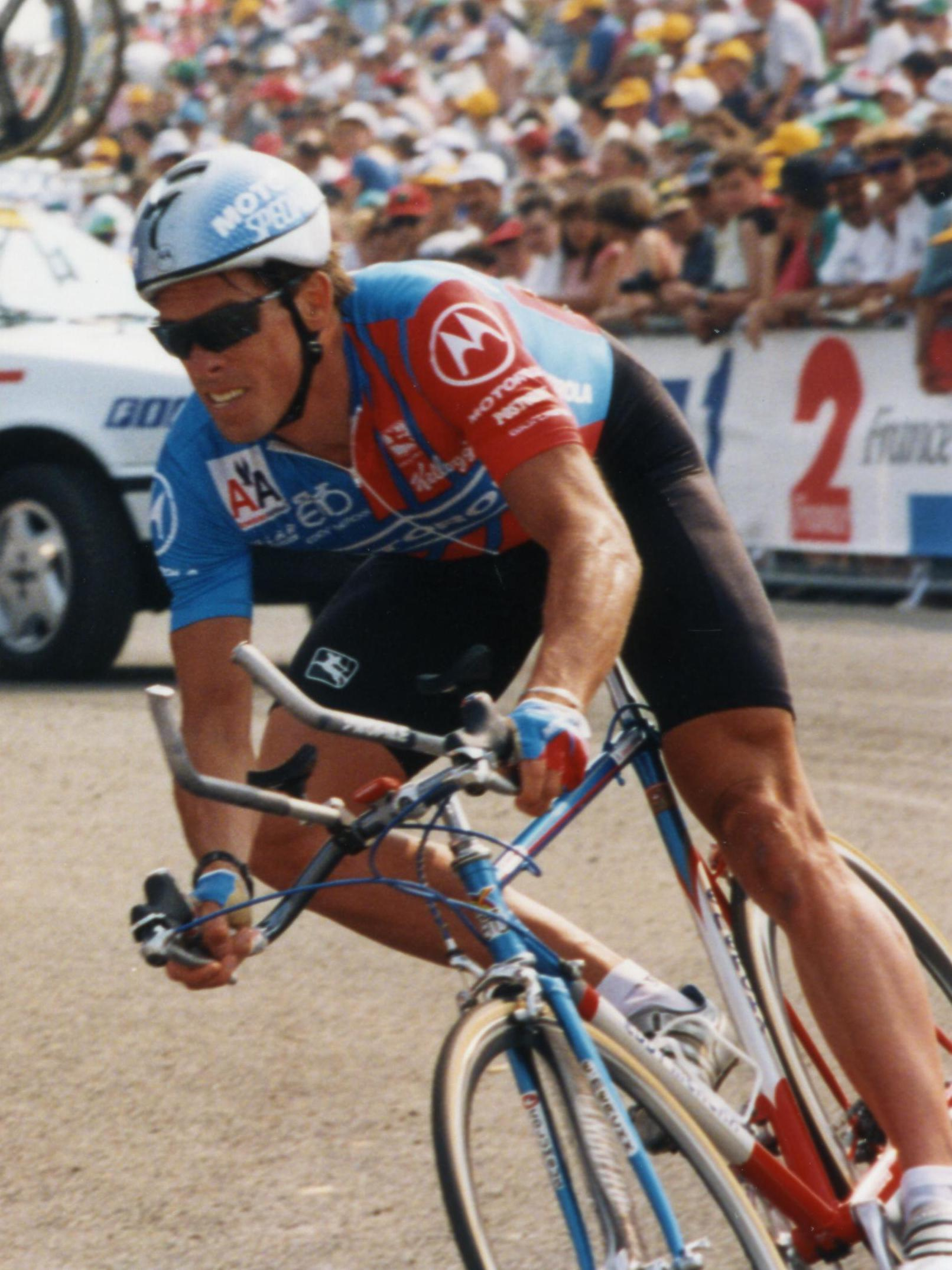
Anderson at the 1993 Tour de France

Overall statistics at start of 2026 Tour de France

- 75 Australian cyclists have ridden in the Tour from 1914 to 2025.
- Australia had 12 cyclists at the 2012 and 2023, followed by 11 cyclists at the 2013 Tour de France, 2018 Tour de France and 2026 Tour de France.
- Stuart O'Grady has ridden 17 Tours, followed by Phil Anderson with 13 tours
- Cadel Evans is the only Australian cyclist to win the Tour de France – 2011
- Cadel Evans & Richie Porte are only riders to finish tour on podium. Cadel did this 3 times (1st 2011 & 2nd 2007–08). Porte was 3rd in 2020.
- Phil Anderson was the first Australian stage winner and yellow jersey holder.
- eight Australian cyclists have worn the yellow jersey – Phil Anderson, Bradley McGee, Stuart O'Grady, Robbie McEwen, Cadel Evans, Simon Gerrans, Rohan Dennis and Jai Hindley
- three Australian cyclists have won the green jersey – Robbie McEwen, Baden Cooke and Michael Matthews
- six Australian cyclists have held the green jersey – Stuart O'Grady, Robbie McEwen, Bradley McGee, Baden Cooke, Rohan Dennis and Michael Matthews
- no Australian cyclist has won the polka dot jersey
- only one Australian cyclist has held the polka dot jersey – Cadel Evans
- only one Australian cyclist has won the white jersey – Phil Anderson
- two Australian cyclists have held the white jersey – Phil Anderson and Rohan Dennis
- two Australian cyclist has been the last placed finisher, known as the Lanterne rouge – Richard Lamb who wore the discontinued red jersey and Caleb Ewan.
- there have been 40 individual stage wins by 16 Australian cyclists (includes dual nationals) – Robbie McEwen – 12, Caleb Ewan – 5, Michael Matthews – 4, Stuart O'Grady – 2, Bradley McGee – 2, Phil Anderson – 2, Simon Gerrans – 2, Cadel Evans – 2, Ben O’Connor – 2, Michael Rogers – 1, Neil Stephens – 1, Rohan Dennis – 1, Baden Cooke – 1, Heinrich Haussler – 1 Simon Clarke – 1, Kaden Groves - 1
- there have been 9 Australian cyclists that have been members of stage team time trial wins – Stuart O'Grady – 2, Simon Gerrans – 2, Simon Clarke – 1, Rohan Dennis – 1, Matthew Goss – 1, Brett Lancaster – 1, Cameron Meyer – 1, Allan Peiper – 1 and Richie Porte – 1
- six Australian Olympic gold medallists have ridden in the Tour – Russell Mockridge, Stuart O'Grady, Bradley McGee, Brett Lancaster, Luke Roberts and Kelland O'Brien.

== Leading Australian cyclists ==
Australian cyclists that have competed in five or more Tour de France as of the 2025 Tour.

Cyclist	Tours	Individual Stage Wins	Team Time Trial Stage Wins	Jerseys held	Jerseys won
Stuart O'Grady	17	2	2	1998, (Note: O'Grady has admitted that he had taken EPO prior to the 1998 Tour de France "I doped for 1998 Tour de France, confesses Australian cycling star Stuart O'Grady". The Advertiser. Adelaide.) 2001 2004	
Phil Anderson	13	2	0	1981, 1982 1981, 1982	1982
Robbie McEwen	12	12	0	2004 2002, 2003, 2004, 2006, 2007	2002, 2004, 2006
Simon Gerrans	12	2	2	2013	
Luke Durbridge	12	0	0		
Michael Rogers	11	1	0		
Richie Porte	11	0	1		
Luke Durbridge	12	0	0		
Mark Renshaw	10	0	0		
Cadel Evans	9	2	0	2008, 2010, 2011, 2011	2011
Adam Hansen	9	0	0		
Michael Mathews	8	3	0	2017	2017
Simon Clarke	8	1	1		
Neil Stephens	7	1	0		
Michael Mathews	8	3	0	2017	2017
Baden Cooke	6	1	0	2003	2003
Stephen Hodge	6	0	0		
Brett Lancaster	6	0	1		
Patrick Jonker (Note: Patrick Jonker is a dual Netherlands and Australian national but rode for Australia at 1992 and 1996 Olympic Games. "Patrick Jonker". Sports Reference – Olympic Sports. Archived from the original on 18 April 2020.)	5	0	0		
Jack Haig	6	0	0		
Bradley McGee	5	2	0	2003	
Allan Peiper	5	0	1	1984	
Caleb Ewan	5	5	0		

== List of Australian cyclists ==
DNS	Denotes a rider who did not start, followed by the stage before which he withdrew
DNF	Denotes a rider who did not finish, followed by the stage in which he withdrew
DSQ	Denotes a rider who was disqualified from the race, followed by the stage before which this occurred
OTL	Denotes a rider who was over time limit for stage

Table includes dual national Australian cyclists.

Year	Cyclist	Team	Highlights	Final position
1914	Don Kirkham	Phebus-Dunlop		17
1914	Iddo Munro	Phebus-Dunlop		20
1928	Hubert Opperman	Ravat–Wonder–Dunlop		18
1928	Percy Osborn	Ravat–Wonder–Dunlop		38
1928	Ernest Bainbridge	Ravat–Wonder–Dunlop		DNF – 15
1931	Hubert Opperman	Australia/Switzerland		12
1931	Richard Lamb	Australia/Switzerland		35
1931	Ossie Nicholson	Australia/Switzerland		DNF – 3
1931	Frankie Thomas	Australia/Switzerland		DNF – 3
1952	John Beasley	Luxembourg/Australia		DNF – 2
1955	John Beasley	Luxembourg/International		DNF – 3
1955	Russell Mockridge	Luxembourg/International		64
1967	Bill Lawrie (Note: Bill Lawrie in Tour de France is listed from Great Britain but was from Australia.)	Team Great Britain		DNS – 7
1974	Donald Allan	Frisol		103
1975	Donald Allan	Frisol		85
1981	Phil Anderson	Peugeot–Esso–Michelin	held after stage 5	10
1982	Phil Anderson	Peugeot–Shell–Michelin	won stage 2, held after stages 2–10 held after stages 2–21	5
1983	Phil Anderson	Peugeot–Shell–Michelin		9
1984	Phil Anderson	Panasonic–Raleigh		10
1984	Allan Peiper	Peugeot–Shell–Michelin		95
1985	Phil Anderson	Panasonic–Raleigh		5
1985	Allan Peiper	Peugeot–Shell–Michelin		86
1986	Phil Anderson	Panasonic–Merckx–Agu		39
1987	Phil Anderson	Panasonic–Isostar		27
1987	Allan Peiper	Panasonic–Isostar		DNF – 21
1987	Shane Sutton	ANC–Halfords–Lycra		DNF – 13
1987	Květoslav Palov (Note: Květoslav Palov nationality is in dispute. Tour de France database listed him from Czech Republic but other sources indicate he had Australian citizenship. Bacon, Ellis (2004). Cycling anthology. Volume 2. London: Yellow Jersey Publishing. ISBN 9780224099561.)	ANC–Halfords–Lycra		103
1988	Michael Wilson	Weinmann–La Suisse–SMM Uster		50
1989	Michael Wilson	Helvetia–La Suisse		69
1989	Phil Anderson	TVM		38
1989	Stephen Hodge	Paternina–Marcos Eguizabal		83
1990	Phil Anderson	TVM		71
1990	Stephen Hodge	ONCE		34
1990	Allan Peiper	Panasonic–Sportlife	won stage 2 (TTT)	DNF – 8
1991	Phil Anderson	Motorola	won stage 10	45
1991	Stephen Hodge	ONCE		67
1992	Phil Anderson	Motorola		81
1992	Stephen Hodge	ONCE		93
1992	Neil Stephens	ONCE		74
1992	Allan Peiper	Tulip		126
1993	Phil Anderson	Motorola		84
1993	Neil Stephens	ONCE		DNF – 13
1994	Phil Anderson	Motorola		69
1994	Neil Stephens	ONCE		52
1994	Stephen Hodge	Festina		83
1994	Patrick Jonker	Novemail–Laser Computer		DNF – 14
1995	Neil Stephens	ONCE		60
1995	Stephen Hodge	Festina		64
1996	Neil Stephens	ONCE		49
1996	Patrick Jonker	ONCE		12
1996	Scott Sunderland	Loto		101
1997	Neil Stephens	Festina	won stage 17	54
1997	Patrick Jonker	Rabobank		62
1997	Robbie McEwen	Rabobank		117
1997	Henk Vogels	GAN		99
1997	Stuart O'Grady	GAN		109
1998	Robbie McEwen	Rabobank		63
1998	Stuart O'Grady	GAN	won stage 14, held after stages 4–6	54
1998	Neil Stephens	Festina–Lotus		DNF – 6
1998	Patrick Jonker	Rabobank		34
1999	Robbie McEwen	Rabobank	won stage 20	122
1999	Stuart O'Grady	Crédit Agricole	held after stages 9–11	94
1999	Patrick Jonker	Rabobank		97
1999	Henk Vogels	Crédit Agricole		121
1999	Jay Sweet	BigMat–Auber 93		DNF – 15
2000	Robbie McEwen	Farm Frites		113
2000	Stuart O'Grady	Crédit Agricole		DNF – 7
2001	Stuart O'Grady	Crédit Agricole	won stage 5 (TTT), held after stages 3–6 & 8–9, held after stages 8–19	54
2001	Bradley McGee	Française des Jeux		83
2002	Stuart O'Grady	Crédit Agricole		77
2002	Bradley McGee	Française des Jeux	won stage 7	109
2002	Baden Cooke	Française des Jeux		127
2002	Robbie McEwen	Lotto–Adecco	won stages 3 & 20, held after stages 10 & 13–20	130
2003	Stuart O'Grady	Crédit Agricole		90
2003	Robbie McEwen	Lotto–Domo	held after stages 2–5 & 18–19	143
2003	Bradley McGee	FDJeux.com	won prologue, held after prologue & stages 1–2 held after prologue	133
2003	Baden Cooke	FDJeux.com	won stage 2 held after stages 7–17 & 20	140
2003	Matthew Wilson	FDJeux.com		DNF – 11
2003	Michael Rogers	Quick-Step–Davitamon		42
2003	Nick Gates	Lotto–Domo		DNF – 16
2004	Stuart O'Grady	Cofidis – Le Crédit par Téléphone	won stage 5, held after stages 6–7	61
2004	Bradley McGee	Française des Jeux		DNF – 5
2004	Baden Cooke	Française des Jeux		139
2004	Matthew Wilson	Française des Jeux		144
2004	Michael Rogers	Quick-Step–Davitamon		22
2004	Robbie McEwen	Lotto–Domo	won stages 2 & 9, held after stage 3 held after stages 3–5 & 8–20	122
2004	Nick Gates	Lotto–Domo		DNF – 1
2004	Scott Sunderland	Alessio–Bianchi		96
2004	Allan Davis	Liberty Seguros		98
2005	Stuart O'Grady	Cofidis – Le Crédit par Téléphone		77
2005	Bradley McGee	Française des Jeux		105
2005	Baden Cooke	Française des Jeux		142
2005	Simon Gerrans	Ag2r		126
2005	Michael Rogers	Quick Step		41
2005	Robbie McEwen	Davitamon–Lotto	won stages 5, 7 &13	134
2005	Matt White	Cofidis		123
2005	Luke Roberts	Team CSC		123
2005	Allan Davis	Liberty Seguros–Würth		84
2005	Cadel Evans	Davitamon–Lotto		8
2006	Stuart O'Grady	Team CSC		91
2006	Michael Rogers	T-Mobile Team		9
2006	Simon Gerrans	AG2R Prévoyance		79
2006	Cadel Evans	Davitamon–Lotto		4
2006	Robbie McEwen	Davitamon–Lotto	won stages 2, 4 & 6 held after stages 2 & 4–20	116
2007	Stuart O'Grady	Team CSC		DNF – 8
2007	Michael Rogers	T-Mobile Team		DNF – 8
2007	Simon Gerrans	AG2R Prévoyance		94
2007	Cadel Evans	Predictor–Lotto	won stage 13	2
2007	Robbie McEwen	Predictor–Lotto	won stage 1, held after stage 1	DSQ – 8
2007	Heinrich Haussler (Note: Heinrich Haussler, a dual German and Australian national, rode for German teams until 2010. "Haussler renounces German citizenship". Cycling News, 8 July 2010.)	Gerolsteiner		129
2007	Brett Lancaster	Team Milram		DNF – 5
2008	Stuart O'Grady	Team CSC Saxo Bank		109
2008	Simon Gerrans	Crédit Agricole	won stage 15	79
2008	Cadel Evans	Silence–Lotto	held after stages 10–14	2
2008	Robbie McEwen	Silence–Lotto		122
2008	Brett Lancaster	Team Milram		129
2008	Baden Cooke	Barlowoeld		DNF – 12
2008	Mark Renshaw	Crédit Agricole		DNF – 15
2008	Trent Lowe	Garmin–Chipotle		77
2008	Adam Hansen	Team Columbia		108
2008	Heinrich Haussler	Gerolsteiner		126
2009	Stuart O'Grady	Team Saxo Bank		124
2009	Cadel Evans	Silence–Lotto		30
2009	Brett Lancaster	Cervélo TestTeam		127
2009	Mark Renshaw	Team Columbia–HTC		149
2009	Michael Rogers	Team Columbia–HTC		103
2009	Matthew Lloyd	Silence–Lotto		46
2009	Heinrich Haussler	Cervélo TestTeam		97
2010	Stuart O'Grady	Team Saxo Bank		149
2010	Cadel Evans	BMC Racing Team	held after stage 8	26
2010	Brett Lancaster	Cervélo TestTeam		159
2010	Michael Rogers	Team Columbia–HTC		37
2010	Matthew Lloyd	Omega Pharma–Lotto		47
2010	Simon Gerrans	Team Sky		DNS – 9
2010	Robbie McEwen	Team Katusha		165
2010	Adam Hansen	Team HTC–Columbia		DNS – 2
2010	Mark Renshaw	Team Columbia–HTC		DSQ – 12
2010	Luke Roberts	Team Milram		103
2010	Wesley Sulzberger	FDJ		152
2011	Stuart O'Grady	Leopard Trek		78
2011	Simon Gerrans	Team Sky		96
2011	Cadel Evans	BMC Racing Team	won stage 4, held after stages 20–21, held after stages 4–5	1
2011	Mark Renshaw	HTC–Highroad		163
2011	Richie Porte	Saxo Bank–SunGard		72
2011	Matthew Goss	HTC–Highroad		142
2012	Stuart O'Grady	Orica–GreenEDGE		97
2012	Cadel Evans	BMC Racing Team		7
2012	Mark Renshaw	Rabobank		DNF – 11
2012	Richie Porte	Team Sky		34
2012	Matthew Goss	Orica–GreenEDGE		120
2012	Matthew Lloyd	Lampre–ISD		DNS – 10
2012	Simon Gerrans	Orica–GreenEDGE		79
2012	Baden Cooke	Orica–GreenEDGE		117
2012	Michael Rogers	Team Sky		23
2012	Jonathan Cantwell	Saxo Bank–Tinkoff Bank		137
2012	Brett Lancaster	Orica–GreenEDGE		DNF – 15
2012	Adam Hansen	Lotto–Belisol		81
2013	Stuart O'Grady	Orica–GreenEDGE	won stage 4 (TTT)	161
2013	Cadel Evans	BMC Racing Team		39
2013	Richie Porte	Team Sky		19
2013	Matthew Goss	Orica–GreenEDGE	won stage 4 (TTT)	152
2013	Simon Gerrans	Orica–GreenEDGE	won stages 3 & 4 (TTT), held after stages 4–5	80
2013	Michael Rogers	Saxo–Tinkoff		16
2013	Brett Lancaster	Orica–GreenEDGE	won stage 4 (TTT)	154
2013	Adam Hansen	Lotto–Belisol		72
2013	Rohan Dennis	Garmin–Sharp		DNS – 9
2013	Cameron Meyer	Orica–GreenEDGE	won stage 4 (TTT)	130
2013	Simon Clarke	Orica–GreenEDGE	won stage 4 (TTT)	68
2014	Richie Porte	Team Sky		23
2014	Simon Gerrans	Orica–GreenEDGE		DNS – 17
2014	Michael Rogers	Tinkoff–Saxo	won stage 16	26
2014	Simon Clarke	Orica–GreenEDGE		113
2014	Mark Renshaw	Omega Pharma–Quick-Step		142
2014	Adam Hansen	Lotto–Belisol		64
2014	Luke Durbridge	Orica–GreenEDGE		122
2014	Mathew Hayman	Orica–GreenEDGE		DNF – 10
2014	Heinrich Haussler	IAM Cycling		DNF – 18
2014	Zak Dempster	NetApp–Endura		151
2015	Richie Porte	Team Sky		48
2015	Simon Gerrans	Orica–GreenEDGE		DNS – 3
2015	Michael Rogers	Tinkoff–Saxo		36
2015	Mark Renshaw	Etixx–Quick-Step		DNF – 18
2015	Adam Hansen	Lotto–Soudal		114
2015	Luke Durbridge	Orica–GreenEDGE		151
2015	Michael Matthews	Orica–GreenEDGE		152
2015	Zak Dempster	NetApp–Endura		DNF – 12
2015	Rohan Dennis	BMC Racing Team	won stages 1 & 9, held, & after stage 1	101
2015	Nathan Haas	Cannondale–Garmin		DNF – 17
2016	Leigh Howard	IAM Cycling		172
2016	Richie Porte	BMC Racing Team		5
2016	Rohan Dennis	BMC Racing Team		DNS – 16
2016	Mark Renshaw	Team Dimension Data		DNF – 9
2016	Adam Hansen	Lotto–Soudal		100
2016	Simon Gerrans	Orica–BikeExchange		DNS – 13
2016	Luke Durbridge	Orica–BikeExchange		112
2016	Mathew Hayman	Orica–BikeExchange		135
2016	Michael Matthews	Orica–BikeExchange	won stage 10	110
2017	Richie Porte	BMC Racing Team		DNF – 9
2017	Mark Renshaw	Team Dimension Data		DNF – 9
2017	Adam Hansen	Lotto–Soudal		113
2017	Michael Matthews	Team Sunweb	won Stage 14, Stage 16, held from Stage 17 to finish	69
2017	Luke Durbridge	Orica–Scott		DNF – 2
2017	Mathew Hayman	Orica–Scott		151
2017	Damien Howson	Orica–Scott		88
2017	Simon Clarke	Cannondale–Drapac		86
2017	Jay McCarthy	Bora–Hansgrohe		94
2018	Richie Porte	BMC Racing Team	won stage 3 (TTT)	DNF – 9
2018	Mark Renshaw	Team Dimension Data		DNF – 11
2018	Simon Gerrans	BMC Racing Team	won stage 3 (TTT)	107
2018	Michael Matthews	Team Sunweb		DNS – 5
2018	Luke Durbridge	Mitchelton–Scott		118
2018	Mathew Hayman	Mitchelton–Scott		108
2018	Michael Hepburn	Mitchelton–Scott		117
2018	Damien Howson	Mitchelton–Scott		DNF – 16
2018	Simon Clarke	EF Education First–Drapac p/b Cannondale		100
2018	Heinrich Haussler	Bahrain–Mérida		125
2018	Rory Sutherland	UAE Team Emirates		106
2019	Richie Porte	Trek-Segafredo		11
2019	Michael Matthews	Team Sunweb		67
2019	Michael Hepburn	Mitchelton–Scott		146
2019	Luke Durbridge	Mitchelton–Scott		109
2019	Jack Haig	Mitchelton–Scott		38
2019	Rohan Dennis	Bahrain-Mérida		DNF – 12
2019	Caleb Ewan	Lotto–Soudal	won stages 11, 16 & 21	132
2019	Simon Clarke	EF Education First		61
2020	Richie Porte	Trek-Segafredo		3
2020	Caleb Ewan	Lotto–Soudal	won Stage 3 & 11	144
2021	Richie Porte	Ineos Grenadiers		38
2021	Caleb Ewan	Lotto–Soudal		DNS – 4
2021	Michael Matthews	Team Bike Exchange		79
2021	Luke Durbridge	Team Bike Exchange		100
2021	Simon Clarke	Team Qhubeka NextHash		123
2021	Miles Scotson	Groupama–FDJ		DNF – 11
2021	Jack Haig	Team Bahrain Victorious		DNF – 3
2021	Ben O'Connor	AG2R Citroën Team	Won Stage 9	4
2021	Lucas Hamilton	Team BikeExchange		DNF – 13
2021	Harry Sweeny	Lotto–Soudal		85
2022	Simon Clarke	Israel–Premier Tech	won Stage 5	COV-15
2022	Caleb Ewan	Lotto–Soudal		135
2022	Ben O'Connor	AG2R Citroën Team		DNS-10
2022	Jack Haig	Team Bahrain Victorious		DNF-5
2022	Luke Durbridge	Team BikeExchange–Jayco		COV-10
2022	Michael Matthews	Team BikeExchange–Jayco	won Stage 14	78
2022	Nick Schultz	Team BikeExchange–Jayco		23
2022	Michael Storer	Groupama–FDJ		35
2022	Chris Hamilton	Team DSM		38
2023	Simon Clarke	Israel–Premier Tech		109
2023	Caleb Ewan	Lotto–Dstny		DNF-13
2023	Matthew Dinham	Team DSM		58
2023	Luke Durbridge	Team Jayco–AlUla		130
2023	Alex Edmondson	Team DSM		146
2023	Jack Haig	Team Bahrain Victorious		28
2023	Chris Hamilton	Team DSM		46
2023	Chris Harper	Team Jayco–AlUla		16
2023	Jai Hindley	Bora–Hansgrohe	won stage 5, held	7
2023	Ben O'Connor	AG2R Citroën Team		17
2023	Nick Schultz	Israel–Premier Tech		39
2023	Sam Welsford	Team DSM		144
2024	Luke Durbridge	Team Jayco–AlUla		123
2024	Jarrad Drizners	Lotto–Dstny		139
2024	Jack Haig	Team Bahrain Victorious		31
2024	Chris Harper	Team Jayco–AlUla		DNS-16
2024	Jai Hindley	Bora–Hansgrohe		18
2024	Michael Matthews	Team Jayco–AlUla		89
2025	Luke Durbridge	Team Jayco–AlUla		137
2025	Jarrad Drizners	Lotto		129
2025	Kaden Groves	Alpecin–Deceuninck	won Stage 20	86
2025	Jack Haig	Team Bahrain Victorious		DNF - 7
2025	Ben O'Connor	Team Jayco–AlUla	won stage 18	11
2025	Luke Plapp	Team Jayco–AlUla		121
2025	Callum Scotson	Decathlon–AG2R La Mondiale		33
2025	Michael Storer	Tudor Pro Cycling Team		42
2025	Robert Stannard	Team Bahrain Victorious		123
2025	Harry Sweeny	EF Education–EasyPost		35
2026	Sebastian Berwick	Caja Rural–Seguros RGA		89
2026	Luke Durbridge	Team Jayco–AlUla		107
2026	Jai Hindley	Red Bull–Bora–Hansgrohe		15
2026	Chris Harper	Pinarello–Q36.5 Pro Cycling Team		DNS - 11
2026	Damien Howson	Pinarello–Q36.5 Pro Cycling Team		88
2026	Michael Matthews	Team Jayco–AlUla		52
2026	Kelland O'Brien	Team Jayco–AlUla		OTL - 4
2026	Ben O'Connor	Team Jayco–AlUla		28
2026	Luke Plapp	Team Jayco–AlUla		91
2026	Michael Storer	Tudor Pro Cycling Team		63
2026	Robert Stannard	Team Bahrain Victorious		105

== See also ==
- List of Australian cyclists who have led the Tour de France general classification
- Category:Australian Tour de France stage winners
