= Liz Hepple =

Australian cyclist (born 1959)

Personal information
- Born: 7 July 1959 (age 67)

Cycling career
- Sport: Cycling

Elizabeth Hepple (born 7 July 1959) is an Australian former cyclist. She was a member of the University of Queensland cycling club. She was the first Australian ever to take the podium at Tour de France, placing third in 1988. She competed in the women's individual road race at the 1988 Summer Olympics. In the same year, she also placed third in the Grande Boucle Féminine Internationale and second in the Giro d'Italia Femminile. She won three times (1983 [its first edition], 1989, and 1990) at the Noosa Triathlon, placing first in the 1990 with a time of 2:07:35,

In 1992, she became a scholarship coach at the Queensland Academy of Sport, and in 2007 transitioned to athlete well being and engagement. In that role, she "has guided many of the best in Australian cycling and sport from Queensland."

In 2024, she was inducted into the Australian Cycling Hall of Fame.

== See also ==
- Australian cyclists at the Tour de France
