= Noosa Triathlon =

Athletic festival in Queensland, Australia

The Noosa Triathlon is an annual standard distance triathlon (1500m swim, 40 km bike, 10 km run) held in Noosa, in the Australian state of Queensland and organised by the World Triathlon Corporation. Since its first race in 1983 the competition has evolved from a single day race into an annual five-day multisport festival celebrating sports participation, healthy lifestyles, fitness and fun. The feature event on the final day of the festival is the Noosa Triathlon.

The founders of the Noosa Triathlon were David Power (former Australian Olympian and Commonwealth Games Medalist, a long distance runner), and his friend Joe Gilbert (Golden Gloves Champion Boxer, Queensland Rugby 'Reds' player, a swimmer and runner). Together with the Noosa Heads Lions Club, [of which Joe was a member], they staged the first Noosa Triathlon in October 1983.

Apart from the prize money which was paid to the various winners, the balance of funds raised from entry fees was donated to various voluntary organisations in the Noosa area which had assisted in the running of the event. Every fourth year, this 'surplus' was donated to the Australian Olympic Appeal.

In 2009 as part of the Q150 celebrations, the Noosa Triathlon was announced as one of the Q150 Icons of Queensland for its role as an "event and festival".

== Winners ==
=== Professional men ===
Year	Winner	Country	Time	Notes
1983	Michael Harris	Australia	1:55:21	
1984	Michael Harris	Australia	2:11:39	
1985	Nick Croft	Australia	2:05:30	
1986	Nick Croft	Australia	2:03:33	
1987	Stephen Foster	Australia	1:53:46	
1988	Brad Beven	Australia	1:53:37	
1989	Michael Maroney	Australia	1:54:19	
1990	Miles Stewart	Australia	2:03:33	
1991	Ben Bright	Australia	1:50:21	
1992	Simon Knowles	Australia	1:51:24	
1993	Eamon Nunn	Australia	1:53:23	
1994	Miles Stewart	Australia	1:46:58	
1995	Spencer Smith	England	1:46:06	
1996	Jeremy Ross	Australia	1:52:50	see also ITU event
1997	Craig Walton	Australia	1:44:13	
1998	Eamon Nunn	Australia	2:03:33	see also ITU event
1999	Eamon Nunn	Australia	1:47:49	see also ITU event
2000	Chris Hill	Australia	1:44:20	
2001	Paul Amey	New Zealand	1:47:59	
2002	Craig Walton	Australia	1:46:38	
2003	Craig Walton	Australia	1:44:50	
2004	Craig Walton	Australia	1:47:05	
2005	Chris McCormack	Australia	1:46:45	
2006	Craig Walton	Australia	1:47:46	
2007	Craig Walton	Australia	1:48:46	
2008	Courtney Atkinson	Australia	1:46:46	
2009	Courtney Atkinson	Australia	1:47:03	
2010	Courtney Atkinson	Australia	1:46:54	
2011	David Dellow	Australia	1:46:36	
2012	Peter Kerr	Australia	1:46:35	
2013	Aaron Royle	Australia	1:46:10	
2014	Aaron Royle	Australia	1:47:59	
2015	Joe Maloy	United States	1:47:04	
2016	Dan Wilson	Australia	1:49:41	
2017	Jacob Birtwhistle	Australia	1:46:59	
2018	Aaron Royle	Australia	1:48:51	
2019	Jacob Birtwhistle	Australia	1:43:39	
2020	Not staged due to COVID	-	-	
2021	Luke Willian	Australia	1:47:13	
2022	Charlie Quin	Australia	1:43:12	
2023	Hayden Wilde	New Zealand	1:41:56	
2024	Brayden Mercer	Australia	1:43:20	
2025	Matthew Hauser	Australia	1:42:38	

=== Professional women ===
Year	Winner	Country	Time	Notes
1983	Elizabeth Hepple	Australia	2:28:05	
1984	Erin Baker	New Zealand	2:01:09	
1985	Kim Hicks	Australia	2:28:20	
1986	Jan Wanklin	Australia	2:25:47	
1987	Sue Turner	Australia	2:11:14	
1988	Carol Pickard	Australia	2:08:12	
1989	Elizabeth Hepple	Australia	2:09:47	
1990	Elizabeth Hepple	Australia	2:07:45	
1991	Bianca VanWoesik	Australia	2:05:27	
1992	Rina Hill	Australia	2:08:02	
1993	Jackie Gallagher	Australia	2:02:37	
1994	Sarah Harrow	New Zealand	2:01:09	
1995	Rina Hill	Australia	2:02:09	
1996	Adrianne Ngawaiti	New Zealand	2:01:09	see also ITU event
1997	Emma Carney	Australia	1:54:22	
1998	Belinda Smith	Australia	2:04:37	see also ITU event
1999	Tania Brennan	Australia	2:02:02	see also ITU event
2000	Emma Carney	Australia	2:01:09	
2001	Loretta Harrop	Australia	2:01:09	
2002	Carol Montgomery	Canada	2:02:30	
2003	Emma Snowsill	Australia	1:56:09	
2004	Emma Snowsill	Australia	1:54:55	
2005	Emma Snowsill	Australia	1:55:23	
2006	Felicity Abram	Australia	2:00:03	
2007	Emma Snowsill	Australia	2:01:09	
2008	Emma Snowsill	Australia	1:59:39	
2009	Emma Jackson	Australia	2:01:02	
2010	Caroline Steffen	Switzerland	2:01:18	
2011	Melissa Rollison	Australia	2:00:25	
2012	Ashleigh Gentle	Australia	1:58:57	
2013	Emma Moffatt	Australia	1:58:41	
2014	Ashleigh Gentle	Australia	1:59:10	
2015	Ashleigh Gentle	Australia	1:59:18	
2016	Ashleigh Gentle	Australia	2:02:26	
2017	Ashleigh Gentle	Australia	2:00:48	
2018	Ashleigh Gentle	Australia	2:00:48	
2019	Ashleigh Gentle	Australia	1:57:53	
2020	Not staged due to COVID	-	-	
2021	Ashleigh Gentle	Australia	2:00:36	
2022	Ashleigh Gentle	Australia	1:57:26	
2023	Ashleigh Gentle	Australia	1:55:13	
2024	Ashleigh Gentle	Australia	1:55:56	
2025	Jess Fullagar	Great Britain	1:56:08	

== Golden Legends ==
Participants who have completed the event 30 times as individuals are awarded "Golden Legend" status. Standard "Legends Club" membership is after 10 events (recipients too numerous to list presently).

Year Awarded	Recipient	Country	Notes
2013	Garth Prowd	Australia	Recognition of years of service
2013	Peter O'Neill	Australia	Most ever starts (42)
2015	Ron Acutt	Australia	Most consecutive finishes (40)
2014	Tony Duffy	Australia	
2018	Brian Harrington	Australia	
2018	Neale Glanfield	Australia	
2021	Dennis Bates	Australia	
2021	John Dixon	Australia	
2021	Christopher Hackett	Australia	
2023	Glenn Schwarzel	Australia	
2023	Anthoni Marchesani	Australia	
2023	Scott Braby	Australia	
2023	Angela Clark-O'Connor	Australia	
2024	Royce Fairbrother	Australia	
2023	Dennis Bates	Australia	
2023	Mark Buchanan	Australia	

== ITU Events held in conjunction with the Noosa Triathlon ==
=== Men ===
Year	Winner	Country	Time	Notes
1996	Miles Stewart	Australia	1:55:21	
1998	Gilberto González	Venezuela	1:55:21	
1999	Shane Reed	New Zealand	1:55:21	

=== Women ===
Year	Winner	Country	Time	Notes
1996	Carol Montgomery	Canada	1:58:42	
1998	Loretta Harrop	Australia	1:59:39	
1999	Michelle Dillon	United Kingdom	1:55:03	
