= David Dellow =

Australian triathlete (born 1979)

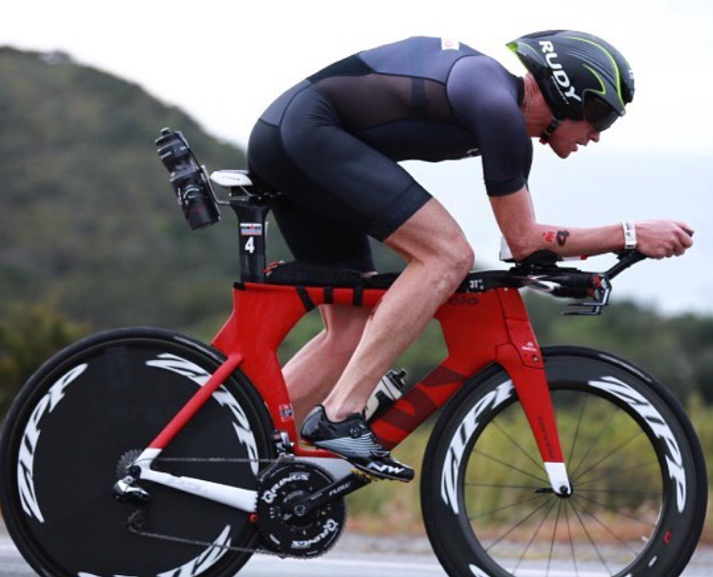

Personal information
- Nickname: Dangerous
- Nationality: Australian
- Born: 1979 (age 46–47)
- Height: 188 cm (6 ft 2 in)
- Weight: 79 kg (174 lb)

Sport
- Sport: Triathlon

David "Dangerous" Dellow (born 21 April 1979 in Brisbane) is an Australian triathlete. He is best known for his wins at Noosa Triathlon 2011 and Cairns Ironman.

== Early life ==
Son to David and Cheryl who both competed in triathlon events, David caught the triathlon bug early on life and competed in his first triathlon when he was only 12 years of age.

One of a few triathletes to go Sub-8 hours for an Ironman Triathlon (in Challenge Roth 2015), David competed in shorter Sprint and Olympic distance triathlons beforealater focusing on long-course and Ironman events.

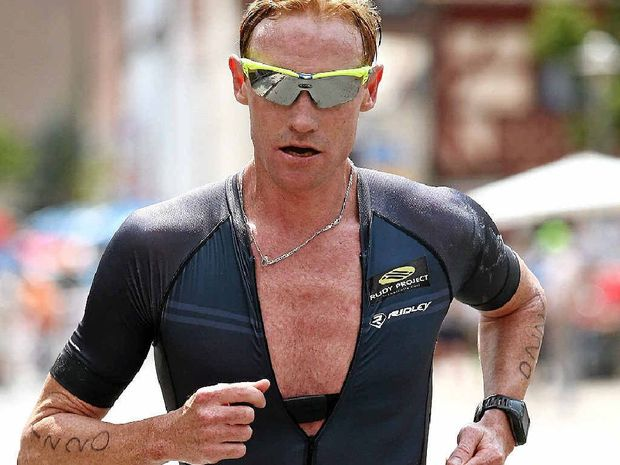

== Sponsorships ==
- Cervelo
- McDonald's
- Rotor
- Zipp
- Cannibal
- Rudy Project
- Hoka

== Results ==
=== 2008 ===
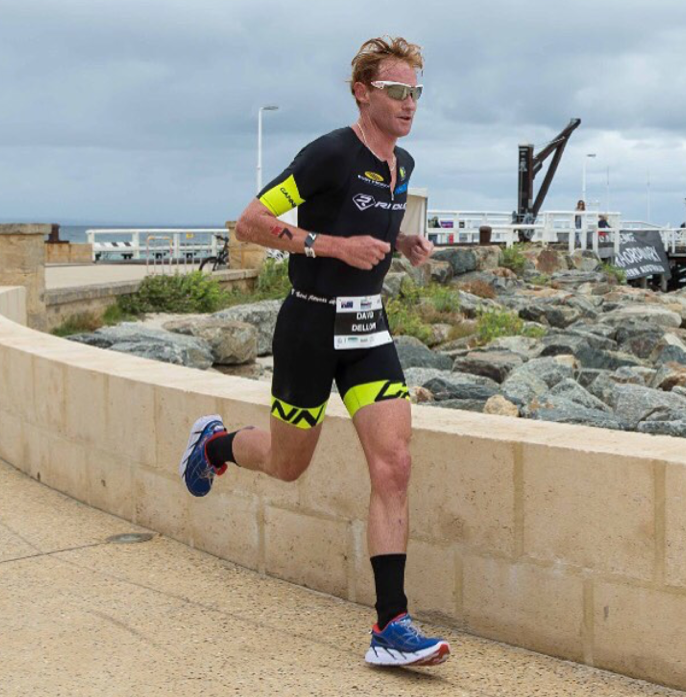

Geelong 70.3 - 3rd

| David Dellow (AUS) | 4:01:01 |

Gold Coast Half Ironman Winner

=== 2009 ===
Geelong 70.3 - 2nd

| David Dellow (AUS) | 3:53:02 |

=== 2011 ===
Noosa Triathlon Olympic Distance

| 2011 | David Dellow | Australia | 1:46:36 |

=== 2012 ===
Cairns Ironman

| Name | Country | Swim | Bike | Run | Finish | Div. Rank | Overall |
| DELLOW, David | Australia | 0:47:56 | 4:33:45 | 2:48:26 | 8:15:04 | 1 | 1 |

3rd - Embrunmann

Ironman World Championship

| 9 | 8:35:02 | David Dellow | Australia | 0:51:33 | 1:44 | 4:40:28 | 2:16 | 2:59:0 |

=== 2013 ===
3rd - Philippines 70.3

| David Dellow (AUS) | 4:02:2 |

3rd - Busselton Ironman

=== 2014 ===
Hervey Bay 100 Winner

=== 2016 ===
Port Macquarie Ironman - 2nd

Cairns Ironman - 2nd - David Dellow 8:19:13

== Media ==
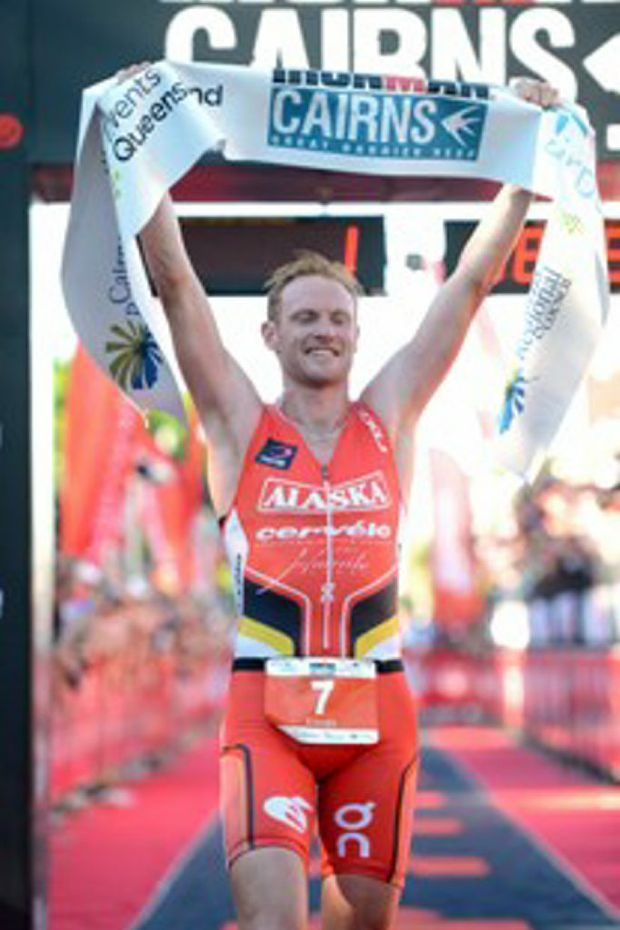
