= List of teams and cyclists in the 2010 Tour de France =

The 2010 Tour de France was the 97th edition of the Tour de France, one of cycling's Grand Tours. This Tour featured 22 cycling teams. Eighteen of the teams invited to the Tour were a part of the UCI ProTour, the other four teams were Professional Continental teams. The Tour will begin in Rotterdam, which is located in the Netherlands on 3 July, and finish on the Champs-Élysées in Paris on 25 July.

Twenty-two teams have been invited to participate in the 2010 Tour de France. Sixteen teams, including two which are no longer part of the UCI ProTour, are covered by a September 2008 agreement with the Union Cycliste Internationale. The sixteen teams are:

== Teams ==
Qualified teams

- Ag2r–La Mondiale
- Astana
- Bbox Bouygues Telecom *
- Caisse d'Epargne
- Cofidis *
- Euskaltel–Euskadi
- Footon–Servetto–Fuji
- FDJ
- Lampre–Farnese
- Liquigas–Doimo
- Omega Pharma–Lotto
- Quick-Step
- Rabobank
- Team HTC–Columbia
- Team Milram
- Team Saxo Bank

Invited teams

- BMC Racing Team *
- Cervélo TestTeam *
- Garmin–Transitions
- Team Katusha
- Team RadioShack
- Team Sky

* Teams not part of the ProTour.

== Cyclists ==
As of 1 July 2010.

Legend
No.	Starting number worn by the rider during the Tour
Pos.	Position in the general classification
‡	Denotes riders born on or after 1 January 1985 eligible for the young rider classification
HD	Denotes a rider finished outside the time limit, followed by the stage in which they did so
DNS	Denotes a rider who did not start, followed by the stage before which they withdrew
DNF	Denotes a rider who did not finish, followed by the stage in which they withdrew
DSQ	Denotes a rider who was disqualified, followed by the stage in which they were withdrawn

=== By team ===
Astana AST
No.		Age	Pos.
1	Alberto Contador (ESP)	27	DSQ
2	David de la Fuente (ESP)	29	110
3	Andriy Hryvko (UKR)	27	136
4	Jesús Hernández (ESP)	29	140
5	Maxim Iglinsky (KAZ)	29	131
6	Daniel Navarro (ESP)	27	49
7	Benjamín Noval (ESP)	31	104
8	Paolo Tiralongo (ITA)	33	54
9	Alexander Vinokourov (KAZ)	37	16
Team manager: Yvon Sanquier

Team Saxo Bank SAX
No.		Age	Pos.
11	Andy Schleck (LUX)	25‡	1
12	Matti Breschel (DEN)	26	142
13	Fabian Cancellara (SUI)	29	121
14	Jakob Fuglsang (DEN)	25‡	50
15	Stuart O'Grady (AUS)	37	149
16	Fränk Schleck (LUX)	30	DNF-3
17	Chris Anker Sørensen (DEN)	26	69
18	Nicki Sørensen (DEN)	35	155
19	Jens Voigt (GER)	39	126
Team manager: Bjarne Riis

Team RadioShack RSH
No.		Age	Pos.
21	Lance Armstrong (USA)	38	DSQ
22	Janez Brajkovič (SLO)	26	43
23	Chris Horner (USA)	38	10
24	Andreas Klöden (GER)	35	14
25	Levi Leipheimer (USA)	37	13
26	Dimitry Muravyev (KAZ)	31	148
27	Sérgio Paulinho (POR)	30	46
28	Yaroslav Popovych (UKR)	30	85
29	Grégory Rast (SUI)	30	114
Team manager: Johan Bruyneel

Team Sky SKY
No.		Age	Pos.
31	Bradley Wiggins (GBR)	30	24
32	Michael Barry (CAN)	34	99
33	Steve Cummings (GBR)	29	151
34	Juan Antonio Flecha (ESP)	32	89
35	Simon Gerrans (AUS)	30	DNS-9
36	Edvald Boasson Hagen (NOR)	23‡	116
37	Thomas Löfkvist (SWE)	26	17
38	Serge Pauwels (BEL)	26	107
39	Geraint Thomas (GBR)	24‡	67
Team manager: Dave Brailsford

Liquigas–Doimo LIQ
No.		Age	Pos.
41	Ivan Basso (ITA)	32	32
42	Francesco Bellotti (ITA)	30	122
43	Kristjan Koren (SLO)	24‡	94
44	Roman Kreuziger (CZE)	24‡	9
45	Aleksandr Kuschynski (BLR)	30	86
46	Daniel Oss (ITA)	23‡	124
47	Manuel Quinziato (ITA)	30	162
48	Sylwester Szmyd (POL)	32	61
49	Brian Vandborg (DEN)	28	128
Team manager: Roberto Amadio

Garmin–Transitions GRM
No.		Age	Pos.
51	Christian Vande Velde (USA)	34	DNS-3
52	Julian Dean (NZL)	35	157
53	Tyler Farrar (USA)	26	DNF-12
54	Ryder Hesjedal (CAN)	29	7
55	Robert Hunter (RSA)	33	DNS-11
56	Martijn Maaskant (NED)	26	139
57	David Millar (GBR)	33	158
58	Johan Vansummeren (BEL)	29	30
59	David Zabriskie (USA)	31	101
Team manager: Jonathan Vaughters

FDJ FDJ
No.		Age	Pos.
61	Christophe Le Mével (FRA)	29	42
62	Sandy Casar (FRA)	31	25
63	Rémy Di Gregorio (FRA)	24‡	78
64	Anthony Geslin (FRA)	30	146
65	Mathieu Ladagnous (FRA)	25	93
66	Anthony Roux (FRA)	23	167
67	Jérémy Roy (FRA)	27	143
68	Wesley Sulzberger (AUS)	23‡	152
69	Benoît Vaugrenard (FRA)	28	96
Team manager: Marc Madiot

Team Katusha KAT
No.		Age	Pos.
71	Vladimir Karpets (RUS)	29	DNS-9
72	Pavel Brutt (RUS)	28	102
73	Sergei Ivanov (RUS)	35	109
74	Alexandr Kolobnev (RUS)	29	65
75	Robbie McEwen (AUS)	38	165
76	Alexandre Pliușchin (MDA)	23‡	108
77	Joaquim Rodríguez (ESP)	31	8
78	Stijn Vandenbergh (BEL)	26	HD-7
79	Eduard Vorganov (RUS)	27	79
Team manager: Andrei Tchmil

Ag2r–La Mondiale ALM
No.		Age	Pos.
81	Nicolas Roche (IRL)	26	15
82	Maxime Bouet (FRA)	23‡	106
83	Dimitri Champion (FRA)	26	160
84	Martin Elmiger (SUI)	31	75
85	John Gadret (FRA)	31	19
86	David Lelay (FRA)	30	DNF-3
87	Lloyd Mondory (FRA)	28	118
88	Rinaldo Nocentini (ITA)	32	98
89	Christophe Riblon (FRA)	29	28
Team manager: Vincent Lavenu

Cervélo TestTeam CTT
No.		Age	Pos.
91	Carlos Sastre (ESP)	35	20
92	Xavier Florencio (ESP)	30	DNS-P
93	Volodymir Gustov (UKR)	33	34
94	Jeremy Hunt (GBR)	36	163
95	Thor Hushovd (NOR)	32	111
96	Andreas Klier (GER)	34	168
97	Ignatas Konovalovas (LTU)	24‡	127
98	Brett Lancaster (AUS)	30	159
99	Daniel Lloyd (GBR)	29	164
Team manager: Joop Alberda

Omega Pharma–Lotto OLO
No.		Age	Pos.
101	Jurgen Van den Broeck (BEL)	27	5
102	Mario Aerts (BEL)	35	33
103	Francis De Greef (BEL)	25‡	72
104	Mickaël Delage (FRA)	24‡	DNF-2
105	Sebastian Lang (GER)	30	80
106	Matthew Lloyd (AUS)	27	47
107	Daniel Moreno (ESP)	28	21
108	Jürgen Roelandts (BEL)	25‡	120
109	Charly Wegelius (GBR)	32	DNS-11
Team manager: Marc Sergeant

Team HTC–Columbia THR
No.		Age	Pos.
111	Mark Cavendish (GBR)	25‡	154
112	Bernhard Eisel (AUT)	29	156
113	Bert Grabsch (GER)	35	169
114	Adam Hansen (AUS)	29	DNS-2
115	Tony Martin (GER)	25‡	137
116	Maxime Monfort (BEL)	27	55
117	Mark Renshaw (AUS)	27	DSQ-12
118	Michael Rogers (AUS)	30	37
119	Kanstantsin Sivtsov (BLR)	27	39
Team manager: Bob Stapleton

BMC Racing Team BMC
No.		Age	Pos.
121	Cadel Evans (AUS)	33	26
122	Alessandro Ballan (ITA)	30	87
123	Brent Bookwalter (USA)	26	147
124	Marcus Burghardt (GER)	27	161
125	Mathias Frank (SUI)	23‡	DNS-1
126	George Hincapie (USA)	37	59
127	Karsten Kroon (NED)	34	138
128	Steve Morabito (SUI)	27	51
129	Mauro Santambrogio (ITA)	25	DNF-15
Team manager: John Lelangue

Quick-Step QST
No.		Age	Pos.
131	Sylvain Chavanel (FRA)	31	31
132	Carlos Barredo (ESP)	29	41
133	Kevin De Weert (BEL)	28	18
134	Dries Devenyns (BEL)	27	144
135	Jérôme Pineau (FRA)	30	66
136	Francesco Reda (ITA)	27	DNF-18
137	Kevin Seeldraeyers (BEL)	23‡	134
138	Jurgen Van de Walle (BEL)	33	63
139	Maarten Wynants (BEL)	28	117
Team manager: Patrick Lefevere

Team Milram MRM
No.		Age	Pos.
141	Linus Gerdemann (GER)	27	84
142	Gerald Ciolek (GER)	23‡	133
143	Johannes Fröhlinger (GER)	25‡	90
144	Roger Kluge (GER)	24‡	DNS-9
145	Christian Knees (GER)	29	91
146	Luke Roberts (AUS)	33	103
147	Thomas Rohregger (AUT)	27	74
148	Niki Terpstra (NED)	26	DNS-3
149	Fabian Wegmann (GER)	30	119
Team manager: Gerry Van Gerwen

Bbox Bouygues Telecom BTL
No.		Age	Pos.
151	Thomas Voeckler (FRA)	31	76
152	Yukiya Arashiro (JPN)	25	112
153	Anthony Charteau (FRA)	31	44
154	Pierrick Fédrigo (FRA)	31	57
155	Cyril Gautier (FRA)	22‡	45
156	Pierre Rolland (FRA)	23‡	58
157	Matthieu Sprick (FRA)	28	100
158	Sébastien Turgot (FRA)	26	113
159	Nicolas Vogondy (FRA)	32	88
Team manager: Jean-René Bernaudeau

Caisse d'Epargne GCE
No.		Age	Pos.
161	Luis León Sánchez (ESP)	26	11
162	Rui Costa (POR)	23‡	73
163	Imanol Erviti (ESP)	25	77
164	Iván Gutiérrez (ESP)	31	48
165	Vasil Kiryienka (BLR)	29	60
166	Christophe Moreau (FRA)	39	22
167	Mathieu Perget (FRA)	28	64
168	Rubén Plaza (ESP)	30	12
169	José Joaquín Rojas (ESP)	25‡	68
Team manager: Eusebio Unzué

Cofidis COF
No.		Age	Pos.
171	Rein Taaramäe (EST)	23‡	DNF-13
172	Stéphane Augé (FRA)	35	153
173	Samuel Dumoulin (FRA)	29	DNS-12
174	Julien El Fares (FRA)	25‡	27
175	Christophe Kern (FRA)	29	97
176	Sébastien Minard (FRA)	28	92
177	Amaël Moinard (FRA)	28	70
178	Damien Monier (FRA)	27	71
179	Rémi Pauriol (FRA)	28	38
Team manager: Éric Boyer

Euskaltel–Euskadi EUS
No.		Age	Pos.
181	Samuel Sánchez (ESP)	32	4
182	Iñaki Isasi (ESP)	33	115
183	Egoi Martínez (ESP)	32	40
184	Juan José Oroz (ESP)	30	DNS-7
185	Alan Pérez (ESP)	28	129
186	Rubén Pérez (ESP)	28	95
187	Amets Txurruka (ESP)	27	DNS-5
188	Iván Velasco (ESP)	30	62
189	Gorka Verdugo (ESP)	31	36
Team manager: Igor González de Galdeano

Rabobank RAB
No.		Age	Pos.
191	Denis Menchov (RUS)	32	3
192	Lars Boom (NED)	24‡	130
193	Óscar Freire (ESP)	34	141
194	Juan Manuel Gárate (ESP)	34	35
195	Robert Gesink (NED)	24‡	6
196	Koos Moerenhout (NED)	36	52
197	Grischa Niermann (GER)	34	56
198	Bram Tankink (NED)	31	DNS-16
199	Maarten Tjallingii (NED)	32	132
Team manager: Erik Breukink

Lampre–Farnese LAM
No.		Age	Pos.
201	Damiano Cunego (ITA)	28	29
202	Grega Bole (SLO)	24‡	125
203	Mauro Da Dalto (ITA)	29	123
204	Francesco Gavazzi (ITA)	25	105
205	Danilo Hondo (GER)	36	135
206	Mirco Lorenzetto (ITA)	29	166
207	Adriano Malori (ITA)	22‡	170
208	Alessandro Petacchi (ITA)	36	150
209	Simon Špilak (SLO)	24‡	DNF-17
Team manager: Giuseppe Saronni

Footon–Servetto–Fuji FOT
No.		Age	Pos.
211	Eros Capecchi (ITA)	24‡	83
212	José Alberto Benítez (ESP)	28	145
213	Manuel Antonio Cardoso (POR)	27	DNS-1
214	Arkaitz Durán (ESP)	24‡	81
215	Markus Eibegger (AUT)	25	DNF-9
216	Fabio Felline (ITA)	20‡	DNS-9
217	Iban Mayoz (ESP)	28	DNS-16
218	Aitor Pérez (ESP)	33	82
219	Rafael Valls (ESP)	23‡	53
Team manager: Mauro Gianetti

=== By rider ===
Legend
No.	Starting number worn by the rider during the Tour
Pos.	Position in the general classification
‡	Denotes riders born on or after 1 January 1985 eligible for the Young rider classification
DNS	Denotes a rider who did not start, followed by the stage before which he withdrew
DNF	Denotes a rider who did not finish, followed by the stage in which he withdrew
Age correct as of 3 July 2010, the date on which the Tour began

No.	Rider	Nationality	Team	Age	Pos.
1	Alberto Contador	Spain	Astana	27	1
2	David de la Fuente	Spain	Astana	29	110
3	Andriy Hryvko	Ukraine	Astana	26	136
4	Jesús Hernández	Spain	Astana	28	140
5	Maxim Iglinsky	Kazakhstan	Astana	29	131
6	Daniel Navarro	Spain	Astana	26	49
7	Benjamín Noval	Spain	Astana	31	104
8	Paolo Tiralongo	Italy	Astana	32	54
9	Alexander Vinokourov	Kazakhstan	Astana	36	16
11	Andy Schleck	Luxembourg	Team Saxo Bank	25^{‡}	2
12	Matti Breschel	Denmark	Team Saxo Bank	25	142
13	Fabian Cancellara	Switzerland	Team Saxo Bank	29	121
14	Jakob Fuglsang	Denmark	Team Saxo Bank	25^{‡}	50
15	Stuart O'Grady	Australia	Team Saxo Bank	36	149
16	Fränk Schleck	Luxembourg	Team Saxo Bank	30	DNF-3
17	Chris Anker Sørensen	Denmark	Team Saxo Bank	25	69
18	Nicki Sørensen	Denmark	Team Saxo Bank	35	155
19	Jens Voigt	Germany	Team Saxo Bank	38	126
21	Lance Armstrong	United States	Team RadioShack	38	23
22	Janez Brajkovič	Slovenia	Team RadioShack	26	43
23	Chris Horner	United States	Team RadioShack	38	10
24	Andreas Klöden	Germany	Team RadioShack	35	14
25	Levi Leipheimer	United States	Team RadioShack	36	13
26	Dimitry Muravyev	Kazakhstan	Team RadioShack	30	148
27	Sérgio Paulinho	Portugal	Team RadioShack	30	46
28	Yaroslav Popovych	Ukraine	Team RadioShack	30	85
29	Grégory Rast	Switzerland	Team RadioShack	30	114
31	Bradley Wiggins	Great Britain	Team Sky	30	24
32	Michael Barry	Canada	Team Sky	34	99
33	Steve Cummings	Great Britain	Team Sky	29	151
34	Juan Antonio Flecha	Spain	Team Sky	32	89
35	Simon Gerrans	Australia	Team Sky	30	DNS-9
36	Edvald Boasson Hagen	Norway	Team Sky	23^{‡}	116
37	Thomas Löfkvist	Sweden	Team Sky	26	17
38	Serge Pauwels	Belgium	Team Sky	26	107
39	Geraint Thomas	Great Britain	Team Sky	24^{‡}	67
41	Ivan Basso	Italy	Liquigas–Doimo	32	32
42	Francesco Bellotti	Italy	Liquigas–Doimo	30	122
43	Kristjan Koren	Slovenia	Liquigas–Doimo	23^{‡}	94
44	Roman Kreuziger	Czech Republic	Liquigas–Doimo	24^{‡}	9
45	Aleksandr Kuschynski	Belarus	Liquigas–Doimo	30	86
46	Daniel Oss	Italy	Liquigas–Doimo	23^{‡}	124
47	Manuel Quinziato	Italy	Liquigas–Doimo	30	162
48	Sylwester Szmyd	Poland	Liquigas–Doimo	32	61
49	Brian Vandborg	Denmark	Liquigas–Doimo	28	128
51	Christian Vande Velde	United States	Garmin–Transitions	34	DNS-3
52	Julian Dean	New Zealand	Garmin–Transitions	35	157
53	Tyler Farrar	United States	Garmin–Transitions	26	DNF-12
54	Ryder Hesjedal	Canada	Garmin–Transitions	29	7
55	Robert Hunter	South Africa	Garmin–Transitions	33	DNS-11
56	Martijn Maaskant	Netherlands	Garmin–Transitions	26	139
57	David Millar	Great Britain	Garmin–Transitions	33	158
58	Johan Vansummeren	Belgium	Garmin–Transitions	29	30
59	David Zabriskie	United States	Garmin–Transitions	31	101
61	Christophe Le Mével	France	FDJ	29	42
62	Sandy Casar	France	FDJ	31	25
63	Rémy Di Gregorio	France	FDJ	24^{‡}	78
64	Anthony Geslin	France	FDJ	30	146
65	Mathieu Ladagnous	France	FDJ	25	93
66	Anthony Roux	France	FDJ	23^{‡}	167
67	Jérémy Roy	France	FDJ	27	143
68	Wesley Sulzberger	Australia	FDJ	23^{‡}	152
69	Benoît Vaugrenard	France	FDJ	28	96
71	Vladimir Karpets	Russia	Team Katusha	29	DNS-9
72	Pavel Brutt	Russia	Team Katusha	28	102
73	Sergei Ivanov	Russia	Team Katusha	35	109
74	Alexandr Kolobnev	Russia	Team Katusha	29	65
75	Robbie McEwen	Australia	Team Katusha	38	165
76	Alexandre Pliușchin	Moldova	Team Katusha	23^{‡}	108
77	Joaquim Rodríguez	Spain	Team Katusha	31	8
78	Stijn Vandenbergh	Belgium	Team Katusha	26	HD-7
79	Eduard Vorganov	Russia	Team Katusha	27	79
81	Nicolas Roche	Ireland	Ag2r–La Mondiale	26	15
82	Maxime Bouet	France	Ag2r–La Mondiale	23^{‡}	106
83	Dimitri Champion	France	Ag2r–La Mondiale	26	160
84	Martin Elmiger	Switzerland	Ag2r–La Mondiale	31	75
85	John Gadret	France	Ag2r–La Mondiale	31	19
86	David Lelay	France	Ag2r–La Mondiale	30	DNF-3
87	Lloyd Mondory	France	Ag2r–La Mondiale	28	118
88	Rinaldo Nocentini	Italy	Ag2r–La Mondiale	32	98
89	Christophe Riblon	France	Ag2r–La Mondiale	29	28
91	Carlos Sastre	Spain	Cervélo TestTeam	35	20
92	Xavier Florencio	Spain	Cervélo TestTeam	30	DNS-P
93	Volodymir Gustov	Ukraine	Cervélo TestTeam	33	34
94	Jeremy Hunt	Great Britain	Cervélo TestTeam	36	163
95	Thor Hushovd	Norway	Cervélo TestTeam	32	111
96	Andreas Klier	Germany	Cervélo TestTeam	35	168
97	Ignatas Konovalovas	Lithuania	Cervélo TestTeam	24^{‡}	127
98	Brett Lancaster	Australia	Cervélo TestTeam	30	159
99	Daniel Lloyd	Great Britain	Cervélo TestTeam	29	164
101	Jurgen Van den Broeck	Belgium	Omega Pharma–Lotto	27	5
102	Mario Aerts	Belgium	Omega Pharma–Lotto	35	33
103	Francis De Greef	Belgium	Omega Pharma–Lotto	25^{‡}	72
104	Mickaël Delage	France	Omega Pharma–Lotto	24^{‡}	DNF-2
105	Sebastian Lang	Germany	Omega Pharma–Lotto	30	80
106	Matthew Lloyd	Australia	Omega Pharma–Lotto	27	47
107	Daniel Moreno	Spain	Omega Pharma–Lotto	28	21
108	Jürgen Roelandts	Belgium	Omega Pharma–Lotto	25^{‡}	120
109	Charly Wegelius	Great Britain	Omega Pharma–Lotto	32	DNS-11
111	Mark Cavendish	Great Britain	Team HTC–Columbia	25^{‡}	154
112	Bernhard Eisel	Austria	Team HTC–Columbia	29	156
113	Bert Grabsch	Germany	Team HTC–Columbia	35	169
114	Adam Hansen	Australia	Team HTC–Columbia	29	DNS-2
115	Tony Martin	Germany	Team HTC–Columbia	25^{‡}	137
116	Maxime Monfort	Belgium	Team HTC–Columbia	27	55
117	Mark Renshaw	Australia	Team HTC–Columbia	27	DSQ-12
118	Michael Rogers	Australia	Team HTC–Columbia	30	37
119	Kanstantsin Sivtsov	Belarus	Team HTC–Columbia	27	39
121	Cadel Evans	Australia	BMC Racing Team	33	26
122	Alessandro Ballan	Italy	BMC Racing Team	30	87
123	Brent Bookwalter	United States	BMC Racing Team	26	147
124	Marcus Burghardt	Germany	BMC Racing Team	27	161
125	Mathias Frank	Switzerland	BMC Racing Team	23^{‡}	DNS-1
126	George Hincapie	United States	BMC Racing Team	37	59
127	Karsten Kroon	Netherlands	BMC Racing Team	34	138
128	Steve Morabito	Switzerland	BMC Racing Team	27	51
129	Mauro Santambrogio	Italy	BMC Racing Team	25	DNF-15
131	Sylvain Chavanel	France	Quick-Step	30	31
132	Carlos Barredo	Spain	Quick-Step	29	41
133	Kevin De Weert	Belgium	Quick-Step	28	18
134	Dries Devenyns	Belgium	Quick-Step	26	144
135	Jérôme Pineau	France	Quick-Step	30	66
136	Francesco Reda	Italy	Quick-Step	27	DNF-18
137	Kevin Seeldraeyers	Belgium	Quick-Step	23^{‡}	134
138	Jurgen Van de Walle	Belgium	Quick-Step	33	63
139	Maarten Wynants	Belgium	Quick-Step	28	117
141	Linus Gerdemann	Germany	Team Milram	27	84
142	Gerald Ciolek	Germany	Team Milram	23^{‡}	133
143	Johannes Fröhlinger	Germany	Team Milram	25^{‡}	90
144	Roger Kluge	Germany	Team Milram	24^{‡}	DNS-9
145	Christian Knees	Germany	Team Milram	29	91
146	Luke Roberts	Australia	Team Milram	33	103
147	Thomas Rohregger	Austria	Team Milram	27	74
148	Niki Terpstra	Netherlands	Team Milram	26	DNS-3
149	Fabian Wegmann	Germany	Team Milram	30	119
151	Thomas Voeckler	France	Bbox Bouygues Telecom	31	76
152	Yukiya Arashiro	Japan	Bbox Bouygues Telecom	25	112
153	Anthony Charteau	France	Bbox Bouygues Telecom	31	44
154	Pierrick Fédrigo	France	Bbox Bouygues Telecom	31	57
155	Cyril Gautier	France	Bbox Bouygues Telecom	22^{‡}	45
156	Pierre Rolland	France	Bbox Bouygues Telecom	23^{‡}	58
157	Matthieu Sprick	France	Bbox Bouygues Telecom	28	100
158	Sébastien Turgot	France	Bbox Bouygues Telecom	26	113
159	Nicolas Vogondy	France	Bbox Bouygues Telecom	32	88
161	Luis León Sánchez	Spain	Caisse d'Epargne	26	11
162	Rui Costa	Portugal	Caisse d'Epargne	24^{‡}	73
163	Imanol Erviti	Spain	Caisse d'Epargne	26	77
164	Iván Gutiérrez	Spain	Caisse d'Epargne	31	48
165	Vasil Kiryienka	Belarus	Caisse d'Epargne	29	60
166	Christophe Moreau	France	Caisse d'Epargne	39	22
167	Mathieu Perget	France	Caisse d'Epargne	25	64
168	Rubén Plaza	Spain	Caisse d'Epargne	30	12
169	José Joaquín Rojas	Spain	Caisse d'Epargne	25^{‡}	68
171	Rein Taaramäe	Estonia	Cofidis	23^{‡}	DNF-13
172	Stéphane Augé	France	Cofidis	35	153
173	Samuel Dumoulin	France	Cofidis	29	DNS-12
174	Julien El Fares	France	Cofidis	25^{‡}	27
175	Christophe Kern	France	Cofidis	29	97
176	Sébastien Minard	France	Cofidis	28	92
177	Amaël Moinard	France	Cofidis	28	70
178	Damien Monier	France	Cofidis	27	71
179	Rémi Pauriol	France	Cofidis	28	38
181	Samuel Sánchez	Spain	Euskaltel–Euskadi	32	4
182	Iñaki Isasi	Spain	Euskaltel–Euskadi	33	115
183	Egoi Martínez	Spain	Euskaltel–Euskadi	32	40
184	Juan José Oroz	Spain	Euskaltel–Euskadi	29	DNS-7
185	Alan Pérez	Spain	Euskaltel–Euskadi	27	129
186	Rubén Pérez	Spain	Euskaltel–Euskadi	28	95
187	Amets Txurruka	Spain	Euskaltel–Euskadi	27	DNS-5
188	Iván Velasco	Spain	Euskaltel–Euskadi	30	62
189	Gorka Verdugo	Spain	Euskaltel–Euskadi	31	36
191	Denis Menchov	Russia	Rabobank	32	3
192	Lars Boom	Netherlands	Rabobank	24^{‡}	130
193	Óscar Freire	Spain	Rabobank	34	141
194	Juan Manuel Gárate	Spain	Rabobank	34	35
195	Robert Gesink	Netherlands	Rabobank	24^{‡}	6
196	Koos Moerenhout	Netherlands	Rabobank	36	52
197	Grischa Niermann	Germany	Rabobank	34	56
198	Bram Tankink	Netherlands	Rabobank	31	DNS-16
199	Maarten Tjallingii	Netherlands	Rabobank	32	132
201	Damiano Cunego	Italy	Lampre–Farnese	28	29
202	Grega Bole	Slovenia	Lampre–Farnese	24^{‡}	125
203	Mauro Da Dalto	Italy	Lampre–Farnese	29	123
204	Francesco Gavazzi	Italy	Lampre–Farnese	25	105
205	Danilo Hondo	Germany	Lampre–Farnese	36	135
206	Mirco Lorenzetto	Italy	Lampre–Farnese	28	166
207	Adriano Malori	Italy	Lampre–Farnese	22^{‡}	170
208	Alessandro Petacchi	Italy	Lampre–Farnese	36	150
209	Simon Špilak	Slovenia	Lampre–Farnese	24^{‡}	DNF-17
211	Eros Capecchi	Italy	Footon–Servetto–Fuji	24^{‡}	83
212	José Alberto Benítez	Spain	Footon–Servetto–Fuji	28	145
213	Manuel Antonio Cardoso	Portugal	Footon–Servetto–Fuji	27	DNS-1
214	Arkaitz Durán	Spain	Footon–Servetto–Fuji	24^{‡}	81
215	Markus Eibegger	Austria	Footon–Servetto–Fuji	25	DNF-9
216	Fabio Felline	Italy	Footon–Servetto–Fuji	20^{‡}	DNS-9
217	Iban Mayoz	Spain	Footon–Servetto–Fuji	28	DNS-16
218	Aitor Pérez	Spain	Footon–Servetto–Fuji	32	82
219	Rafael Valls	Spain	Footon–Servetto–Fuji	23^{‡}	53

=== By nationality ===
Country	No. of riders	Finishers	Stage wins
France	35	32 (91.43%)	6 (Sylvain Chavanel x2, Sandy Casar, Pierrick Fédrigo, Christophe Riblon, Thomas Voeckler)
Spain	32	28 (87.50%)	1 (Joaquim Rodríguez)
Italy	17	14 (82.35%)	2 (Alessandro Petacchi x2)
Germany	15	14 (93.34%)	0
Belgium	13	12 (92.31%)	0
Australia	11	8 (72.73%)	0
Netherlands	8	6 (75.00%)	0
Great Britain	8	7 (87.50%)	5 (Mark Cavendish x5)
United States	8	6 (75.00%)	0
Russia	6	5 (83.34%)	0
Denmark	5	5 (100.00%)	0
Switzerland	5	4 (80.00%)	2 (Fabian Cancellara x2)
Slovenia	4	3 (75.00%)	0
Austria	3	2 (66.67%)	0
Belarus	3	3 (100.00%)	0
Kazakhstan	3	3 (100.00%)	1 (Alexander Vinokourov)
Portugal	3	2 (66.67%)	1 (Sérgio Paulinho)
Ukraine	3	3 (100.00%)	0
Canada	2	2 (100.00%)	0
Luxembourg	2	1 (50.00%)	2 (Andy Schleck x2)
Norway	2	2 (100.00%)	1 (Thor Hushovd)
Czech Republic	1	1 (100.00%)	0
Estonia	1	0 (00.00%)	0
Ireland	1	1 (100.00%)	0
Japan	1	1 (100.00%)	0
Lithuania	1	1 (100.00%)	0
Moldova	1	1 (100.00%)	0
New Zealand	1	1 (100.00%)	0
Poland	1	1 (100.00%)	0
South Africa	1	0 (00.00%)	0
Sweden	1	1 (100.00%)	0
TOTAL	198	170 (85.86%)	21
