= Craig Walton =

Australian triathlete

Medal record

Men's triathlon

Representing Australia

ITU Triathlon World Championships
| Bronze medal – third place | 2000 Perth | Elite men's race |

Craig Walton (born 10 October 1975 in Ulverstone, Tasmania) is an Australian triathlete.

Walton competed in the triathlon at the 2000 Summer Olympics. He took twenty-seventh place with a total time of 1:50:57.66.

Walton was a powerful swimmer and strong cyclist. He typically established a large lead coming into the run leg but was frequently caught by faster runners before the finish. He enjoyed significantly more success in non-drafting events such as Noosa triathlon, which he won 7 times and for which he holds the course record. Walton was coach to Emma Moffatt and to his longtime partner, Emma Snowsill.
