= Květoslav Palov =

Czech cyclist

Personal information
- Full name: Květoslav Palov
- Nickname: Omar
- Born: 6 December 1962 (age 63) Brno, Czechoslovakia

Cycling career
- Sport: Cycling
- Current team: Retired
- Discipline: Road
- Role: Rider

Amateur team
- 1981–1986: Dukla Brno

Professional teams
- 1987: ANC-Halfords
- 1988: S.E.F.B. – Tönissteine
- 1989: Repco Cycles

Květoslav Palov (born 6 December 1962) is a former Czechoslovak and Australian cyclist. He was the first Czech to compete in the Tour de France. He uses the nickname Omar.

Palov was a member of the Czechoslovak national team in the 1980s. He refused to return from Italy where he raced in 1986.

In 1987, he participated as the first Czech in the Tour de France. With a Czechoslovak passport, he raced for the British team ANC-Halfords. He finished the Tour as 103rd.

He raced professionally until 1991 and retired from his racing career in Australia.

He lives and runs a business in Rockhampton, Australia.
