= List of teams and cyclists in the 2014 Tour de France =

The number of riders per nation participated in the 2014 Tour de France: 20+ / 10–19 / 2–9 / 1

The 2014 Tour de France was the 101st edition of the race, one of cycling's Grand Tours. The 3,358.1-kilometre (2,086.6 mi) race included 21 stages, starting in Leeds, United Kingdom, on 5 July and finishing on the Champs-Élysées in Paris on 27 July.

The race was contested by 22 teams. All of the eighteen UCI ProTeams were automatically invited, and obliged, to attend the race. On 14 January 2014, the organiser of the Tour, Amaury Sport Organisation (ASO), announced the four second-tier UCI Professional Continental teams given wildcard invitations: Cofidis, NetApp–Endura, Bretagne–Séché Environnement and IAM Cycling. The team presentation – where the members of each team's roster are introduced in front of the media and local dignitaries – took place at the First Direct Arena in Leeds, United Kingdom, on 3 July, two days before the opening stage held in the city. The riders arrived at the arena by a ceremonial ride from the University of Leeds. The event included performances from Embrace and Opera North in front of an audience of 10,000.

Each squad was allowed a maximum of nine riders, therefore the start list contained a total of 198 riders. Of these, 47 were riding the Tour de France for the first time. The total number of riders that finished the race was 174. The riders came from 34 countries; France, Spain, Italy, Netherlands, Germany, Australia and Belgium all had 10 or more riders in the race. Giant–Shimano's Ji Cheng was the first Chinese rider to participate in the Tour. Riders from eight countries won stages during the race; German riders won the largest number of stages, with seven. The average age of riders in the race was 29.88 years, ranging from the 20-year-old Danny van Poppel to the 42-year-old Jens Voigt, both Trek Factory Racing riders. Voigt, riding in his final year as a professional, equalled Stuart O'Grady's record for most appearances in the Tour with 17. Garmin–Sharp had the highest average age, while Trek Factory Racing had the lowest.

Marcel Kittel of Giant–Shimano was the first rider to wear the general classification's yellow jersey after winning stage one. He lost it after the next stage to Vincenzo Nibali (Astana), who won the stage. Nibali held the race lead until the end of the ninth stage, when it was taken by Lotto–Belisol's Tony Gallopin. The yellow jersey returned to Nibali the following stage, and he held it until the conclusion of the race. Second and third respectively were Jean-Christophe Péraud (Ag2r–La Mondiale) and Thibaut Pinot (FDJ.fr). The points classification was won by Peter Sagan of the Cannondale team. Rafał Majka (Tinkoff–Saxo), winner of two mountain stages, won the mountains classification. Pinot was the best young rider and the team classification was won by Ag2r–La Mondiale. Alessandro De Marchi (Cannondale) was given the award for the most combative rider.

== Teams ==
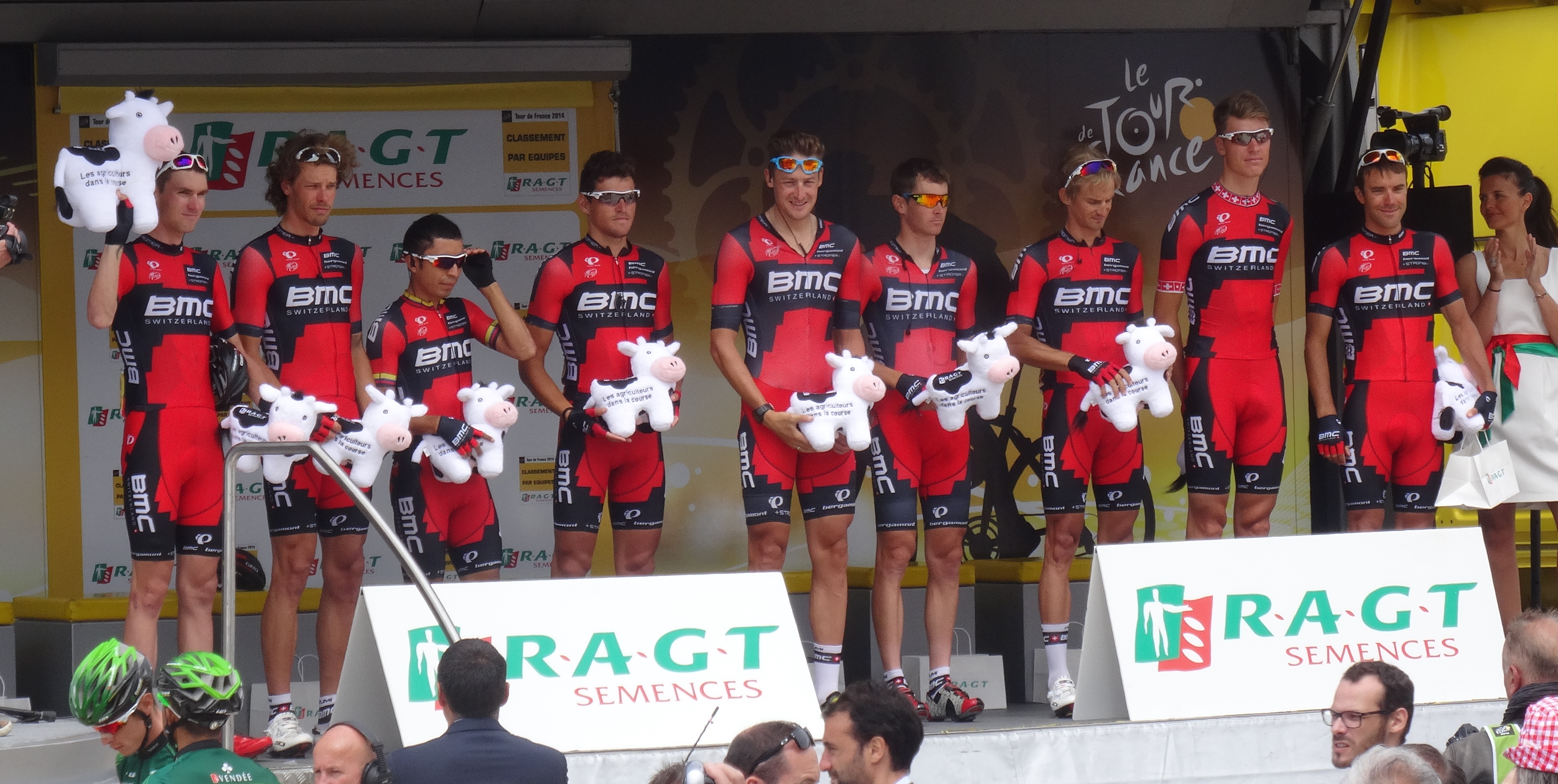
The BMC Racing Team before the start of the fourth stage in Le Touquet-Paris-Plage

UCI ProTeams

- Team Sky (riders)
- Movistar Team (riders)
- Team Katusha (riders)
- Tinkoff–Saxo (riders)
- Astana (riders)
- Cannondale (riders)
- Belkin Pro Cycling (riders)
- Omega Pharma–Quick-Step (riders)
- Ag2r–La Mondiale (riders)
- Garmin–Sharp (riders)
- Giant–Shimano (riders)
- Lampre–Merida (riders)
- FDJ.fr (riders)
- Lotto–Belisol (riders)
- BMC Racing Team (riders)
- Team Europcar (riders)
- Trek Factory Racing (riders)
- Orica–GreenEDGE (riders)

UCI Professional Continental teams

- Cofidis (riders)
- IAM Cycling (riders)
- NetApp–Endura (riders)
- Bretagne–Séché Environnement (riders)

== Cyclists ==
Legend
No.	Starting number worn by the rider during the Tour
Pos.	Position in the general classification
Time	Deficit to the winner of the general classification
‡	Denotes riders born on or after 1 January 1989 eligible for the young rider classification
A yellow jersey.	Denotes the winner of the general classification
A green jersey.	Denotes the winner of the points classification
A white jersey with red polka dots.	Denotes the winner of the mountains classification
A white jersey.	Denotes the winner of the young rider classification (eligibility indicated by ‡)
A white jersey with a yellow number bib.	Denotes riders that represent the winner of the team classification
A white jersey with a red number bib.	Denotes the winner of the super-combativity award
DNS	Denotes a rider who did not start a stage, followed by the stage before which he withdrew
DNF	Denotes a rider who did not finish a stage, followed by the stage in which he withdrew
DSQ	Denotes a rider who was disqualified from the race, followed by the stage in which this occurred
HD	Denotes a rider who finished outside the time limit, followed by the stage in which he did so (French: Hors delai)
Age correct as of 5 July 2014, the date on which the Tour began

=== By starting number ===
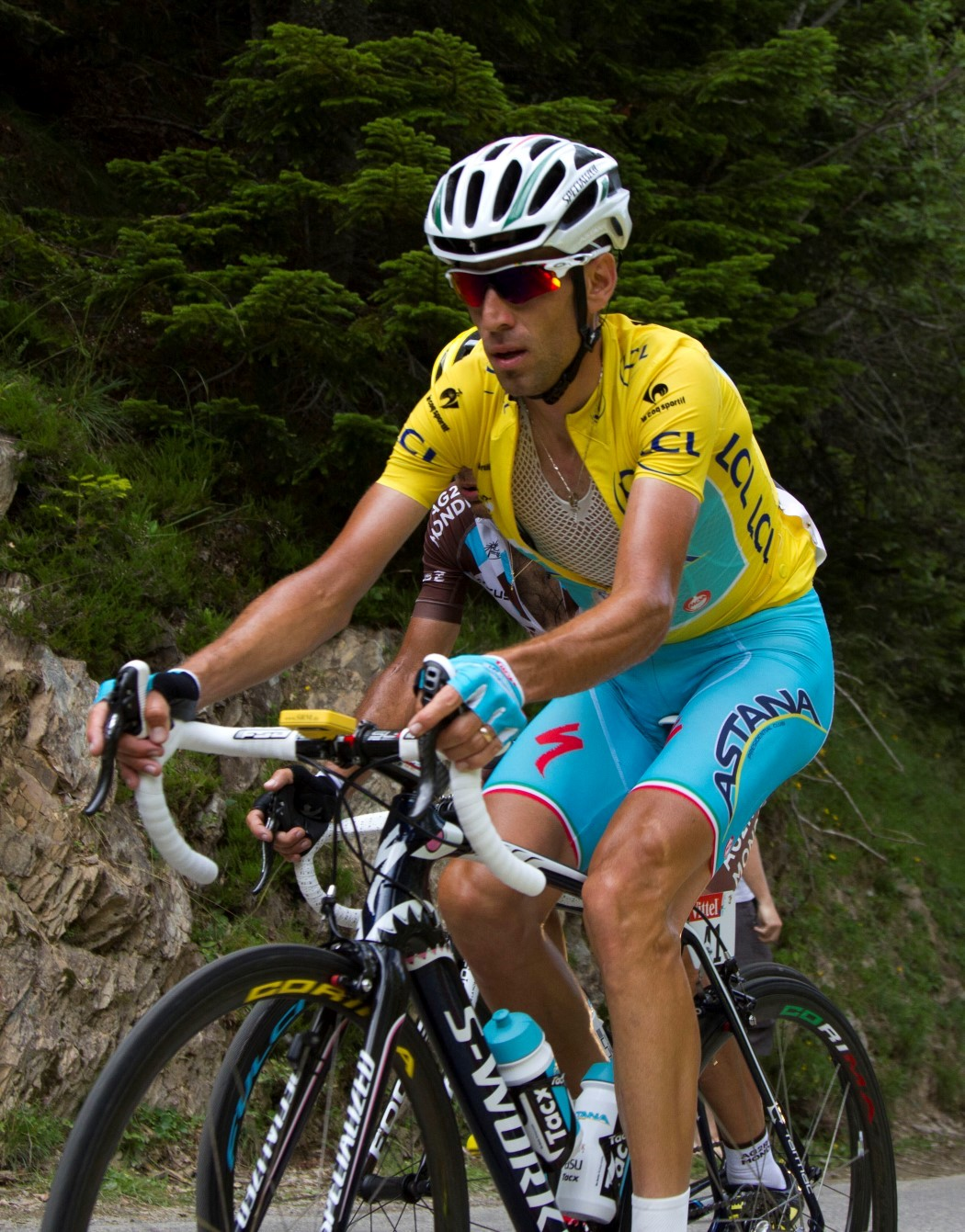
Astana rider Vincenzo Nibali won the general classification.

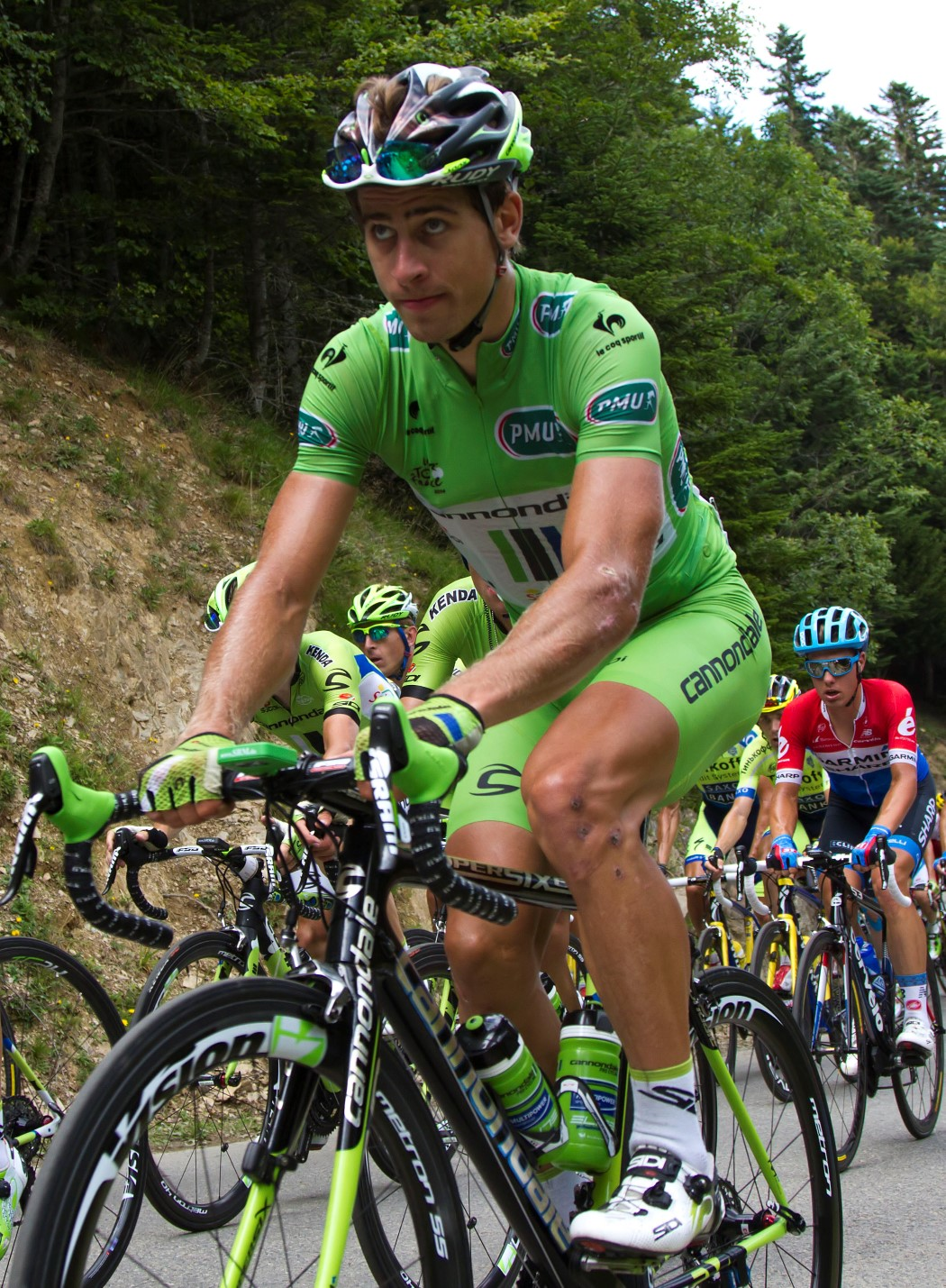
Cannondale rider Peter Sagan won the points classification.

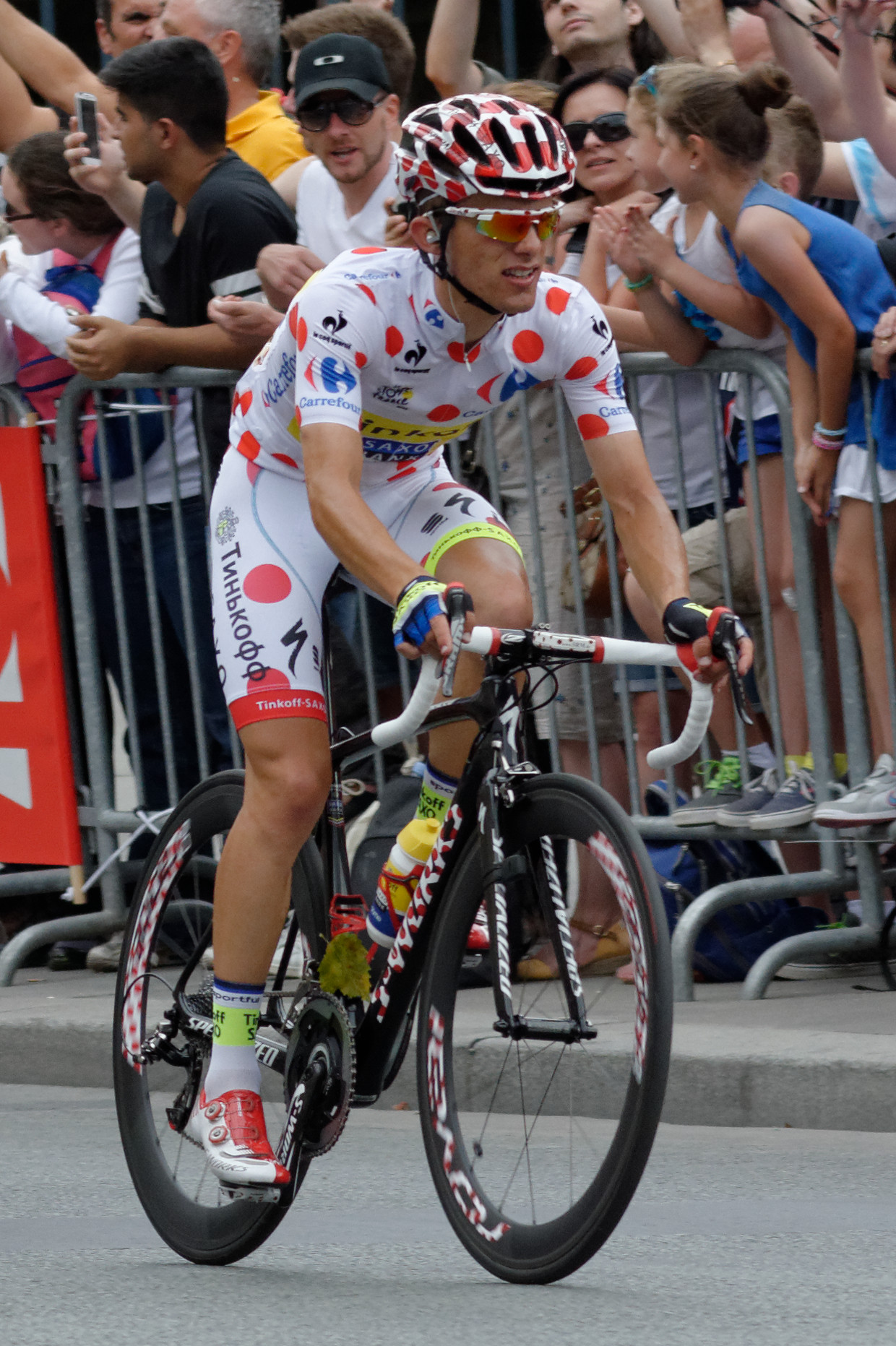
Tinkoff–Saxo rider Rafał Majka won the mountains classification.

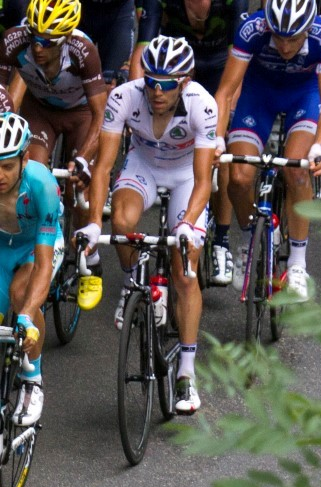
FDJ.fr rider Thibaut Pinot won the young rider classification.

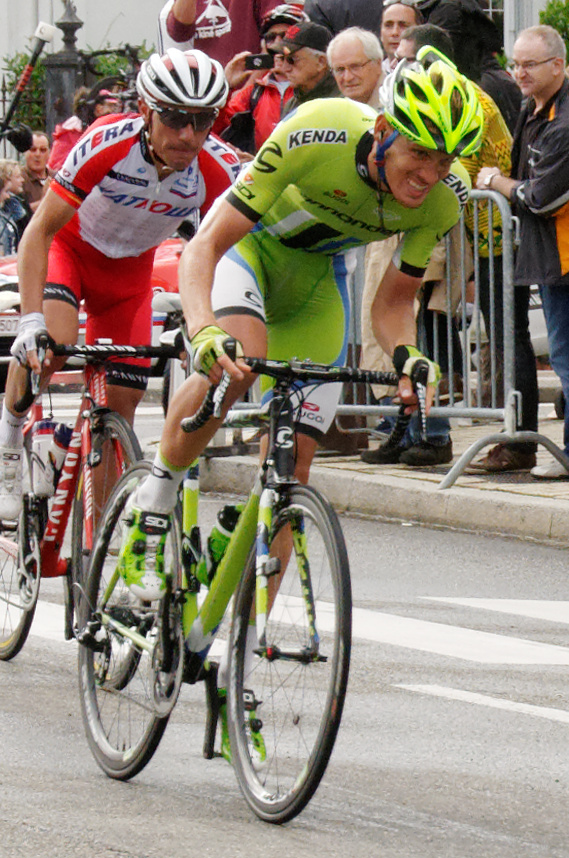
Cannondale rider Alessandro De Marchi won the super-combativity award.

No.	Name	Nationality	Team	Age	Pos.	Time	Ref
1	Chris Froome	Great Britain	Team Sky	29	DNF-5	—	
2	Bernhard Eisel	Austria	Team Sky	33	126	+ 4h 13' 21"	
3	Vasil Kiryienka	Belarus	Team Sky	33	86	+ 3h 30' 23"	
4	David López	Spain	Team Sky	33	105	+ 3h 45' 13"	
5	Mikel Nieve	Spain	Team Sky	30	18	+ 46' 31"	
6	Danny Pate	United States	Team Sky	35	153	+ 4h 47' 52"	
7	Richie Porte	Australia	Team Sky	29	23	+ 1h 01' 08"	
8	Geraint Thomas	Great Britain	Team Sky	28	22	+ 59' 14"	
9	Xabier Zandio	Spain	Team Sky	37	DNF-6	—	
11	Alejandro Valverde	Spain	Movistar Team	34	4	+ 9' 40"	
12	Imanol Erviti	Spain	Movistar Team	30	81	+ 3h 22' 48"	
13	John Gadret	France	Movistar Team	35	19	+ 47' 30"	
14	Jesús Herrada ‡	Spain	Movistar Team	23	61	+ 2h 53' 18"	
15	Beñat Intxausti	Spain	Movistar Team	28	114	+ 3h 55' 53"	
16	Ion Izagirre ‡	Spain	Movistar Team	25	41	+ 2h 00' 50"	
17	Rubén Plaza	Spain	Movistar Team	34	91	+ 3h 38' 27"	
18	José Joaquín Rojas	Spain	Movistar Team	29	DSQ-18	—	
19	Giovanni Visconti	Italy	Movistar Team	31	37	+ 1h 56' 28"	
21	Joaquim Rodríguez	Spain	Team Katusha	35	54	+ 2h 45' 17"	
22	Vladimir Isaichev	Russia	Team Katusha	28	157	+ 4h 58' 30"	
23	Alexander Kristoff	Norway	Team Katusha	27	125	+ 4h 11' 46"	
24	Luca Paolini	Italy	Team Katusha	37	136	+ 4h 29' 43"	
25	Alexander Porsev	Russia	Team Katusha	28	HD-13	—	
26	Egor Silin	Russia	Team Katusha	26	DNF-6	—	
27	Gatis Smukulis	Latvia	Team Katusha	27	100	+ 3h 43' 25"	
28	Simon Špilak	Slovenia	Team Katusha	28	DNF-17	—	
29	Yuri Trofimov	Russia	Team Katusha	30	14	+ 36' 41"	
31	Alberto Contador	Spain	Tinkoff–Saxo	31	DNF-10	—	
32	Daniele Bennati	Italy	Tinkoff–Saxo	33	96	+ 3h 40' 46"	
33	Jesús Hernández	Spain	Tinkoff–Saxo	32	DNF-6	—	
34	Rafał Majka ‡	Poland	Tinkoff–Saxo	24	44	+ 2h 17' 53"	
35	Michael Mørkøv	Denmark	Tinkoff–Saxo	29	134	+ 4h 26' 29"	
36	Sérgio Paulinho	Portugal	Tinkoff–Saxo	34	89	+ 3h 36' 33"	
37	Nicolas Roche	Ireland	Tinkoff–Saxo	30	39	+ 1h 58' 45"	
38	Michael Rogers	Australia	Tinkoff–Saxo	34	26	+ 1h 17' 53"	
39	Matteo Tosatto	Italy	Tinkoff–Saxo	40	119	+ 4h 01' 53"	
41	Vincenzo Nibali	Italy	Astana	29	1	89h 59' 06"	
42	Jakob Fuglsang	Denmark	Astana	29	36	+ 1h 54' 50"	
43	Andriy Hrivko	Ukraine	Astana	30	95	+ 3h 39' 28"	
44	Dmitriy Gruzdev	Kazakhstan	Astana	28	130	+ 4h 22' 33"	
45	Maxim Iglinsky	Kazakhstan	Astana	33	129	+ 4h 22' 07"	
46	Tanel Kangert	Estonia	Astana	27	20	+ 52' 11"	
47	Michele Scarponi	Italy	Astana	34	49	+ 2h 31' 40"	
48	Alessandro Vanotti	Italy	Astana	33	147	+ 4h 42' 48"	
49	Lieuwe Westra	Netherlands	Astana	31	79	+ 3h 21' 04"	
51	Peter Sagan ‡	Slovakia	Cannondale	24	60	+ 2h 52' 52"	
52	Maciej Bodnar	Poland	Cannondale	29	112	+ 3h 52' 52"	
53	Alessandro De Marchi	Italy	Cannondale	28	52	+ 2h 34' 54"	
54	Ted King	United States	Cannondale	31	DNF-10	—	
55	Kristijan Koren	Slovenia	Cannondale	27	135	+ 4h 29' 14"	
56	Marco Marcato	Italy	Cannondale	30	80	+ 3h 21' 16"	
57	Jean-Marc Marino	France	Cannondale	30	160	+ 5h 03' 46"	
58	Fabio Sabatini	Italy	Cannondale	29	118	+ 4h 01' 21"	
59	Elia Viviani ‡	Italy	Cannondale	25	162	+ 5h 10' 40"	
61	Bauke Mollema	Netherlands	Belkin Pro Cycling	27	10	+ 21' 15"	
62	Lars Boom	Netherlands	Belkin Pro Cycling	28	97	+ 3h 41' 24"	
63	Stef Clement	Netherlands	Belkin Pro Cycling	31	DNF-7	—	
64	Steven Kruijswijk	Netherlands	Belkin Pro Cycling	27	15	+ 38' 15"	
65	Tom Leezer	Netherlands	Belkin Pro Cycling	28	133	+ 4h 24' 21"	
66	Bram Tankink	Netherlands	Belkin Pro Cycling	35	40	+ 1h 59' 02"	
67	Laurens ten Dam	Netherlands	Belkin Pro Cycling	33	9	+ 18' 11"	
68	Sep Vanmarcke	Belgium	Belkin Pro Cycling	25	106	+ 3h 45' 54"	
69	Maarten Wynants	Belgium	Belkin Pro Cycling	32	117	+ 4h 01' 09"	
71	Mark Cavendish	Great Britain	Omega Pharma–Quick-Step	29	DNS-2	—	
72	Jan Bakelants	Belgium	Omega Pharma–Quick-Step	28	24	+ 1h 06' 28"	
73	Michał Gołaś	Poland	Omega Pharma–Quick-Step	30	55	+ 2h 49' 03"	
74	Michał Kwiatkowski ‡	Poland	Omega Pharma–Quick-Step	24	28	+ 1h 21' 55"	
75	Tony Martin	Germany	Omega Pharma–Quick-Step	29	47	+ 2h 25' 35"	
76	Alessandro Petacchi	Italy	Omega Pharma–Quick-Step	40	148	+ 4h 44' 47"	
77	Mark Renshaw	Australia	Omega Pharma–Quick-Step	31	142	+ 4h 39' 03"	
78	Niki Terpstra	Netherlands	Omega Pharma–Quick-Step	30	94	+ 3h 39' 04"	
79	Matteo Trentin ‡	Italy	Omega Pharma–Quick-Step	24	93	+ 3h 38' 56"	
81	Jean-Christophe Péraud	France	Ag2r–La Mondiale	37	2	+ 7' 37"	
82	Romain Bardet ‡	France	Ag2r–La Mondiale	24	6	+ 11' 26"	
83	Mikaël Cherel	France	Ag2r–La Mondiale	28	59	+ 2h 52' 00"	
84	Samuel Dumoulin	France	Ag2r–La Mondiale	33	90	+ 3h 38' 04"	
85	Ben Gastauer	Luxembourg	Ag2r–La Mondiale	26	21	+ 58' 00"	
86	Blel Kadri	France	Ag2r–La Mondiale	27	84	+ 3h 26' 23"	
87	Sébastien Minard	France	Ag2r–La Mondiale	32	99	+ 3h 42' 23"	
88	Matteo Montaguti	Italy	Ag2r–La Mondiale	30	66	+ 2h 55' 47"	
89	Christophe Riblon	France	Ag2r–La Mondiale	33	120	+ 4h 04' 00"	
91	Andrew Talansky	United States	Garmin–Sharp	25	DNS-12	—	
92	Janier Acevedo	Colombia	Garmin–Sharp	28	DNF-13	—	
93	Jack Bauer	New Zealand	Garmin–Sharp	29	137	+ 4h 29' 57"	
94	Alex Howes	United States	Garmin–Sharp	26	127	+ 4h 18' 43"	
95	Ben King ‡	United States	Garmin–Sharp	25	53	+ 2h 41' 59"	
96	Sebastian Langeveld	Netherlands	Garmin–Sharp	29	140	+ 4h 34' 29"	
97	Ramūnas Navardauskas	Lithuania	Garmin–Sharp	26	141	+ 4h 37' 42"	
98	Tom-Jelte Slagter ‡	Netherlands	Garmin–Sharp	25	56	+ 2h 49' 20"	
99	Johan Vansummeren	Belgium	Garmin–Sharp	33	74	+ 3h 08' 40"	
101	Marcel Kittel	Germany	Giant–Shimano	26	161	+ 5h 06' 27"	
102	Roy Curvers	Netherlands	Giant–Shimano	34	116	+ 3h 58' 23"	
103	Koen de Kort	Netherlands	Giant–Shimano	31	92	+ 3h 38' 52"	
104	John Degenkolb ‡	Germany	Giant–Shimano	25	123	+ 4h 06' 42"	
105	Dries Devenyns	Belgium	Giant–Shimano	30	DNF-14	—	
106	Tom Dumoulin ‡	Netherlands	Giant–Shimano	23	33	+ 1h 48' 00"	
107	Ji Cheng	China	Giant–Shimano	26	164	+ 6h 02' 24"	
108	Albert Timmer	Netherlands	Giant–Shimano	29	146	+ 4h 42' 28"	
109	Tom Veelers	Netherlands	Giant–Shimano	29	155	+ 4h 53' 23"	
111	Rui Costa	Portugal	Lampre–Merida	27	DNS-16	—	
112	Davide Cimolai ‡	Italy	Lampre–Merida	24	163	+ 5h 11' 58"	
113	Kristijan Đurasek	Croatia	Lampre–Merida	26	46	+ 2h 21' 18"	
114	Chris Horner	United States	Lampre–Merida	42	17	+ 44' 31"	
115	Sacha Modolo	Italy	Lampre–Merida	27	DNF-2	—	
116	Nelson Oliveira ‡	Portugal	Lampre–Merida	25	87	+ 3h 30' 36"	
117	Maximiliano Richeze	Argentina	Lampre–Merida	31	DNS-6	—	
118	José Serpa	Colombia	Lampre–Merida	35	48	+ 2h 29' 06"	
119	Rafael Valls	Spain	Lampre–Merida	27	DNF-14	—	
121	Arnaud Démare ‡	France	FDJ.fr	22	159	+ 5h 00' 29"	
122	William Bonnet	France	FDJ.fr	32	158	+ 4h 59' 57"	
123	Mickaël Delage	France	FDJ.fr	28	143	+ 4h 39' 40"	
124	Arnold Jeannesson	France	FDJ.fr	28	30	+ 1h 33' 27"	
125	Mathieu Ladagnous	France	FDJ.fr	29	76	+ 3h 14' 41"	
126	Cédric Pineau	France	FDJ.fr	29	102	+ 3h 44' 22"	
127	Thibaut Pinot ‡	France	FDJ.fr	24	3	+ 8' 15"	
128	Jérémy Roy	France	FDJ.fr	31	57	+ 2h 49' 28"	
129	Arthur Vichot	France	FDJ.fr	25	DNF-13	—	
131	Jurgen Van den Broeck	Belgium	Lotto–Belisol	31	13	+ 34' 01"	
132	Lars Bak	Denmark	Lotto–Belisol	34	82	+ 3h 23' 41"	
133	Bart De Clercq	Belgium	Lotto–Belisol	27	DNF-8	—	
134	Tony Gallopin	France	Lotto–Belisol	26	29	+ 1h 29' 24"	
135	André Greipel	Germany	Lotto–Belisol	31	149	+ 4h 44' 54"	
136	Adam Hansen	Australia	Lotto–Belisol	33	64	+ 2h 54' 18"	
137	Greg Henderson	New Zealand	Lotto–Belisol	37	DNF-4	—	
138	Jürgen Roelandts	Belgium	Lotto–Belisol	29	111	+ 3h 52' 39"	
139	Marcel Sieberg	Germany	Lotto–Belisol	32	145	+ 4h 41' 21"	
141	Tejay van Garderen	United States	BMC Racing Team	25	5	+ 11' 24"	
142	Darwin Atapuma	Colombia	BMC Racing Team	26	DNF-7	—	
143	Marcus Burghardt	Germany	BMC Racing Team	31	154	+ 4h 48' 40"	
144	Amaël Moinard	France	BMC Racing Team	32	45	+ 2h 19' 13"	
145	Daniel Oss	Italy	BMC Racing Team	27	69	+ 2h 58' 41"	
146	Michael Schär	Switzerland	BMC Racing Team	27	43	+ 2h 09' 43"	
147	Peter Stetina	United States	BMC Racing Team	26	35	+ 1h 52' 36"	
148	Greg Van Avermaet	Belgium	BMC Racing Team	29	38	+ 1h 56' 34"	
149	Peter Velits	Slovakia	BMC Racing Team	29	27	+ 1h 19' 38"	
151	Pierre Rolland	France	Team Europcar	27	11	+ 23' 07"	
152	Yukiya Arashiro	Japan	Team Europcar	29	65	+ 2h 55' 27"	
153	Bryan Coquard ‡	France	Team Europcar	22	104	+ 3h 44' 45"	
154	Cyril Gautier	France	Team Europcar	26	25	+ 1h 08' 47"	
155	Yohann Gène	France	Team Europcar	33	128	+ 4h 19' 11"	
156	Alexandre Pichot	France	Team Europcar	31	107	+ 3h 46' 35"	
157	Perrig Quéméneur	France	Team Europcar	30	83	+ 3h 25' 46"	
158	Kévin Reza	France	Team Europcar	26	73	+ 3h 08' 12"	
159	Thomas Voeckler	France	Team Europcar	35	42	+ 2h 08' 38"	
161	Fränk Schleck	Luxembourg	Trek Factory Racing	34	12	+ 25' 48"	
162	Matthew Busche	United States	Trek Factory Racing	29	98	+ 3h 41' 58"	
163	Fabian Cancellara	Switzerland	Trek Factory Racing	33	DNS-11	—	
164	Markel Irizar	Spain	Trek Factory Racing	34	63	+ 2h 53' 44"	
165	Grégory Rast	Switzerland	Trek Factory Racing	34	101	+ 3h 43' 37"	
166	Andy Schleck	Luxembourg	Trek Factory Racing	29	DNS-4	—	
167	Danny van Poppel ‡	Netherlands	Trek Factory Racing	20	DNF-7	—	
168	Jens Voigt	Germany	Trek Factory Racing	42	108	+ 3h 46' 37"	
169	Haimar Zubeldia	Spain	Trek Factory Racing	37	8	+ 17' 57"	
171	Daniel Navarro	Spain	Cofidis	30	DNF-13	—	
172	Nicolas Edet	France	Cofidis	26	77	+ 3h 19' 34"	
173	Egoitz García	Spain	Cofidis	28	DNF-9	—	
174	Cyril Lemoine	France	Cofidis	31	110	+ 3h 47' 16"	
175	Luis Ángel Maté	Spain	Cofidis	30	31	+ 1h 36' 52"	
176	Rudy Molard ‡	France	Cofidis	24	51	+ 2h 34' 22"	
177	Adrien Petit ‡	France	Cofidis	23	156	+ 4h 58' 20"	
178	Julien Simon	France	Cofidis	28	109	+ 3h 46' 56"	
179	Rein Taaramäe	Estonia	Cofidis	27	88	+ 3h 35' 01"	
181	Simon Gerrans	Australia	Orica–GreenEDGE	34	DNS-17	—	
182	Michael Albasini	Switzerland	Orica–GreenEDGE	33	70	+ 3h 05' 51"	
183	Simon Clarke	Australia	Orica–GreenEDGE	27	113	+ 3h 55' 38"	
184	Luke Durbridge ‡	Australia	Orica–GreenEDGE	23	122	+ 4h 05' 59"	
185	Mathew Hayman	Australia	Orica–GreenEDGE	36	DNF-10	—	
186	Jens Keukeleire	Belgium	Orica–GreenEDGE	25	67	+ 2h 56' 12"	
187	Christian Meier	Canada	Orica–GreenEDGE	29	121	+ 4h 05' 13"	
188	Svein Tuft	Canada	Orica–GreenEDGE	37	131	+ 4h 22' 52"	
189	Simon Yates ‡	Great Britain	Orica–GreenEDGE	21	DNS-16	—	
191	Mathias Frank	Switzerland	IAM Cycling	27	DNS-8	—	
192	Sylvain Chavanel	France	IAM Cycling	35	34	+ 1h 48' 13"	
193	Martin Elmiger	Switzerland	IAM Cycling	35	75	+ 3h 12' 10"	
194	Heinrich Haussler	Australia	IAM Cycling	30	DNF-18	—	
195	Reto Hollenstein	Switzerland	IAM Cycling	28	DNS-17	—	
196	Roger Kluge	Germany	IAM Cycling	28	139	+ 4h 33' 45"	
197	Jérôme Pineau	France	IAM Cycling	34	58	+ 2h 51' 46"	
198	Sébastien Reichenbach ‡	Switzerland	IAM Cycling	25	85	+ 3h 27' 52"	
199	Marcel Wyss	Switzerland	IAM Cycling	28	32	+ 1h 38' 27"	
201	Leopold König	Czech Republic	NetApp–Endura	26	7	+ 14' 32"	
202	Jan Bárta	Czech Republic	NetApp–Endura	29	71	+ 3h 07' 18"	
203	David de la Cruz ‡	Spain	NetApp–Endura	25	DNF-12	—	
204	Zak Dempster	Australia	NetApp–Endura	26	151	+ 4h 45' 04"	
205	Bartosz Huzarski	Poland	NetApp–Endura	33	68	+ 2h 58' 00"	
206	Tiago Machado	Portugal	NetApp–Endura	28	72	+ 3h 08' 03"	
207	José Mendes	Portugal	NetApp–Endura	29	124	+ 4h 07' 34"	
208	Andreas Schillinger	Germany	NetApp–Endura	30	144	+ 4h 40' 06"	
209	Paul Voss	Germany	NetApp–Endura	28	50	+ 2h 32' 48"	
211	Brice Feillu	France	Bretagne–Séché Environnement	28	16	+ 43' 59"	
212	Jean-Marc Bideau	France	Bretagne–Séché Environnement	30	115	+ 3h 58' 08"	
213	Anthony Delaplace ‡	France	Bretagne–Séché Environnement	24	78	+ 3h 20' 48"	
214	Romain Feillu	France	Bretagne–Séché Environnement	30	150	+ 4h 45' 04"	
215	Armindo Fonseca ‡	France	Bretagne–Séché Environnement	25	138	+ 4h 30' 52"	
216	Arnaud Gérard	France	Bretagne–Séché Environnement	29	132	+ 4h 24' 15"	
217	Florian Guillou	France	Bretagne–Séché Environnement	31	62	+ 2h 53' 20"	
218	Benoît Jarrier ‡	France	Bretagne–Séché Environnement	25	152	+ 4h 46' 28"	
219	Florian Vachon	France	Bretagne–Séché Environnement	29	103	+ 3h 44' 40"	

=== By team ===
Team Sky (SKY)
No.	Rider	Pos.
1	Chris Froome (GBR)	DNF-5
2	Bernhard Eisel (AUT)	126
3	Vasil Kiryienka (BLR)	86
4	David López (ESP)	105
5	Mikel Nieve (ESP)	18
6	Danny Pate (USA)	153
7	Richie Porte (AUS)	23
8	Geraint Thomas (GBR)	22
9	Xabier Zandio (ESP)	DNF-6
Directeur sportif: Nicolas Portal

Movistar Team (MOV)
No.	Rider	Pos.
11	Alejandro Valverde (ESP)	4
12	Imanol Erviti (ESP)	81
13	John Gadret (FRA)	19
14	Jesús Herrada (ESP) ‡	61
15	Beñat Intxausti (ESP)	114
16	Ion Izagirre (ESP) ‡	41
17	Rubén Plaza (ESP)	91
18	José Joaquín Rojas (ESP)	DSQ-18
19	Giovanni Visconti (ITA)	37
Directeur sportif: José Luis Arrieta

Team Katusha (KAT)
No.	Rider	Pos.
21	Joaquim Rodríguez (ESP)	54
22	Vladimir Isaichev (RUS)	157
23	Alexander Kristoff (NOR)	125
24	Luca Paolini (ITA)	136
25	Alexander Porsev (RUS)	HD-13
26	Egor Silin (RUS)	DNF-6
27	Gatis Smukulis (LAT)	100
28	Simon Špilak (SLO)	DNF-17
29	Yuri Trofimov (RUS)	14
Directeur sportif: José Azevedo

Tinkoff–Saxo (SAX)
No.	Rider	Pos.
31	Alberto Contador (ESP)	DNF-10
32	Daniele Bennati (ITA)	96
33	Jesús Hernández (ESP)	DNF-6
34	Rafał Majka (POL) ‡	44
35	Michael Mørkøv (DEN)	134
36	Sérgio Paulinho (POR)	89
37	Nicolas Roche (IRL)	39
38	Michael Rogers (AUS)	26
39	Matteo Tosatto (ITA)	119
Directeur sportif: Steven de Jongh

Astana (AST)
No.	Rider	Pos.
41	Vincenzo Nibali (ITA)	1
42	Jakob Fuglsang (DEN)	36
43	Andriy Hrivko (UKR)	95
44	Dmitriy Gruzdev (KAZ)	130
45	Maxim Iglinsky (KAZ)	129
46	Tanel Kangert (EST)	20
47	Michele Scarponi (ITA)	49
48	Alessandro Vanotti (ITA)	147
49	Lieuwe Westra (NED)	79
Directeur sportif: Alexandr Shefer

Cannondale (CAN)
No.	Rider	Pos.
51	Peter Sagan (SVK) ‡	60
52	Maciej Bodnar (POL)	112
53	Alessandro De Marchi (ITA)	52
54	Ted King (USA)	DNF-10
55	Kristijan Koren (SLO)	135
56	Marco Marcato (ITA)	80
57	Jean-Marc Marino (FRA)	160
58	Fabio Sabatini (ITA)	118
59	Elia Viviani (ITA) ‡	162
Directeur sportif: Gilles Pauchard

Belkin Pro Cycling (BEL)
No.	Rider	Pos.
61	Bauke Mollema (NED)	10
62	Lars Boom (NED)	97
63	Stef Clement (NED)	DNF-7
64	Steven Kruijswijk (NED)	15
65	Tom Leezer (NED)	133
66	Bram Tankink (NED)	40
67	Laurens ten Dam (NED)	9
68	Sep Vanmarcke (BEL)	160
69	Maarten Wynants (BEL)	117
Directeur sportif: Nico Verhoeven

Omega Pharma–Quick-Step (OPQ)
No.	Rider	Pos.
71	Mark Cavendish (GBR)	DNS-2
72	Jan Bakelants (BEL)	24
73	Michał Gołaś (POL)	55
74	Michał Kwiatkowski (POL) ‡	28
75	Tony Martin (GER)	47
76	Alessandro Petacchi (ITA)	148
77	Mark Renshaw (AUS)	142
78	Niki Terpstra (NED)	94
79	Matteo Trentin (ITA) ‡	93
Directeur sportif: Wilfried Peeters

Ag2r–La Mondiale (ALM)
No.	Rider	Pos.
81	Jean-Christophe Péraud (FRA)	2
82	Romain Bardet (FRA) ‡	7
83	Mikaël Cherel (FRA)	59
84	Samuel Dumoulin (FRA)	90
85	Ben Gastauer (LUX)	21
86	Blel Kadri (FRA)	84
87	Sébastien Minard (FRA)	99
88	Matteo Montaguti (ITA)	66
89	Christophe Riblon (FRA)	120
Directeur sportif: Vincent Lavenu

Garmin–Sharp (GRS)
No.	Rider	Pos.
91	Andrew Talansky (USA)	DNS-12
92	Janier Acevedo (COL)	DNF-13
93	Jack Bauer (NZL)	137
94	Alex Howes (USA)	127
95	Ben King (USA) ‡	53
96	Sebastian Langeveld (NED)	140
97	Ramūnas Navardauskas (LTU)	141
98	Tom-Jelte Slagter (NED) ‡	56
99	Johan Vansummeren (BEL)	74
Directeur sportif: Charly Wegelius

Giant–Shimano (GIA)
No.	Rider	Pos.
101	Marcel Kittel (GER)	161
102	Roy Curvers (NED)	116
103	Koen de Kort (NED)	92
104	John Degenkolb (GER) ‡	123
105	Dries Devenyns (BEL)	DNF-14
106	Tom Dumoulin (NED) ‡	33
107	Ji Cheng (CHN)	164
108	Albert Timmer (NED)	146
109	Tom Veelers (NED)	155
Directeur sportif: Marc Reef

Lampre–Merida (LAM)
No.	Rider	Pos.
111	Rui Costa (POR)	DNS-16
112	Davide Cimolai (ITA) ‡	163
113	Kristijan Đurasek (CRO)	46
114	Chris Horner (USA)	17
115	Sacha Modolo (ITA)	DNF-2
116	Nelson Oliveira (POR) ‡	87
117	Maximiliano Richeze (ARG)	DNS-16
118	José Serpa (COL)	48
119	Rafael Valls (ESP)	DNF-14
Directeur sportif: Simone Pedrazzini

FDJ.fr (FDJ)
No.	Rider	Pos.
121	Arnaud Démare (FRA) ‡	159
122	William Bonnet (FRA)	158
123	Mickaël Delage (FRA)	143
124	Arnold Jeannesson (FRA)	30
125	Mathieu Ladagnous (FRA)	76
126	Cédric Pineau (FRA)	102
127	Thibaut Pinot (FRA) ‡	3
128	Jérémy Roy (FRA)	57
129	Arthur Vichot (FRA)	DNF-13
Directeur sportif: Thierry Bricaud

Lotto–Belisol (LTB)
No.	Rider	Pos.
131	Jurgen Van den Broeck (BEL)	13
132	Lars Bak (DEN)	82
133	Bart De Clercq (BEL)	DNF-8
134	Tony Gallopin (FRA)	29
135	André Greipel (GER)	149
136	Adam Hansen (AUS)	64
137	Greg Henderson (NZL)	DNF-4
138	Jürgen Roelandts (BEL)	111
139	Marcel Sieberg (GER)	145
Directeur sportif: Herman Frison

BMC Racing Team (BMC)
No.	Rider	Pos.
141	Tejay van Garderen (USA)	5
142	Darwin Atapuma (COL)	DNF-7
143	Marcus Burghardt (GER)	154
144	Amaël Moinard (FRA)	45
145	Daniel Oss (ITA)	69
146	Michael Schär (SUI)	43
147	Peter Stetina (USA)	35
148	Greg Van Avermaet (BEL)	38
149	Peter Velits (SVK)	27
Directeur sportif: Yvon Ledanois

Team Europcar (EUC)
No.	Rider	Pos.
151	Pierre Rolland (FRA)	11
152	Yukiya Arashiro (JPN)	65
153	Bryan Coquard (FRA) ‡	104
154	Cyril Gautier (FRA)	25
155	Yohann Gène (FRA)	128
156	Alexandre Pichot (FRA)	107
157	Perrig Quéméneur (FRA)	83
158	Kévin Reza (FRA)	73
159	Thomas Voeckler (FRA)	42
Directeur sportif: Andy Flickinger

Trek Factory Racing (TFR)
No.	Rider	Pos.
161	Fränk Schleck (LUX)	12
162	Matthew Busche (USA)	98
163	Fabian Cancellara (SUI)	DNS-11
164	Markel Irizar (ESP)	63
165	Grégory Rast (SUI)	101
166	Andy Schleck (LUX)	DNS-4
167	Danny van Poppel (NED) ‡	DNF-7
168	Jens Voigt (GER)	108
169	Haimar Zubeldia (ESP)	8
Directeur sportif: Kim Andersen

Cofidis (COF)
No.	Rider	Pos.
171	Daniel Navarro (ESP)	DNF-13
172	Nicolas Edet (FRA)	77
173	Egoitz García (ESP)	DNF-9
174	Cyril Lemoine (FRA)	110
175	Luis Ángel Maté (ESP)	31
176	Rudy Molard (FRA) ‡	51
177	Adrien Petit (FRA) ‡	156
178	Julien Simon (FRA)	109
179	Rein Taaramäe (EST)	88
Directeur sportif: Didier Rous

Orica–GreenEDGE (OGE)
No.	Rider	Pos.
181	Simon Gerrans (AUS)	DNS-17
182	Michael Albasini (SUI)	70
183	Simon Clarke (AUS)	113
184	Luke Durbridge (AUS) ‡	122
185	Mathew Hayman (AUS)	DNF-10
186	Jens Keukeleire (BEL)	67
187	Christian Meier (CAN)	121
188	Svein Tuft (CAN)	131
189	Simon Yates (GBR)	DNS-16
Directeur sportif: Matthew White

IAM Cycling (IAM)
No.	Rider	Pos.
191	Mathias Frank (SUI)	DNS-8
192	Sylvain Chavanel (FRA)	34
193	Martin Elmiger (SUI)	75
194	Heinrich Haussler (AUS)	DNF-18
195	Reto Hollenstein (SUI)	DNS-17
196	Roger Kluge (GER)	139
197	Jérôme Pineau (FRA)	58
198	Sébastien Reichenbach (SUI) ‡	85
199	Marcel Wyss (SUI)	32
Directeur sportif: Eddy Seigneur

NetApp–Endura (TNE)
No.	Rider	Pos.
201	Leopold König (CZE)	7
202	Jan Bárta (CZE)	71
203	David de la Cruz (ESP) ‡	DNF-12
204	Zak Dempster (AUS)	151
205	Bartosz Huzarski (POL)	68
206	Tiago Machado (POR)	72
207	José Mendes (POR)	124
208	Andreas Schillinger (GER)	144
209	Paul Voss (GER)	50
Directeur sportif: Enrico Poitschke

Bretagne–Séché Environnement (BSE)
No.	Rider	Pos.
211	Brice Feillu (FRA)	16
212	Jean-Marc Bideau (FRA)	115
213	Anthony Delaplace (FRA) ‡	78
214	Romain Feillu (FRA)	150
215	Armindo Fonseca (FRA) ‡	138
216	Arnaud Gérard (FRA)	132
217	Florian Guillou (FRA)	62
218	Benoît Jarrier (FRA) ‡	152
219	Florian Vachon (FRA)	103
Directeur sportif: Emmanuel Hubert

=== By nationality ===
Country	No. of riders	Finishers	Stage wins
Argentina	1	0	
Australia	10	7	1 (Michael Rogers)
Austria	1	1	
Belarus	1	1	
Belgium	10	8	
Canada	2	2	
China	1	1	
Colombia	3	1	
Croatia	1	1	
Czech Republic	2	2	
Denmark	3	3	
Estonia	2	2	
France	44	43	2 (Tony Gallopin, Blel Kadri)
Germany	10	10	7 (Marcel Kittel ×4, Tony Martin ×2, André Greipel)
Great Britain	4	1	
Ireland	1	1	
Italy	17	16	5 (Vincenzo Nibali ×4, Matteo Trentin)
Japan	1	1	
Kazakhstan	2	2	
Latvia	1	1	
Lithuania	1	1	1 (Ramūnas Navardauskas)
Luxembourg	3	2	
Netherlands	17	15	1 (Lars Boom)
New Zealand	2	1	
Norway	1	1	2 (Alexander Kristoff ×2)
Poland	5	5	2 (Rafał Majka ×2)
Portugal	5	4	
Russia	4	2	
Slovakia	2	2	
Slovenia	2	1	
Spain	20	12	
Switzerland	9	6	
Ukraine	1	1	
United States	9	7	
Total	198	164	21
