= List of teams and cyclists in the 2011 Tour de France =

The 2011 Tour de France was the 98th edition of the race, one of cycling's Grand Tours. It featured 22 cycling teams. Eighteen of the teams invited to the Tour were a part of the UCI World Tour, the other four teams are French Professional Continental teams. The Tour began with a stage from Passage du Gois to Mont des Alouettes on 2 July and finished on the Champs-Élysées in Paris on 24 July. Eighteen UCI World Tour teams have been invited and are obligated to participate in the 2011 Tour de France. 198 riders from 22 teams started the race at Passage du Gois. 167 of them completed the race at Champs-Élysées.

== Teams ==
UCI ProTeams

- Ag2r–La Mondiale
- Astana
- BMC Racing Team
- Euskaltel–Euskadi
- Garmin–Cervélo
- HTC–Highroad
- Team Katusha
- Lampre–ISD
- Leopard Trek
- Liquigas–Cannondale
- Movistar Team
- Omega Pharma–Lotto
- Quick-Step
- Rabobank
- Team RadioShack
- Saxo Bank–SunGard
- Team Sky
- Vacansoleil–DCM

UCI Professional Continental teams

- Cofidis
- Team Europcar
- FDJ
- Saur–Sojasun

== Cyclists ==
=== By rider ===
Legend
No.	Starting number worn by the rider during the Tour
‡	Denotes riders born on or after 1 January 1986 eligible for the Young rider classification
DNS	Denotes a rider who did not start, followed by the stage before which he withdrew
DNF	Denotes a rider who did not finish, followed by the stage in which he withdrew
HD	Denotes a rider finished outside the time limit, followed by the stage in which he did so
DSQ	Denotes a rider who was disqualified from the race, followed by the stage before which this occurred
Age correct as of 2 July 2011, the date on which the Tour began

No.	Name	Nationality	Team	Age	Pos.
1	Alberto Contador	Spain	Saxo Bank–SunGard	28	5
2	Jesús Hernández	Spain	Saxo Bank–SunGard	29	92
3	Daniel Navarro	Spain	Saxo Bank–SunGard	27	62
4	Benjamín Noval	Spain	Saxo Bank–SunGard	32	116
5	Richie Porte	Australia	Saxo Bank–SunGard	26	72
6	Chris Anker Sørensen	Denmark	Saxo Bank–SunGard	26	37
7	Nicki Sørensen	Denmark	Saxo Bank–SunGard	36	95
8	Matteo Tosatto	Italy	Saxo Bank–SunGard	37	123
9	Brian Vandborg	Denmark	Saxo Bank–SunGard	29	125
11	Andy Schleck	Luxembourg	Leopard Trek	26	2
12	Fabian Cancellara	Switzerland	Leopard Trek	30	119
13	Jakob Fuglsang	Denmark	Leopard Trek	26	50
14	Linus Gerdemann	Germany	Leopard Trek	28	60
15	Maxime Monfort	Belgium	Leopard Trek	28	29
16	Stuart O'Grady	Australia	Leopard Trek	37	78
17	Joost Posthuma	Netherlands	Leopard Trek	30	108
18	Fränk Schleck	Luxembourg	Leopard Trek	31	3
19	Jens Voigt	Germany	Leopard Trek	39	67
21	Samuel Sánchez	Spain	Euskaltel–Euskadi	33	6
22	Gorka Izagirre	Spain	Euskaltel–Euskadi	23‡	66
23	Egoi Martínez	Spain	Euskaltel–Euskadi	33	34
24	Alan Pérez	Spain	Euskaltel–Euskadi	28	94
25	Rubén Pérez	Spain	Euskaltel–Euskadi	29	75
26	Amets Txurruka	Spain	Euskaltel–Euskadi	28	DNF-9
27	Pablo Urtasun	Spain	Euskaltel–Euskadi	31	149
28	Iván Velasco	Spain	Euskaltel–Euskadi	31	DNS-6
29	Gorka Verdugo	Spain	Euskaltel–Euskadi	32	25
31	Jurgen Van den Broeck	Belgium	Omega Pharma–Lotto	28	DNF-9
32	Philippe Gilbert	Belgium	Omega Pharma–Lotto	28	38
33	André Greipel	Germany	Omega Pharma–Lotto	28	156
34	Sebastian Lang	Germany	Omega Pharma–Lotto	31	113
35	Jürgen Roelandts	Belgium	Omega Pharma–Lotto	26	85
36	Marcel Sieberg	Germany	Omega Pharma–Lotto	29	141
37	Jurgen Van de Walle	Belgium	Omega Pharma–Lotto	34	DNF-4
38	Jelle Vanendert	Belgium	Omega Pharma–Lotto	26	20
39	Frederik Willems	Belgium	Omega Pharma–Lotto	31	DNF-9
41	Robert Gesink	Netherlands	Rabobank	25‡	33
42	Carlos Barredo	Spain	Rabobank	30	35
43	Lars Boom	Netherlands	Rabobank	25	DNF-13
44	Juan Manuel Gárate	Spain	Rabobank	35	DNS-9
45	Bauke Mollema	Netherlands	Rabobank	24‡	70
46	Grischa Niermann	Germany	Rabobank	35	71
47	Luis León Sánchez	Spain	Rabobank	27	57
48	Laurens ten Dam	Netherlands	Rabobank	30	58
49	Maarten Tjallingii	Netherlands	Rabobank	33	99
51	Thor Hushovd	Norway	Garmin–Cervélo	33	68
52	Tom Danielson	United States	Garmin–Cervélo	33	9
53	Julian Dean	New Zealand	Garmin–Cervélo	36	145
54	Tyler Farrar	United States	Garmin–Cervélo	27	159
55	Ryder Hesjedal	Canada	Garmin–Cervélo	30	18
56	David Millar	Great Britain	Garmin–Cervélo	34	76
57	Ramūnas Navardauskas	Lithuania	Garmin–Cervélo	23‡	157
58	Christian Vande Velde	United States	Garmin–Cervélo	35	17
59	David Zabriskie	United States	Garmin–Cervélo	32	DNF-9
61	Alexander Vinokourov	Kazakhstan	Astana	37	DNF-9
62	Rémy Di Gregorio	France	Astana	25	39
63	Dmitry Fofonov	Kazakhstan	Astana	34	106
64	Andriy Hryvko	Ukraine	Astana	27	144
65	Maxim Iglinsky	Kazakhstan	Astana	30	105
66	Roman Kreuziger	Czech Republic	Astana	25‡	112
67	Paolo Tiralongo	Italy	Astana	33	DNF-17
68	Tomas Vaitkus	Lithuania	Astana	29	140
69	Andrey Zeits	Kazakhstan	Astana	24‡	45
71	Janez Brajkovič	Slovenia	Team RadioShack	27	DNF-5
72	Chris Horner	United States	Team RadioShack	39	DNS-8
73	Markel Irizar	Spain	Team RadioShack	31	84
74	Andreas Klöden	Germany	Team RadioShack	36	DNF-13
75	Levi Leipheimer	United States	Team RadioShack	37	32
76	Dimitry Muravyev	Kazakhstan	Team RadioShack	31	129
77	Sérgio Paulinho	Portugal	Team RadioShack	31	81
78	Yaroslav Popovych	Ukraine	Team RadioShack	31	DNS-10
79	Haimar Zubeldia	Spain	Team RadioShack	34	16
81	David Arroyo	Spain	Movistar Team	31	36
82	Andrey Amador	Costa Rica	Movistar Team	24‡	166
83	Rui Costa	Portugal	Movistar Team	24‡	90
84	Imanol Erviti	Spain	Movistar Team	27	88
85	Iván Gutiérrez	Spain	Movistar Team	32	102
86	Beñat Intxausti	Spain	Movistar Team	25‡	DNF-8
87	Vasil Kiryienka	Belarus	Movistar Team	30	HD-6
88	José Joaquín Rojas	Spain	Movistar Team	26	80
89	Francisco Ventoso	Spain	Movistar Team	29	139
91	Ivan Basso	Italy	Liquigas–Cannondale	33	8
92	Maciej Bodnar	Poland	Liquigas–Cannondale	26	143
93	Kristijan Koren	Slovenia	Liquigas–Cannondale	24‡	87
94	Paolo Longo Borghini	Italy	Liquigas–Cannondale	30	126
95	Daniel Oss	Italy	Liquigas–Cannondale	24‡	100
96	Maciej Paterski	Poland	Liquigas–Cannondale	24‡	69
97	Fabio Sabatini	Italy	Liquigas–Cannondale	26	167
98	Sylwester Szmyd	Poland	Liquigas–Cannondale	33	42
99	Alessandro Vanotti	Italy	Liquigas–Cannondale	30	133
101	Nicolas Roche	Ireland	Ag2r–La Mondiale	26	26
102	Maxime Bouet	France	Ag2r–La Mondiale	24‡	55
103	Hubert Dupont	France	Ag2r–La Mondiale	30	22
104	John Gadret	France	Ag2r–La Mondiale	32	DNF-11
105	Sébastien Hinault	France	Ag2r–La Mondiale	37	111
106	Blel Kadri	France	Ag2r–La Mondiale	24‡	117
107	Sébastien Minard	France	Ag2r–La Mondiale	29	110
108	Jean-Christophe Péraud	France	Ag2r–La Mondiale	34	10
109	Christophe Riblon	France	Ag2r–La Mondiale	30	51
111	Bradley Wiggins	Great Britain	Team Sky	31	DNF-7
112	Juan Antonio Flecha	Spain	Team Sky	33	98
113	Simon Gerrans	Australia	Team Sky	31	96
114	Edvald Boasson Hagen	Norway	Team Sky	24‡	53
115	Christian Knees	Germany	Team Sky	30	64
116	Ben Swift	Great Britain	Team Sky	23‡	137
117	Geraint Thomas	Great Britain	Team Sky	25‡	31
118	Rigoberto Urán	Colombia	Team Sky	24‡	24
119	Xabier Zandio	Spain	Team Sky	34	48
121	Sylvain Chavanel	France	Quick-Step	32	61
122	Tom Boonen	Belgium	Quick-Step	30	DNF-7
123	Gerald Ciolek	Germany	Quick-Step	24‡	150
124	Kevin De Weert	Belgium	Quick-Step	29	13
125	Dries Devenyns	Belgium	Quick-Step	27	46
126	Addy Engels	Netherlands	Quick-Step	34	146
127	Jérôme Pineau	France	Quick-Step	31	54
128	Gert Steegmans	Belgium	Quick-Step	30	DNS-13
129	Niki Terpstra	Netherlands	Quick-Step	27	134
131	Sandy Casar	France	FDJ	32	27
132	William Bonnet	France	FDJ	29	HD-14
133	Mickaël Delage	France	FDJ	25	132
134	Arnold Jeannesson	France	FDJ	25‡	15
135	Gianni Meersman	Belgium	FDJ	25	77
136	Rémi Pauriol	France	FDJ	29	DNF-7
137	Anthony Roux	France	FDJ	24‡	101
138	Jérémy Roy	France	FDJ	28	86
139	Arthur Vichot	France	FDJ	22‡	104
141	Cadel Evans	Australia	BMC Racing Team	34	1
142	Brent Bookwalter	United States	BMC Racing Team	27	114
143	Marcus Burghardt	Germany	BMC Racing Team	28	164
144	George Hincapie	United States	BMC Racing Team	38	56
145	Amaël Moinard	France	BMC Racing Team	29	65
146	Steve Morabito	Switzerland	BMC Racing Team	28	49
147	Manuel Quinziato	Italy	BMC Racing Team	31	115
148	Ivan Santaromita	Italy	BMC Racing Team	27	83
149	Michael Schär	Switzerland	BMC Racing Team	24‡	103
151	Rein Taaramäe	Estonia	Cofidis	24‡	12
152	Mickaël Buffaz	France	Cofidis	32	131
153	Samuel Dumoulin	France	Cofidis	30	162
154	Leonardo Duque	Colombia	Cofidis	31	121
155	Julien El Fares	France	Cofidis	26	40
156	Tony Gallopin	France	Cofidis	23‡	79
157	David Moncoutié	France	Cofidis	36	41
158	Tristan Valentin	France	Cofidis	29	118
159	Romain Zingle	Belgium	Cofidis	24‡	152
161	Damiano Cunego	Italy	Lampre–ISD	29	7
162	Leonardo Bertagnolli	Italy	Lampre–ISD	33	DNF-18
163	Grega Bole	Slovenia	Lampre–ISD	25	127
164	Matteo Bono	Italy	Lampre–ISD	27	93
165	Danilo Hondo	Germany	Lampre–ISD	37	109
166	Denys Kostyuk	Ukraine	Lampre–ISD	29	153
167	David Loosli	Switzerland	Lampre–ISD	31	59
168	Adriano Malori	Italy	Lampre–ISD	23‡	91
169	Alessandro Petacchi	Italy	Lampre–ISD	37	107
171	Mark Cavendish	Great Britain	HTC–Highroad	26	130
172	Lars Bak	Denmark	HTC–Highroad	31	154
173	Bernhard Eisel	Austria	HTC–Highroad	30	161
174	Matthew Goss	Australia	HTC–Highroad	24‡	142
175	Tony Martin	Germany	HTC–Highroad	26	44
176	Danny Pate	United States	HTC–Highroad	32	165
177	Mark Renshaw	Australia	HTC–Highroad	28	163
178	Tejay van Garderen	United States	HTC–Highroad	22‡	82
179	Peter Velits	Slovakia	HTC–Highroad	26	19
181	Thomas Voeckler	France	Team Europcar	32	4
182	Anthony Charteau	France	Team Europcar	32	52
183	Cyril Gautier	France	Team Europcar	23‡	43
184	Yohann Gène	France	Team Europcar	30	158
185	Vincent Jérôme	France	Team Europcar	26	155
186	Christophe Kern	France	Team Europcar	30	DNF-5
187	Perrig Quéméneur	France	Team Europcar	27	151
188	Pierre Rolland	France	Team Europcar	24‡	11
189	Sébastien Turgot	France	Team Europcar	27	120
191	Vladimir Karpets	Russia	Team Katusha	30	28
192	Pavel Brutt	Russia	Team Katusha	29	DNF-9
193	Denis Galimzyanov	Russia	Team Katusha	24‡	HD-12
194	Vladimir Gusev	Russia	Team Katusha	28	23
195	Mikhail Ignatiev	Russia	Team Katusha	26	147
196	Vladimir Isaichev	Russia	Team Katusha	25‡	DNF-13
197	Alexandr Kolobnev	Russia	Team Katusha	30	DNS-10
198	Egor Silin	Russia	Team Katusha	23‡	73
199	Yuri Trofimov	Russia	Team Katusha	27	30
201	Romain Feillu	France	Vacansoleil–DCM	27	DNS-12
202	Borut Božič	Slovenia	Vacansoleil–DCM	30	136
203	Thomas De Gendt	Belgium	Vacansoleil–DCM	24‡	63
204	Johnny Hoogerland	Netherlands	Vacansoleil–DCM	28	74
205	Björn Leukemans	Belgium	Vacansoleil–DCM	34	HD-19
206	Marco Marcato	Italy	Vacansoleil–DCM	27	89
207	Wout Poels	Netherlands	Vacansoleil–DCM	23‡	DNF-9
208	Rob Ruijgh	Netherlands	Vacansoleil–DCM	24‡	21
209	Lieuwe Westra	Netherlands	Vacansoleil–DCM	28	128
211	Jérôme Coppel	France	Saur–Sojasun	24‡	14
212	Arnaud Coyot	France	Saur–Sojasun	30	148
213	Anthony Delaplace	France	Saur–Sojasun	21‡	135
214	Jimmy Engoulvent	France	Saur–Sojasun	31	160
215	Jérémie Galland	France	Saur–Sojasun	28	138
216	Jonathan Hivert	France	Saur–Sojasun	26	97
217	Fabrice Jeandesboz	France	Saur–Sojasun	26	124
218	Laurent Mangel	France	Saur–Sojasun	30	122
219	Yannick Talabardon	France	Saur–Sojasun	29	47

=== By nationality ===
Country	No. of riders	Finishers	Stage wins
France	45	40	1 (Pierre Rolland)
Spain	26	22	2 (Luis León Sánchez, Samuel Sánchez)
Italy	15	13	0
Belgium	15	9	2 (Philippe Gilbert, Jelle Vanendert)
Germany	12	11	2 (André Greipel, Tony Martin)
Netherlands	12	10	0
United States	10	8	1 (Tyler Farrar)
Russia	9	5	0
Australia	6	6	1 (Cadel Evans)
Denmark	5	5	0
Great Britain	5	4	5 (Mark Cavendish ×5)
Kazakhstan	5	4	0
Slovenia	4	3	0
Switzerland	4	4	0
Poland	3	3	0
Ukraine	3	2	0
Luxembourg	2	2	1 (Andy Schleck)
Portugal	2	2	1 (Rui Costa)
Norway	2	2	4 (Edvald Boasson Hagen ×2, Thor Hushovd ×2)
Colombia	2	2	0
Lithuania	2	2	0
Czech Republic	1	1	0
Estonia	1	1	0
Ireland	1	1	0
Slovakia	1	1	0
Costa Rica	1	1	0
Canada	1	1	0
New Zealand	1	1	0
Austria	1	1	0
Belarus	1	0	0
Total	198	167	21
