= List of teams and cyclists in the 2013 Vuelta a España =

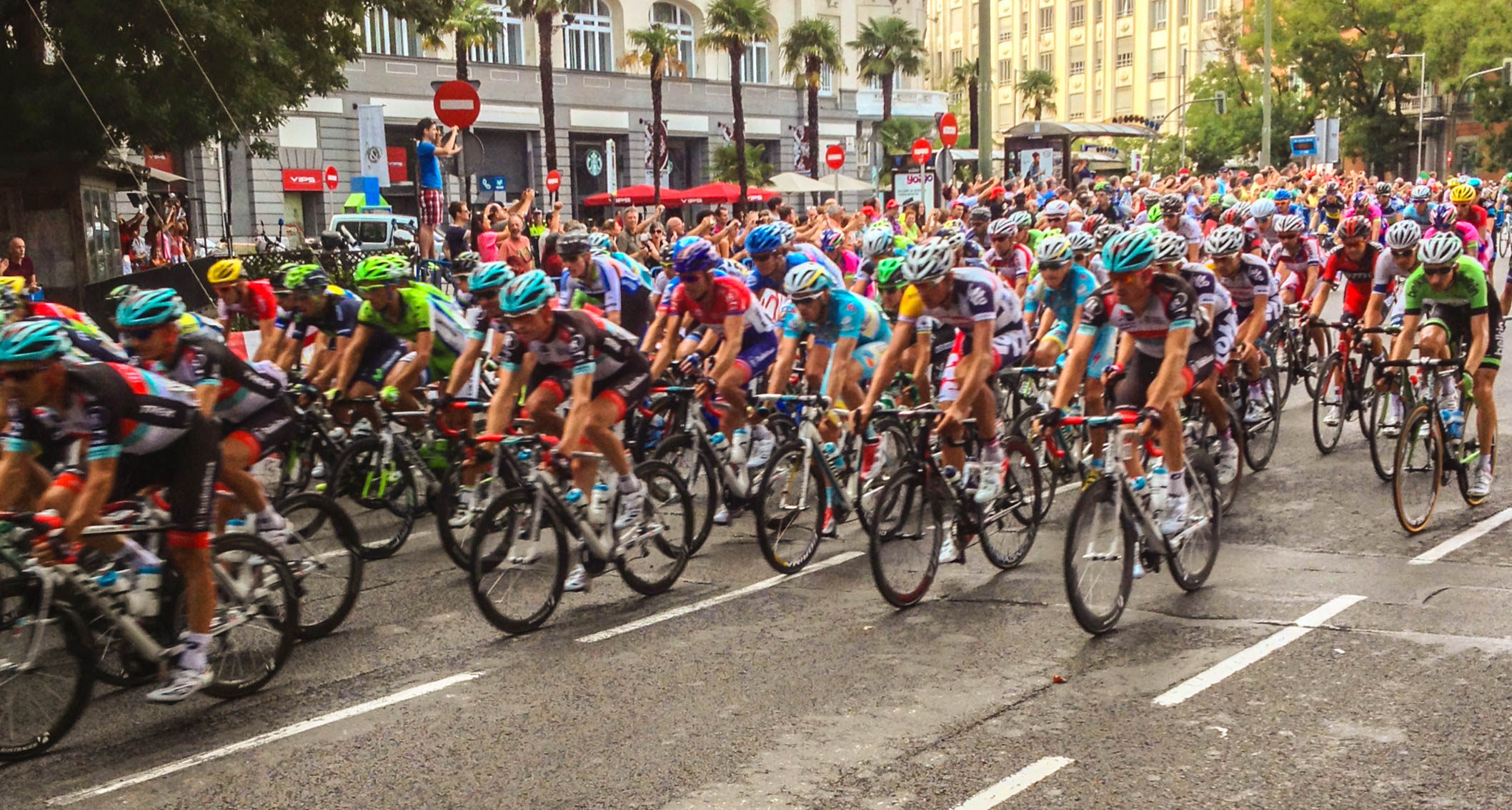
The 21st and final stage of the Vuelta a España 2013 on Paseo del Prado in Madrid, 15 September 2013.

Among the 22 teams that participated in the 2013 Vuelta a España, 19 were UCI World Tour teams, and 3 were Professional Continental teams. The list below contains 198 cyclists entered in the 2013 Vuelta a España, which began on 22 August and finished on 15 September.

== Teams ==
- Ag2r–La Mondiale
- Argos–Shimano
- Astana
- Belkin Pro Cycling
- Caja Rural–Seguros RGA*
- BMC Racing Team
- Cannondale
- Cofidis*
- Euskaltel–Euskadi
- FDJ
- Garmin–Sharp
- Lampre–Merida
- Lotto–Belisol
- Movistar Team
- Omega Pharma–Quick-Step
- Orica–GreenEDGE
- RadioShack–Leopard
- Team Katusha
- Saxo–Tinkoff
- Team Sky
- NetApp–Endura*
- Vacansoleil–DCM

*: Pro Continental teams given wild card entry to this event.

== By rider ==
Legend
No.	Starting number worn by the rider during the Vuelta	Pos.	Position in the general classification
OTL	Denotes a rider finished outside the time limit, followed by the stage in which they did so	DNS	Denotes a rider who did not start, followed by the stage before which they withdrew
DNF	Denotes a rider who did not finish, followed by the stage in which they withdrew	DSQ	Denotes a rider who was disqualified, followed by the stage in which they were withdrawn

No.	Rider	Team	Position
1	(Spain) Alejandro Valverde	Movistar Team	3
2	(Italy) Eros Capecchi	Movistar Team	24
3	(Spain) Imanol Erviti	Movistar Team	102
4	(Spain) Iván Gutiérrez	Movistar Team	119
5	(Spain) José Herrada	Movistar Team	12
6	(Spain) Beñat Intxausti	Movistar Team	87
7	(Spain) Pablo Lastras	Movistar Team	DNF-13
8	(Spain) Javier Moreno	Movistar Team	76
9	(Poland) Sylwester Szmyd	Movistar Team	45
11	(Italy) Domenico Pozzovivo	Ag2r–La Mondiale	6
12	(France) Julien Bérard	Ag2r–La Mondiale	94
13	(Colombia) Carlos Betancur	Ag2r–La Mondiale	126
14	(France) Steve Chainel	Ag2r–La Mondiale	DNF-14
15	(France) Mikael Cherel	Ag2r–La Mondiale	56
16	(Luxembourg) Ben Gastauer	Ag2r–La Mondiale	65
17	(France) Lloyd Mondory	Ag2r–La Mondiale	114
18	(Italy) Matteo Montaguti	Ag2r–La Mondiale	DNS-11
19	(Italy) Rinaldo Nocentini	Ag2r–La Mondiale	53
21	(Germany) Nikias Arndt	Argos–Shimano	136
22	(France) Warren Barguil	Argos–Shimano	38
23	(Germany) Johannes Fröhlinger	Argos–Shimano	59
24	(France) Thierry Hupond	Argos–Shimano	DNF-20
25	(South Africa) Reinardt Janse van Rensburg	Argos–Shimano	98
26	(United States) Thomas Peterson	Argos–Shimano	116
27	(Austria) Georg Preidler	Argos–Shimano	36
28	(Netherlands) Ramon Sinkeldam	Argos–Shimano	DNF-14
29	(Netherlands) Tom Stamsnijder	Argos–Shimano	137
31	(Italy) Vincenzo Nibali	Astana	2
32	(Slovenia) Janez Brajkovič	Astana	26
33	(Denmark) Jakob Fuglsang	Astana	29
34	(Ukraine) Andriy Hryvko	Astana	101
35	(Kazakhstan) Maxim Iglinsky	Astana	DNF-19
36	(Estonia) Tanel Kangert	Astana	11
37	(Italy) Paolo Tiralongo	Astana	51
38	(Italy) Alessandro Vanotti	Astana	113
39	(Kazakhstan) Andrey Zeits	Astana	81
41	(Netherlands) Bauke Mollema	Belkin Pro Cycling	52
42	(Netherlands) Theo Bos	Belkin Pro Cycling	DNS-1
43	(Australia) Graeme Brown	Belkin Pro Cycling	DNF-15
44	(Netherlands) Stef Clement	Belkin Pro Cycling	DNF-13
45	(Spain) Juan Manuel Gárate	Belkin Pro Cycling	71
46	(Spain) Luis León Sánchez	Belkin Pro Cycling	DNF-14
47	(Australia) David Tanner	Belkin Pro Cycling	106
48	(Netherlands) Laurens ten Dam	Belkin Pro Cycling	DNF-13
49	(Germany) Robert Wagner	Belkin Pro Cycling	123
51	(Belgium) Philippe Gilbert	BMC Racing Team	DNF-15
52	(Belgium) Yannick Eijssen	BMC Racing Team	83
53	(Switzerland) Martin Kohler	BMC Racing Team	66
54	(Denmark) Sebastian Lander	BMC Racing Team	DNS-13
55	(Belgium) Klaas Lodewyck	BMC Racing Team	120
56	(Germany) Dominik Nerz	BMC Racing Team	14
57	(Italy) Marco Pinotti	BMC Racing Team	DNS-12
58	(Italy) Ivan Santaromita	BMC Racing Team	48
59	(Switzerland) Danilo Wyss	BMC Racing Team	72
61	(Spain) David Arroyo	Caja Rural–Seguros RGA	13
62	(Spain) Javier Aramendia	Caja Rural–Seguros RGA	118
63	(Portugal) André Cardoso	Caja Rural–Seguros RGA	16
64	(Uruguay) Fabricio Ferrari	Caja Rural–Seguros RGA	121
65	(Spain) Marcos García	Caja Rural–Seguros RGA	75
66	(Italy) Francesco Lasca	Caja Rural–Seguros RGA	140
67	(Spain) Antonio Piedra	Caja Rural–Seguros RGA	109
68	(Spain) Amets Txurruka	Caja Rural–Seguros RGA	25
69	(Spain) Iván Velasco	Caja Rural–Seguros RGA	DNS-11
71	(Italy) Ivan Basso	Cannondale	DNF-14
72	(Canada) Guillaume Boivin	Cannondale	DNF-10
73	(Italy) Tiziano Dall'Antonia	Cannondale	111
74	(Argentina) Lucas Sebastián Haedo	Cannondale	139
75	(Italy) Paolo Longo Borghini	Cannondale	89
76	(Poland) Maciej Paterski	Cannondale	54
77	(Italy) Daniele Ratto	Cannondale	95
78	(Colombia) Cayetano Sarmiento	Cannondale	57
79	(Australia) Cameron Wurf	Cannondale	99
81	(France) Jérôme Coppel	Cofidis	40
82	(France) Yoann Bagot	Cofidis	21
83	(France) Cyril Bessy	Cofidis	DNF-14
84	(France) Nicolas Edet	Cofidis	104
85	(Spain) Luis Ángel Maté	Cofidis	42
86	(France) Adrien Petit	Cofidis	130
87	(France) Stéphane Poulhies	Cofidis	138
88	(Belgium) Nico Sijmens	Cofidis	78
89	(Belgium) Romain Zingle	Cofidis	91
91	(Spain) Samuel Sánchez	Euskaltel–Euskadi	8
92	(Spain) Igor Antón	Euskaltel–Euskadi	20
93	(Spain) Jorge Azanza	Euskaltel–Euskadi	90
94	(Spain) Mikel Landa	Euskaltel–Euskadi	39
95	(Spain) Egoi Martínez	Euskaltel–Euskadi	30
96	(Spain) Mikel Nieve	Euskaltel–Euskadi	23
97	(Spain) Juan José Oroz	Euskaltel–Euskadi	46
98	(Spain) Pablo Urtasun	Euskaltel–Euskadi	122
99	(Spain) Gorka Verdugo	Euskaltel–Euskadi	63
101	(France) Thibaut Pinot	FDJ.fr	7
102	(France) Arnaud Courteille	FDJ.fr	132
103	(France) Kenny Elissonde	FDJ.fr	33
104	(France) Alexandre Geniez	FDJ.fr	47
105	(France) Laurent Mangel	FDJ.fr	DNF-13
106	(France) Cédric Pineau	FDJ.fr	103
107	(France) Anthony Roux	FDJ.fr	34
108	(France) Geoffrey Soupe	FDJ.fr	DNF-12
109	(Finland) Jussi Veikkanen	FDJ.fr	DNF-18
111	(Republic of Ireland) Dan Martin	Garmin–Sharp	DNS-8
112	(United States) Caleb Fairly	Garmin–Sharp	112
113	(United States) Tyler Farrar	Garmin–Sharp	124
114	(Spain) Koldo Fernández	Garmin–Sharp	DNS-2
115	(United States) Alex Howes	Garmin–Sharp	93
116	(Netherlands) Michel Kreder	Garmin–Sharp	DNF-14
117	(Belgium) Nick Nuyens	Garmin–Sharp	DNF-14
118	(Denmark) Alex Rasmussen	Garmin–Sharp	134
119	(Belgium) Johan Vansummeren	Garmin–Sharp	88
121	(Spain) Joaquim Rodríguez	Team Katusha	4
122	(Italy) Giampaolo Caruso	Team Katusha	49
123	(Russia) Vladimir Gusev	Team Katusha	62
124	(Russia) Vladimir Isaichev	Team Katusha	131
125	(Russia) Dmitry Kozonchuk	Team Katusha	92
126	(Spain) Alberto Losada	Team Katusha	DNF-10
127	(Spain) Daniel Moreno	Team Katusha	10
128	(Italy) Luca Paolini	Team Katusha	107
129	(Spain) Ángel Vicioso	Team Katusha	80
131	(Italy) Michele Scarponi	Lampre–Merida	15
132	(Colombia) Winner Anacona	Lampre–Merida	105
133	(Italy) Matteo Bono	Lampre–Merida	143
134	(Italy) Luca Dodi	Lampre–Merida	129
135	(Italy) Massimo Graziato	Lampre–Merida	144
136	(Italy) Manuele Mori	Lampre–Merida	70
137	(Argentina) Maximiliano Richeze	Lampre–Merida	141
138	(Italy) Simone Stortoni	Lampre–Merida	DNF-15
139	(Italy) Diego Ulissi	Lampre–Merida	32
141	(Belgium) Bart De Clercq	Lotto–Belisol	DNF-10
142	(Belgium) Francis De Greef	Lotto–Belisol	41
143	(Australia) Adam Hansen	Lotto–Belisol	60
144	(New Zealand) Greg Henderson	Lotto–Belisol	DNF-14
145	(Spain) Vicente Reynès	Lotto–Belisol	DNS-13
146	(Belgium) Jurgen Van de Walle	Lotto–Belisol	DNF-14
147	(Belgium) Tosh Van der Sande	Lotto–Belisol	127
148	(Belgium) Jelle Vanendert	Lotto–Belisol	DNF-14
149	(Belgium) Dennis Vanendert	Lotto–Belisol	108
151	(Czech Republic) Leopold König	NetApp–Endura	9
152	(Czech Republic) Jan Bárta	NetApp–Endura	96
153	(Spain) Iker Camaño	NetApp–Endura	67
154	(Spain) David de la Cruz	NetApp–Endura	DNF-13
155	(Australia) Zak Dempster	NetApp–Endura	133
156	(Poland) Bartosz Huzarski	NetApp–Endura	35
157	(Portugal) José Mendes	NetApp–Endura	22
158	(Austria) Daniel Schorn	NetApp–Endura	DNF-15
159	(Germany) Paul Voss	NetApp–Endura	68
161	(Germany) Tony Martin	Omega Pharma–Quick-Step	DNF-15
162	(Belgium) Kevin De Weert	Omega Pharma–Quick-Step	DNF-11
163	(United Kingdom) Andrew Fenn	Omega Pharma–Quick-Step	DSQ-10
164	(Belgium) Gianni Meersman	Omega Pharma–Quick-Step	58
165	(Belgium) Serge Pauwels	Omega Pharma–Quick-Step	31
166	(Belgium) Pieter Serry	Omega Pharma–Quick-Step	50
167	(Czech Republic) Zdeněk Štybar	Omega Pharma–Quick-Step	DNF-15
168	(Belgium) Guillaume Van Keirsbulck	Omega Pharma–Quick-Step	125
169	(Belgium) Kristof Vandewalle	Omega Pharma–Quick-Step	DNF-15
171	(Australia) Simon Gerrans	Orica–GreenEDGE	DNS-14
172	(New Zealand) Sam Bewley	Orica–GreenEDGE	DNS-14
173	(Australia) Simon Clarke	Orica–GreenEDGE	69
174	(Australia) Baden Cooke	Orica–GreenEDGE	DNF-15
175	(Australia) Mitchell Docker	Orica–GreenEDGE	135
176	(Australia) Leigh Howard	Orica–GreenEDGE	142
177	(Canada) Christian Meier	Orica–GreenEDGE	82
178	(Australia) Michael Matthews	Orica–GreenEDGE	110
179	(Australia) Wesley Sulzberger	Orica–GreenEDGE	DNS-5
181	(Switzerland) Fabian Cancellara	RadioShack–Leopard	DNS-18
182	(United States) Matthew Busche	RadioShack–Leopard	64
183	(Belgium) Ben Hermans	RadioShack–Leopard	61
184	(United States) Chris Horner	RadioShack–Leopard	1
185	(Spain) Markel Irizar	RadioShack–Leopard	86
186	(Croatia) Robert Kišerlovski	RadioShack–Leopard	17
187	(Ukraine) Yaroslav Popovych	RadioShack–Leopard	85
188	(Switzerland) Grégory Rast	RadioShack–Leopard	77
189	(Spain) Haimar Zubeldia	RadioShack–Leopard	DNF-14
191	(Colombia) Sergio Henao	Team Sky	28
192	(Norway) Edvald Boasson Hagen	Team Sky	84
193	(Italy) Dario Cataldo	Team Sky	74
194	(Belarus) Vasil Kiryienka	Team Sky	73
195	(Germany) Christian Knees	Team Sky	79
196	(Italy) Salvatore Puccio	Team Sky	DNS-20
197	(United Kingdom) Luke Rowe	Team Sky	DNF-15
198	(Colombia) Rigoberto Urán	Team Sky	27
199	(Spain) Xabier Zandio	Team Sky	55
201	(Czech Republic) Roman Kreuziger	Saxo–Tinkoff	DNF-14
202	(Poland) Rafał Majka	Saxo–Tinkoff	19
203	(Denmark) Michael Mørkøv	Saxo–Tinkoff	128
204	(Russia) Evgeni Petrov	Saxo–Tinkoff	117
205	(Republic of Ireland) Nicolas Roche	Saxo–Tinkoff	5
206	(Denmark) Chris Anker Sørensen	Saxo–Tinkoff	18
207	(Denmark) Nicki Sørensen	Saxo–Tinkoff	100
208	(Italy) Matteo Tosatto	Saxo–Tinkoff	115
208	(Switzerland) Oliver Zaugg	Saxo–Tinkoff	37
211	(Netherlands) Wout Poels	Vacansoleil–DCM	DNF-14
212	(Slovenia) Grega Bole	Vacansoleil–DCM	97
213	(Belgium) Thomas De Gendt	Vacansoleil–DCM	DSQ-10
214	(Spain) Juan Antonio Flecha	Vacansoleil–DCM	44
215	(Netherlands) Johnny Hoogerland	Vacansoleil–DCM	DNF-19
216	(Poland) Tomasz Marczyński	Vacansoleil–DCM	DNS-15
217	(Netherlands) Barry Markus	Vacansoleil–DCM	DNF-10
218	(Spain) Rafael Valls	Vacansoleil–DCM	43
219	(Netherlands) Lieuwe Westra	Vacansoleil–DCM	DNF-14

== By nationality ==
Country	No. of riders	Finishers	Stage wins
Argentina	2	2	
Australia	12	8	1 (Michael Matthews x1)
Austria	2	1	
Belarus	1	1	1 (Vasil Kiryienka x1)
Belgium	21	13	1 (Philippe Gilbert x1)
Canada	2	1	
Colombia	5	5	
Croatia	1	1	
Czech Republic	4	2	2 (Zdeněk Štybar x1, Leopold König x1)
Denmark	6	5	1 (Michael Mørkøv x1)
Estonia	1	1	
Finland	1	0	
France	20	15	4 (Warren Barguil x2, Alexandre Geniez x1, Kenny Elissonde x1)
Germany	7	6	
Ireland	2	1	1 (Nicolas Roche x1)
Italy	26	21	1 (Daniele Ratto x1)
Kazakhstan	2	1	
Luxembourg	1	1	
Netherlands	11	2	1 (Bauke Mollema x1)
Norway	1	1	
New Zealand	2	0	
Poland	5	4	
Portugal	2	2	
Russia	4	4	
Slovenia	2	2	
South Africa	1	1	
Spain	38	30	3 (Daniel Moreno x2, Joaquim Rodríguez x1)
Switzerland	5	4	1 (Fabian Cancellara x1)
Ukraine	2	2	
Uruguay	1	1	
Great Britain	2	0	
United States	6	6	2 (Chris Horner x2)
TOTAL	198	144	

== See also ==
- 2013 Vuelta a España
