= 2013 Vuelta a España, Stage 1 to Stage 11 =

Cycling race stages

The 2013 Vuelta a España began on 24 August, and stage 11 occurred on 4 September. The 2013 edition began with a team time trial stage – where each member of a team started together racing against the clock – in Vilanova de Arousa with the second stage unusually a mountain stage. The eleventh stage, after the first rest day, is the only individual time trial of the race.

Legend (Note: Jerseys appearing in the table on the left of the page indicate those worn by the cyclist during the particular stage, while those appearing in the table on the right of the page indicate those awarded to the cyclist after the stage.)
A red jersey	Denotes the leader of the General classification	A bluedotted jersey	Denotes the leader of the Mountains classification
A green jersey	Denotes the leader of the Points classification	A white jersey	Denotes the leader of the Combination classification
A jersey with a white rider number on a red background	Denotes the rider designated as the day's most combative	s.t.	A rider that crossed the finish line in the same group as the one receiving the time above him and was therefore credited with the same finishing time.

== Stage 1 ==
24 August 2013 — Vilanova de Arousa to Sanxenxo, 27.4 km (17.0 mi), team time trial (TTT)

For the fourth year in succession, the Vuelta began with a team time trial.

Stage 1 result

	Team	Time
1	Astana	29' 59"
2	RadioShack–Leopard	+ 10"
3	Omega Pharma–Quick-Step	+ 16"
4	Team Sky	+ 22"
5	Movistar Team	+ 29"
6	Saxo–Tinkoff	+ 32"
7	NetApp–Endura	+ 35"
8	BMC Racing Team	+ 36"
9	Orica–GreenEDGE	+ 45"
10	Belkin Pro Cycling	+ 49"

General classification after stage 1

	Rider	Team	Time
1	Janez Brajkovič (SLO)	Astana	29' 59"
2	Vincenzo Nibali (ITA)	Astana	+ 0"
3	Paolo Tiralongo (ITA)	Astana	+ 0"
4	Jakob Fuglsang (DEN)	Astana	+ 0"
5	Andriy Hryvko (UKR)	Astana	+ 0"
6	Tanel Kangert (EST)	Astana	+ 0"
7	Fabian Cancellara (SUI)	RadioShack–Leopard	+ 10"
8	Haimar Zubeldia (ESP)	RadioShack–Leopard	+ 10"
9	Markel Irizar (ESP)	RadioShack–Leopard	+ 10"
10	Robert Kišerlovski (CRO)	RadioShack–Leopard	+ 10"

== Stage 2 ==
25 August 2013 — Pontevedra to Baiona–Alto do Monte da Groba, 177.7 km (110.4 mi)

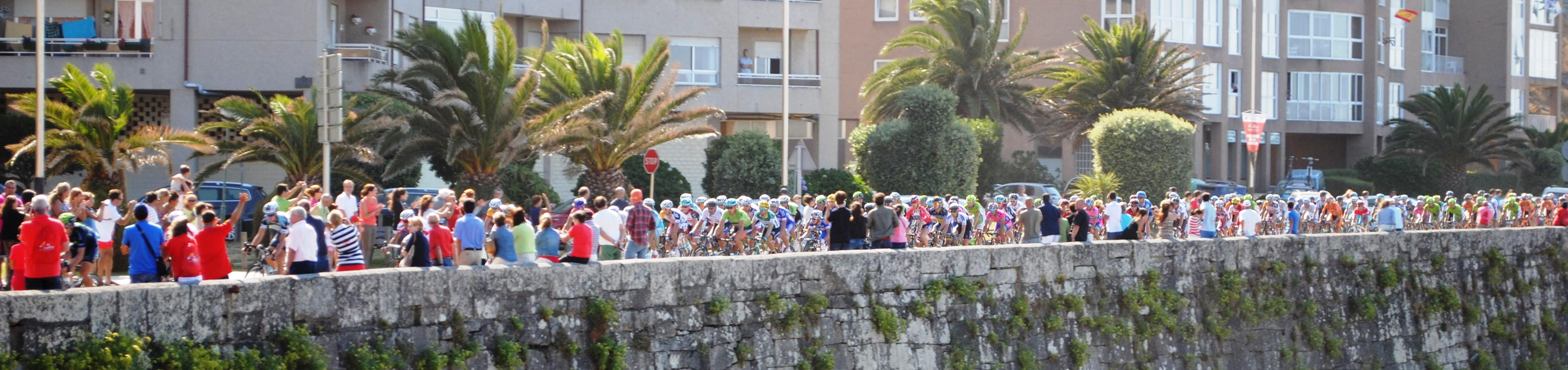
The peloton crossing Baiona.

Stage 2 result

	Rider	Team	Time
1	Nicolas Roche (IRL)	Saxo–Tinkoff	4h 37' 09"
2	Daniel Moreno (ESP)	Team Katusha	+ 2"
3	Domenico Pozzovivo (ITA)	Ag2r–La Mondiale	+ 6"
4	Leopold König (CZE)	NetApp–Endura	+ 11"
5	Alejandro Valverde (ESP)	Movistar Team	+ 12"
6	Diego Ulissi (ITA)	Lampre–Merida	+ 12"
7	Joaquim Rodríguez (ESP)	Team Katusha	+ 12"
8	Ivan Basso (ITA)	Cannondale	+ 14"
9	Bauke Mollema (NED)	Belkin Pro Cycling	+ 14"
10	Rigoberto Urán (COL)	Team Sky	+ 14"

General classification after stage 2

	Rider	Team	Time
1	Vincenzo Nibali (ITA)	Astana	5h 07' 22"
2	Nicolas Roche (IRL)	Saxo–Tinkoff	+ 8"
3	Haimar Zubeldia (ESP)	RadioShack–Leopard	+ 10"
4	Chris Horner (USA)	RadioShack–Leopard	+ 10"
5	Robert Kišerlovski (CRO)	RadioShack–Leopard	+ 10"
6	Rigoberto Urán (COL)	Team Sky	+ 22"
7	Ben Hermans (BEL)	RadioShack–Leopard	+ 27"
8	Alejandro Valverde (ESP)	Movistar Team	+ 27"
9	Rafał Majka (POL)	Saxo–Tinkoff	+ 32"
10	Roman Kreuziger (CZE)	Saxo–Tinkoff	+ 32"

== Stage 3 ==
26 August 2013 — Vigo to Mirador de Lobeira–Vilagarcía de Arousa, 184.8 km (114.8 mi)

Stage 3 result

	Rider	Team	Time
1	Chris Horner (USA)	RadioShack–Leopard	4h 30' 18"
2	Alejandro Valverde (ESP)	Movistar Team	+ 3"
3	Joaquim Rodríguez (ESP)	Team Katusha	+ 3"
4	Rigoberto Urán (COL)	Team Sky	+ 3"
5	Dan Martin (IRL)	Garmin–Sharp	+ 3"
6	Bauke Mollema (NED)	Belkin Pro Cycling	+ 3"
7	Michele Scarponi (ITA)	Lampre–Merida	+ 3"
8	Haimar Zubeldia (ESP)	RadioShack–Leopard	+ 3"
9	Nicolas Roche (IRL)	Saxo–Tinkoff	+ 3"
10	Ivan Basso (ITA)	Cannondale	+ 3"

General classification after stage 3

	Rider	Team	Time
1	Chris Horner (USA)	RadioShack–Leopard	9h 37' 40"
2	Vincenzo Nibali (ITA)	Astana	+ 3"
3	Nicolas Roche (IRL)	Saxo–Tinkoff	+ 11"
4	Haimar Zubeldia (ESP)	RadioShack–Leopard	+ 13"
5	Robert Kišerlovski (CRO)	RadioShack–Leopard	+ 23"
6	Alejandro Valverde (ESP)	Movistar Team	+ 24"
7	Rigoberto Urán (COL)	Team Sky	+ 25"
8	Rafał Majka (POL)	Saxo–Tinkoff	+ 35"
9	Daniel Moreno (ESP)	Team Katusha	+ 44"
10	Roman Kreuziger (CZE)	Saxo–Tinkoff	+ 45"

== Stage 4 ==
27 August 2013 — Lalín–A Estrada to Fisterra–Etapa Fin del Mundo, 189 km (117.4 mi)

Stage 4 result

	Rider	Team	Time
1	Daniel Moreno (ESP)	Team Katusha	4h 37' 47"
2	Fabian Cancellara (SUI)	RadioShack–Leopard	s.t.
3	Michael Matthews (AUS)	Orica–GreenEDGE	s.t.
4	Gianni Meersman (BEL)	Omega Pharma–Quick-Step	s.t.
5	Bauke Mollema (NED)	Belkin Pro Cycling	s.t.
6	Edvald Boasson Hagen (NOR)	Team Sky	s.t.
7	Rinaldo Nocentini (ITA)	Ag2r–La Mondiale	s.t.
8	Warren Barguil (FRA)	Argos–Shimano	s.t.
9	Sergio Henao (COL)	Team Sky	s.t.
10	Nicolas Roche (IRL)	Saxo–Tinkoff	s.t.

General classification after stage 4

	Rider	Team	Time
1	Vincenzo Nibali (ITA)	Astana	14h 15' 30"
2	Chris Horner (USA)	RadioShack–Leopard	+ 3"
3	Nicolas Roche (IRL)	Saxo–Tinkoff	+ 8"
4	Haimar Zubeldia (ESP)	RadioShack–Leopard	+ 16"
5	Alejandro Valverde (ESP)	Movistar Team	+ 21"
6	Robert Kišerlovski (CRO)	RadioShack–Leopard	+ 26"
7	Rigoberto Urán (COL)	Team Sky	+ 28"
8	Daniel Moreno (ESP)	Team Katusha	+ 31"
9	Rafał Majka (POL)	Saxo–Tinkoff	+ 38"
10	Roman Kreuziger (CZE)	Saxo–Tinkoff	+ 42"

== Stage 5 ==
28 August 2013 — Sober to Lago de Sanabria, 174.3 km (108.3 mi)

Stage 5 result

	Rider	Team	Time
1	Michael Matthews (AUS)	Orica–GreenEDGE	4h 28' 22"
2	Maximiliano Richeze (ARG)	Lampre–Merida	s.t.
3	Gianni Meersman (BEL)	Omega Pharma–Quick-Step	s.t.
4	Nikias Arndt (GER)	Argos–Shimano	s.t.
5	Tyler Farrar (USA)	Garmin–Sharp	s.t.
6	Edvald Boasson Hagen (NOR)	Team Sky	s.t.
7	Anthony Roux (FRA)	FDJ.fr	s.t.
8	Greg Henderson (NZL)	Lotto–Belisol	s.t.
9	Daniele Ratto (ITA)	Cannondale	s.t.
10	Grega Bole (SLO)	Vacansoleil–DCM	s.t.

General classification after stage 5

	Rider	Team	Time
1	Vincenzo Nibali (ITA)	Astana	18h 43' 52"
2	Chris Horner (USA)	RadioShack–Leopard	+ 3"
3	Nicolas Roche (IRL)	Saxo–Tinkoff	+ 8"
4	Haimar Zubeldia (ESP)	RadioShack–Leopard	+ 16"
5	Alejandro Valverde (ESP)	Movistar Team	+ 21"
6	Robert Kišerlovski (CRO)	RadioShack–Leopard	+ 26"
7	Rigoberto Urán (COL)	Team Sky	+ 28"
8	Daniel Moreno (ESP)	Team Katusha	+ 31"
9	Rafał Majka (POL)	Saxo–Tinkoff	+ 38"
10	Roman Kreuziger (CZE)	Saxo–Tinkoff	+ 42"

== Stage 6 ==
29 August 2013 — Guijuelo to Cáceres, 175 km (108.7 mi)

Stage 6 result

	Rider	Team	Time
1	Michael Mørkøv (DEN)	Saxo–Tinkoff	3h 54' 15"
2	Maximiliano Richeze (ARG)	Lampre–Merida	s.t.
3	Fabian Cancellara (SUI)	RadioShack–Leopard	s.t.
4	Tyler Farrar (USA)	Garmin–Sharp	s.t.
5	Juan Antonio Flecha (ESP)	Vacansoleil–DCM	s.t.
6	Michael Matthews (AUS)	Orica–GreenEDGE	s.t.
7	Tony Martin (GER)	Omega Pharma–Quick-Step	s.t.
8	Gianni Meersman (BEL)	Omega Pharma–Quick-Step	s.t.
9	Philippe Gilbert (BEL)	BMC Racing Team	s.t.
10	Graeme Brown (AUS)	Belkin Pro Cycling	s.t.

General classification after stage 6

	Rider	Team	Time
1	Vincenzo Nibali (ITA)	Astana	22h 38' 07"
2	Chris Horner (USA)	RadioShack–Leopard	+ 3"
3	Nicolas Roche (IRL)	Saxo–Tinkoff	+ 8"
4	Haimar Zubeldia (ESP)	RadioShack–Leopard	+ 16"
5	Alejandro Valverde (ESP)	Movistar Team	+ 21"
6	Robert Kišerlovski (CRO)	RadioShack–Leopard	+ 26"
7	Rigoberto Urán (COL)	Team Sky	+ 28"
8	Daniel Moreno (ESP)	Team Katusha	+ 31"
9	Rafał Majka (POL)	Saxo–Tinkoff	+ 38"
10	Roman Kreuziger (CZE)	Saxo–Tinkoff	+ 42"

== Stage 7 ==
30 August 2013 — Almendralejo to Mairena del Aljarafe, 205.9 km (127.9 mi)

Stage 7 result

	Rider	Team	Time
1	Zdeněk Štybar (CZE)	Omega Pharma–Quick-Step	4h 51' 27"
2	Philippe Gilbert (BEL)	BMC Racing Team	s.t.
3	Robert Wagner (GER)	Belkin Pro Cycling	+ 1"
4	Adrien Petit (FRA)	Cofidis	+ 1"
5	Juan Antonio Flecha (ESP)	Vacansoleil–DCM	+ 1"
6	Andrew Fenn (GBR)	Omega Pharma–Quick-Step	+ 1"
7	Edvald Boasson Hagen (NOR)	Team Sky	+ 1"
8	Danilo Wyss (SUI)	BMC Racing Team	+ 1"
9	Klaas Lodewyck (BEL)	BMC Racing Team	+ 1"
10	Reinardt Janse van Rensburg (RSA)	Argos–Shimano	+ 1"

General classification after stage 7

	Rider	Team	Time
1	Vincenzo Nibali (ITA)	Astana	27h 29' 35"
2	Chris Horner (USA)	RadioShack–Leopard	+ 3"
3	Nicolas Roche (IRL)	Saxo–Tinkoff	+ 8"
4	Haimar Zubeldia (ESP)	RadioShack–Leopard	+ 16"
5	Alejandro Valverde (ESP)	Movistar Team	+ 21"
6	Robert Kišerlovski (CRO)	RadioShack–Leopard	+ 26"
7	Rigoberto Urán (COL)	Team Sky	+ 28"
8	Daniel Moreno (ESP)	Team Katusha	+ 31"
9	Rafał Majka (POL)	Saxo–Tinkoff	+ 38"
10	Roman Kreuziger (CZE)	Saxo–Tinkoff	+ 42"

== Stage 8 ==
31 August 2013 — Jerez de la Frontera to Estepona–Alto Peñas Blancas, 166.6 km (103.5 mi)

Stage 8 result

	Rider	Team	Time
1	Leopold König (CZE)	NetApp–Endura	4h 09' 46"
2	Daniel Moreno (ESP)	Team Katusha	+ 1"
3	Nicolas Roche (IRL)	Saxo–Tinkoff	+ 5"
4	Thibaut Pinot (FRA)	FDJ.fr	+ 5"
5	Ivan Basso (ITA)	Cannondale	+ 5"
6	Bart De Clercq (BEL)	Lotto–Belisol	+ 8"
7	Igor Antón (ESP)	Euskaltel–Euskadi	+ 13"
8	Alejandro Valverde (ESP)	Movistar Team	+ 19"
9	Joaquim Rodríguez (ESP)	Team Katusha	+ 19"
10	Rigoberto Urán (COL)	Team Sky	+ 23"

General classification after stage 8

	Rider	Team	Time
1	Nicolas Roche (IRL)	Saxo–Tinkoff	31h 39' 30"
2	Chris Horner (USA)	RadioShack–Leopard	+ 17"
3	Daniel Moreno (ESP)	Team Katusha	+ 17"
4	Vincenzo Nibali (ITA)	Astana	+ 18"
5	Leopold König (CZE)	NetApp–Endura	+ 29"
6	Haimar Zubeldia (ESP)	RadioShack–Leopard	+ 30"
7	Alejandro Valverde (ESP)	Movistar Team	+ 31"
8	Rigoberto Urán (COL)	Team Sky	+ 42"
9	Rafał Majka (POL)	Saxo–Tinkoff	+ 52"
10	Joaquim Rodríguez (ESP)	Team Katusha	+ 1' 03"

== Stage 9 ==
1 September 2013 — Antequera to Valdepeñas de Jaén, 163.7 km (101.7 mi)

Stage 9 result

	Rider	Team	Time
1	Daniel Moreno (ESP)	Team Katusha	4h 18' 57"
2	Alejandro Valverde (ESP)	Movistar Team	+ 4"
3	Joaquim Rodríguez (ESP)	Team Katusha	+ 4"
4	Nicolas Roche (IRL)	Saxo–Tinkoff	+ 8"
5	Samuel Sánchez (ESP)	Euskaltel–Euskadi	+ 8"
6	Rinaldo Nocentini (ITA)	Ag2r–La Mondiale	+ 8"
7	Vincenzo Nibali (ITA)	Astana	+ 8"
8	Philippe Gilbert (BEL)	BMC Racing Team	+ 13"
9	Warren Barguil (FRA)	Argos–Shimano	+ 13"
10	Igor Antón (ESP)	Euskaltel–Euskadi	+ 15"

General classification after stage 9

	Rider	Team	Time
1	Daniel Moreno (ESP)	Team Katusha	35h 58' 34"
2	Nicolas Roche (IRL)	Saxo–Tinkoff	+ 1"
3	Vincenzo Nibali (ITA)	Astana	+ 19"
4	Alejandro Valverde (ESP)	Movistar Team	+ 22"
5	Chris Horner (USA)	RadioShack–Leopard	+ 28"
6	Joaquim Rodríguez (ESP)	Team Katusha	+ 56"
7	Leopold König (CZE)	NetApp–Endura	+ 1' 09"
8	Haimar Zubeldia (ESP)	RadioShack–Leopard	+ 1' 10"
9	Rigoberto Urán (COL)	Team Sky	+ 1' 22"
10	Ivan Santaromita (ITA)	BMC Racing Team	+ 1' 25"

== Stage 10 ==
2 September 2013 — Torredelcampo to Güéjar Sierra–Alto Hazallanas, 186.8 km (116.1 mi)

Stage 10 result

	Rider	Team	Time
1	Chris Horner (USA)	RadioShack–Leopard	4h 30' 22"
2	Vincenzo Nibali (ITA)	Astana	+ 48"
3	Alejandro Valverde (ESP)	Movistar Team	+ 1' 02"
4	Ivan Basso (ITA)	Cannondale	+ 1' 02"
5	Joaquim Rodríguez (ESP)	Team Katusha	+ 1' 02"
6	Thibaut Pinot (FRA)	FDJ.fr	+ 1' 02"
7	Nicolas Roche (IRL)	Saxo–Tinkoff	+ 1' 10"
8	Igor Antón (ESP)	Euskaltel–Euskadi	+ 1' 25"
9	Domenico Pozzovivo (ITA)	Ag2r–La Mondiale	+ 1' 25"
10	Rafał Majka (POL)	Saxo–Tinkoff	+ 1' 52"

General classification after stage 10

	Rider	Team	Time
1	Chris Horner (USA)	RadioShack–Leopard	40h 29' 14"
2	Vincenzo Nibali (ITA)	Astana	+ 43"
3	Nicolas Roche (IRL)	Saxo–Tinkoff	+ 53"
4	Alejandro Valverde (ESP)	Movistar Team	+ 1' 02"
5	Joaquim Rodríguez (ESP)	Team Katusha	+ 1' 40"
6	Daniel Moreno (ESP)	Team Katusha	+ 2' 04"
7	Ivan Basso (ITA)	Cannondale	+ 2' 20"
8	Thibaut Pinot (FRA)	FDJ.fr	+ 3' 11"
9	Rafał Majka (POL)	Saxo–Tinkoff	+ 3' 16"
10	Domenico Pozzovivo (ITA)	Ag2r–La Mondiale	+ 3' 28"

== Stage 11 ==
4 September 2013 — Tarazona to Tarazona, 38.8 km (24.1 mi), individual time trial (ITT)

Stage 11 result

	Rider	Team	Time
1	Fabian Cancellara (SUI)	RadioShack–Leopard	51' 00"
2	Tony Martin (GER)	Omega Pharma–Quick-Step	+ 37"
3	Domenico Pozzovivo (ITA)	Ag2r–La Mondiale	+ 1' 24"
4	Vincenzo Nibali (ITA)	Astana	+ 1' 25"
5	Dario Cataldo (ITA)	Team Sky	+ 1' 41"
6	Nicolas Roche (IRL)	Saxo–Tinkoff	+ 1' 48"
7	Alejandro Valverde (ESP)	Movistar Team	+ 1' 52"
8	Jérôme Coppel (FRA)	Cofidis	+ 1' 52"
9	Janez Brajkovič (SLO)	Astana	+ 1' 53"
10	Samuel Sánchez (ESP)	Euskaltel–Euskadi	+ 2' 13"

General classification after stage 11

	Rider	Team	Time
1	Vincenzo Nibali (ITA)	Astana	41h 22' 22"
2	Nicolas Roche (IRL)	Saxo–Tinkoff	+ 33"
3	Alejandro Valverde (ESP)	Movistar Team	+ 46"
4	Chris Horner (USA)	RadioShack–Leopard	+ 46"
5	Joaquim Rodríguez (ESP)	Team Katusha	+ 2' 33"
6	Domenico Pozzovivo (ITA)	Ag2r–La Mondiale	+ 2' 44"
7	Ivan Basso (ITA)	Cannondale	+ 2' 55"
8	Thibaut Pinot (FRA)	FDJ.fr	+ 3' 35"
9	Rafał Majka (POL)	Saxo–Tinkoff	+ 3' 46"
10	Daniel Moreno (ESP)	Team Katusha	+ 3' 56"
