= 2013 Vuelta a España =

68th edition of the cycling race

2013 UCI World Tour, race 22 of 28
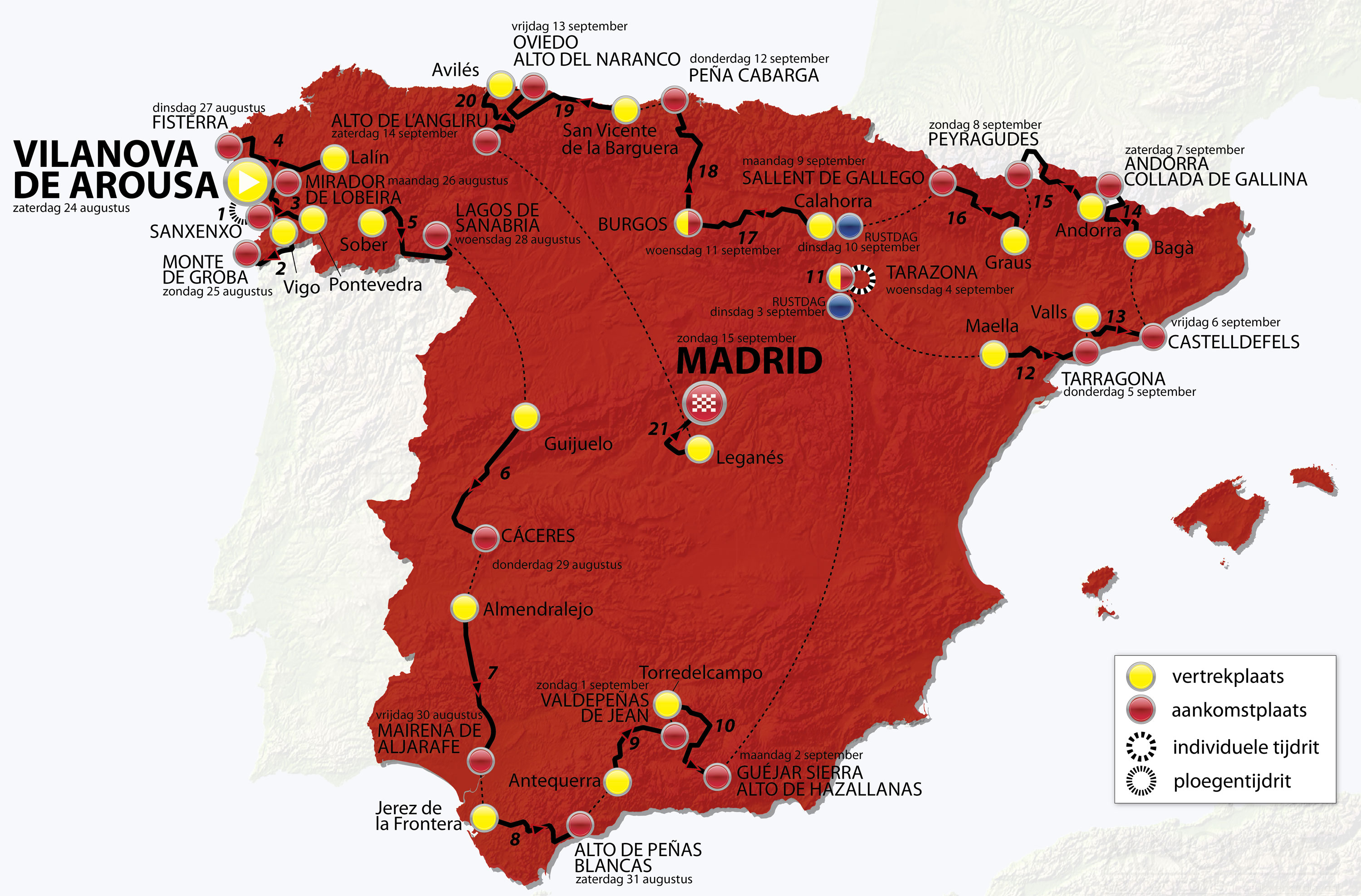

Race details
- Dates: 24 August – 15 September
- Stages: 21
- Distance: 3,358.9 km (2,087.1 mi)
- Winning time: 84h 36' 04"

Results
Jersey awarded to the overall winner	Winner	Chris Horner (USA)	(RadioShack–Leopard)
	Second	Vincenzo Nibali (ITA)	(Astana)
	Third	Alejandro Valverde (ESP)	(Movistar Team)
Jersey awarded to the points classification winner	Points	Alejandro Valverde (ESP)	(Movistar Team)
Jersey awarded to the mountains classification winner	Mountains	Nicolas Edet (FRA)	(Cofidis)
Jersey awarded to the combination classification winner	Combination	Chris Horner (USA)	(RadioShack–Leopard)
	Team	(Spain) Euskaltel–Euskadi	

The 2013 Vuelta a España was the 68th edition of the race. Chris Horner won the 2013 Vuelta at the age of 41, becoming the oldest ever Grand Tour winner. Horner beat his nearest challenger, Italian Vincenzo Nibali, by finishing ahead of him in each of the final three mountainous stages before the final stage into Madrid.

This Vuelta started in Galicia on August 24, 2013. The race spent 5 days in Galicia, then continued anticlockwise touring Spain through Castile and León, Extremadura, Andalusia, Aragon, Catalonia, La Rioja, Cantabria, and Asturias, before returning to Madrid for the finish on September 15. The Vuelta included excursions into two neighboring countries, Andorra and France. The top three stage winners received the following bonuses in the general classification: 10 seconds for winners of the stages, six seconds for runners-up, and four seconds for those in third place.

== Teams ==
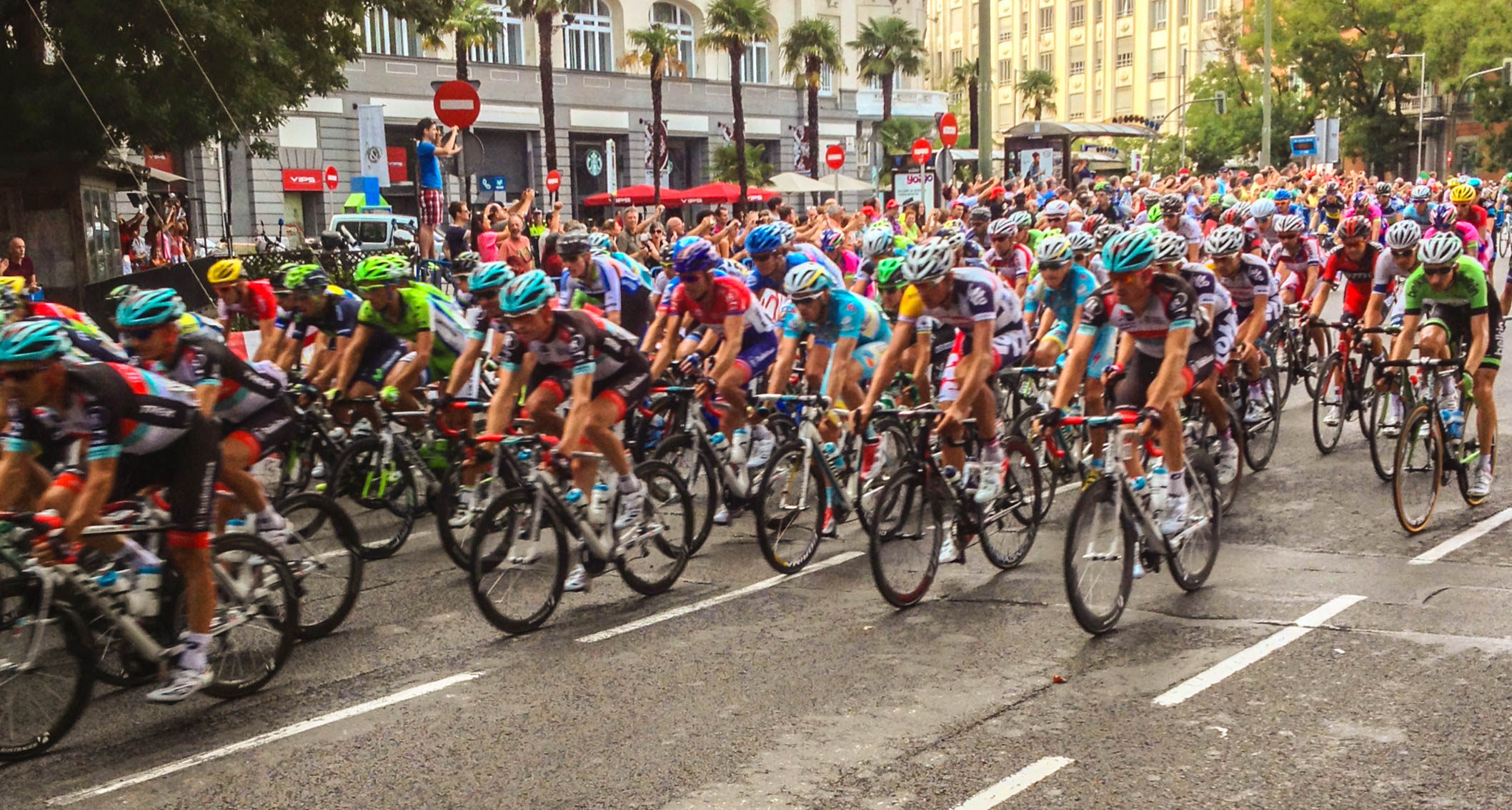
The 21st and final stage of the Vuelta a España 2013 on Paseo del Prado in Madrid.

The 19 UCI World Tour teams were automatically entitled to start the race; three wildcard teams were also invited.

- Ag2r–La Mondiale
- Argos–Shimano
- Astana
- Belkin Pro Cycling
- BMC Racing Team
- Cannondale
- Caja Rural–Seguros RGA†
- Cofidis†
- Euskaltel–Euskadi
- FDJ.fr
- Garmin–Sharp
- Team Katusha
- Lampre–Merida
- Lotto–Belisol
- Movistar Team
- Omega Pharma–Quick-Step
- Orica–GreenEDGE
- RadioShack–Leopard
- NetApp–Endura†
- Saxo–Tinkoff
- Team Sky
- Vacansoleil–DCM

†: Invited Pro-continental teams

== Route ==
Stage characteristics and winners
Stage	Date	Course	Distance	Type		Winner
1	24 August	Vilanova de Arousa to Sanxenxo	27.4 km (17.0 mi)	Team time trial	Team time trial	(Kazakhstan) Astana
2	25 August	Pontevedra to Monte da Groba	177.7 km (110.4 mi)		Medium-mountain stage	Nicolas Roche (IRL)
3	26 August	Vigo to Mirador de Lobeira	184.8 km (114.8 mi)		Flat stage	Chris Horner (USA)
4	27 August	Lalín to Finisterra	189 km (117 mi)		Medium-mountain stage	Daniel Moreno (ESP)
5	28 August	Sober to Lago de Sanabria	174.3 km (108.3 mi)		Medium-mountain stage	Michael Matthews (AUS)
6	29 August	Guijuelo to Caceres	175 km (109 mi)		Flat stage	Michael Mørkøv (DEN)
7	30 August	Almendralejo to Mairena del Aljarafe	205.9 km (127.9 mi)		Flat stage	Zdeněk Štybar (CZE)
8	31 August	Jerez de la Frontera to Alto de Peñas Blancas	166.6 km (103.5 mi)		Medium-mountain stage	Leopold König (CZE)
9	1 September	Antequera to Valdepeñas de Jaén	163.7 km (101.7 mi)		Medium-mountain stage	Daniel Moreno (ESP)
10	2 September	Torredelcampo to Alto de Haza Llanas	186.8 km (116.1 mi)		Mountain stage	Chris Horner (USA)
	3 September	Rest day				
11	4 September	Tarazona	38.8 km (24.1 mi)	Individual time trial	Individual time trial	Fabian Cancellara (SUI)
12	5 September	Maella to Tarragona	164.2 km (102.0 mi)		Flat stage	Philippe Gilbert (BEL)
13	6 September	Valls to Castelldefels	169 km (105 mi)		Medium-mountain stage	Warren Barguil (FRA)
14	7 September	Bagà to Coll de la Gallina (Andorra)	155.7 km (96.7 mi)		Mountain stage	Daniele Ratto (ITA)
15	8 September	Andorra (Andorra) to Peyragudes (France)	224.9 km (139.7 mi)		Mountain stage	Alexandre Geniez (FRA)
16	9 September	Graus to Formigal	146.8 km (91.2 mi)		Mountain stage	Warren Barguil (FRA)
	10 September	Rest day				
17	11 September	Calahorra to Burgos	189 km (117 mi)		Flat stage	Bauke Mollema (NED)
18	12 September	Burgos to Peña Cabarga	186.5 km (115.9 mi)		Mountain stage	Vasil Kiryienka (BLR)
19	13 September	San Vicente de la Barquera to Alto del Naranco	181 km (112 mi)		Medium-mountain stage	Joaquim Rodríguez (ESP)
20	14 September	Avilés to Alto de L'Angliru	142.2 km (88.4 mi)		Mountain stage	Kenny Elissonde (FRA)
21	15 September	Leganés to Madrid	109.6 km (68.1 mi)		Flat stage	Michael Matthews (AUS)
Total			3,358.9 km (2,087.1 mi)			

== Race overview ==
For in-depth details see 2013 Vuelta a España, Stage 1 to Stage 11 and 2013 Vuelta a España, Stage 12 to Stage 21

Stage one was a team time trial (TTT) which was won by Astana and resulted in Janez Brajkovič being awarded the red jersey. Stage two was won by Vincenzo Nibali who also took over the red jersey, but on the next stage Chris Horner would win and claim the lead.

The race would eventually evolve into a battle between Horner and Nibali, who was attempting to win a very rare Grand Tour Double as he had won the Giro a few months earlier. Horner meanwhile was more of an outside contender for victory and prior to the start of this Vuelta he had more or less acknowledged this by announcing during a team meeting that he could finish top 10. Privately however, he told his wife and friends that he could podium as he felt he was in very good form following the 2013 Tour of Utah. After winning on stage three he told his team he could podium and told his wife he could win. Daniel Moreno would win stage four as Nibali would win back the jersey and hold it for the next few stages.

Leopold König would win stage eight by one second over Daniel Moreno resulting in Nicolas Roche taking over the race lead. In stage nine Moreno would not be denied as he won his second stage, this one by four seconds, as he also took the red jersey from Roche by one second. Meanwhile, Nibali, Horner, former Vuelta champ Alejandro Valverde and Joaquim Rodríguez were all within a minute of the lead.

Until this point in the race Directeur Sportif for Team Radioshack José Azevedo had considered Horner's statement declaring he could make the podium, but still ran the team with the plan he had come into the race with. Only after Horner won again on stage ten and reclaimed the red jersey did he declare full team support for the American for the rest of the race. Stage eleven was an individual time trial where Nibali put time into all of the riders close to him in the standings reclaiming the red jersey yet again.

Once again Nibali would maintain the lead for the next several stages. In stage eighteen Vasil Kiryienka would win the day as Horner took +0:25 out of Nibali to come within just three seconds of the lead. Stage nineteen saw the riders contend with the Monte Naranco where Rodríguez won the stage and pulled within a minute of Valverde for the final podium position. Horner took another six seconds from Nibali and reclaimed the red jersey by three seconds, but for all intents and purposes they were neck and neck going into the final mountain stage, which culminated on the Alto de l'Angliru. Rodríguez and Valverde were not far behind going into this decisive stage and if Nibali and Horner were to attack one another to the breaking point, either of these two riders could be in a position to steal the race. Horner was concerned about Nibali being considerably stronger than he was in the final sprint to the finish so his plan was to defeat him on the mountain. Nibali also intended to win on the mountain and he did attack Horner on numerous occasions, but Horner was able to seal his only grand tour victory by responding to every attack and eventually riding away from everyone except for the final surviving breakaway rider in Kenny Elissonde.

== Classification leadership table ==
There were four main classifications contested in the 2013 Vuelta a España, with the most important being the general classification. The general classification was calculated by adding each cyclist's finishing times on each stage. The cyclist with the least accumulated time was the race leader, identified by the red jersey; the winner of this classification was considered the winner of the Vuelta. In 2013, there were time bonuses given on mass-start stages; ten seconds were awarded to the stage winner, with six for second and four for third.

Additionally, there was a points classification, which awards a green jersey. In the points classification, cyclists get points for finishing among the best in a stage finish, or in intermediate sprints. The cyclist with the most points led the classification, and is identified with a green jersey. There was also a mountains classification. The organisation categorised some climbs as either hors catégorie, first, second, third, or fourth-category; points for this classification were won by the first cyclists that reach the top of these climbs, with more points available for the higher-categorised climbs. The cyclist with the most points led the classification, and was identified with a blue polka dot jersey.

The fourth individual classification was the combination classification, marked by the white jersey. This classification is calculated by adding the numeral ranks of each cyclist in the general, points and mountains classifications – a rider must have a score in all classifications possible to qualify for the combination classification – with the lowest cumulative total signifying the winner of this competition.

For the team classification, the times of the best three cyclists per team on each stage were added; the leading team is the team with the lowest total time. For the combativity award, a jury gives points after each stage to the cyclists they considered most combative. The cyclist with the most votes in all stages leads the classification. For the daily combative winner, the rider in question donned a dossard with a red background, on the following stage.

Stage	Winner	General classification	Points classification	Mountains classification	Combination classification	Team classification	Combativity award
1	Astana	Janez Brajkovič	not awarded	not awarded	not awarded	Astana	Janez Brajkovič
2	Nicolas Roche	Vincenzo Nibali	Nicolas Roche	Nicolas Roche	Nicolas Roche	RadioShack–Leopard	Alex Rasmussen
3	Chris Horner	Chris Horner	Nicolas Roche	Nicolas Roche	Nicolas Roche	RadioShack–Leopard	Pablo Urtasun
4	Daniel Moreno	Vincenzo Nibali	Daniel Moreno	Nicolas Roche	Nicolas Roche	RadioShack–Leopard	Nicolas Edet
5	Michael Matthews	Vincenzo Nibali	Daniel Moreno	Nicolas Roche	Nicolas Roche	RadioShack–Leopard	Antonio Piedra
6	Michael Mørkøv	Vincenzo Nibali	Michael Matthews	Nicolas Roche	Nicolas Roche	RadioShack–Leopard	Tony Martin
7	Zdeněk Štybar	Vincenzo Nibali	Michael Matthews	Nicolas Roche	Nicolas Roche	RadioShack–Leopard	Javier Aramendia
8	Leopold König	Nicolas Roche	Daniel Moreno	Nicolas Roche	Nicolas Roche	Saxo–Tinkoff	Antonio Piedra
9	Daniel Moreno	Daniel Moreno	Daniel Moreno	Nicolas Roche	Daniel Moreno	Movistar Team	Javier Aramendia
10	Chris Horner	Chris Horner	Daniel Moreno	Chris Horner	Chris Horner	Saxo–Tinkoff	Juan Antonio Flecha
11	Fabian Cancellara	Vincenzo Nibali	Daniel Moreno	Chris Horner	Nicolas Roche	Astana	Fabian Cancellara
12	Philippe Gilbert	Vincenzo Nibali	Daniel Moreno	Chris Horner	Nicolas Roche	Astana	Fabricio Ferrari
13	Warren Barguil	Vincenzo Nibali	Daniel Moreno	Chris Horner	Nicolas Roche	Astana	Michele Scarponi
14	Daniele Ratto	Vincenzo Nibali	Alejandro Valverde	Daniele Ratto	Chris Horner	Astana	Daniele Ratto
15	Alexandre Geniez	Vincenzo Nibali	Alejandro Valverde	Nicolas Edet	Chris Horner	Astana	Alexandre Geniez
16	Warren Barguil	Vincenzo Nibali	Alejandro Valverde	Nicolas Edet	Chris Horner	Euskaltel–Euskadi	Juan Antonio Flecha
17	Bauke Mollema	Vincenzo Nibali	Alejandro Valverde	Nicolas Edet	Chris Horner	Euskaltel–Euskadi	Javier Aramendia
18	Vasil Kiryienka	Vincenzo Nibali	Alejandro Valverde	Nicolas Edet	Chris Horner	Euskaltel–Euskadi	Egoi Martínez
19	Joaquim Rodríguez	Chris Horner	Alejandro Valverde	Nicolas Edet	Chris Horner	Euskaltel–Euskadi	Edvald Boasson Hagen
20	Kenny Elissonde	Chris Horner	Alejandro Valverde	Nicolas Edet	Chris Horner	Euskaltel–Euskadi	David Arroyo
21	Michael Matthews	Chris Horner	Alejandro Valverde	Nicolas Edet	Chris Horner	Euskaltel–Euskadi	not awarded
Final		Chris Horner	Alejandro Valverde	Nicolas Edet	Chris Horner	Euskaltel–Euskadi	Javier Aramendia

=== Margins between Horner and Nibali ===
Cycliste	1	2	3	4	5	6	7	8	9	10	11	12	13	14	15	16	17	18	19	20	21
Chris Horner	+10"	+10"	Gold medal	+3"	+3"	+3"	+3"		+8"	Gold medal	+46"	+46"	+46"	+50"	+50"	+28"	+28"	+3"			
Vincenzo Nibali	Gold medal		+3"					+1"		+43"									+3"	+37"	+37"

== Classification standings ==
Legend
Red jersey	Denotes the leader of the General classification	Blue polka dot jersey	Denotes the leader of the Mountains classification
Green jersey	Denotes the leader of the Points classification	White jersey	Denotes the leader of the Combination rider classification

=== General classification ===
	Rider	Team	Time
1	Chris Horner (USA)	RadioShack–Leopard	84h 36' 04"
2	Vincenzo Nibali (ITA)	Astana	+ 37"
3	Alejandro Valverde (ESP)	Movistar Team	+ 1' 36"
4	Joaquim Rodríguez (ESP)	Team Katusha	+ 3' 22"
5	Nicolas Roche (IRL)	Saxo–Tinkoff	+ 7' 11"
6	Domenico Pozzovivo (ITA)	Ag2r–La Mondiale	+ 8' 00"
7	Thibaut Pinot (FRA)	FDJ.fr	+ 8' 41"
8	Samuel Sánchez (ESP)	Euskaltel–Euskadi	+ 9' 51"
9	Leopold König (CZE)	NetApp–Endura	+ 10' 11"
10	Daniel Moreno (ESP)	Team Katusha	+ 13' 11"

=== Points classification ===
	Rider	Team	Points
1	Alejandro Valverde (ESP)	Movistar Team	152
2	Chris Horner (USA)	RadioShack–Leopard	126
3	Joaquim Rodríguez (ESP)	Team Katusha	125
4	Nicolas Roche (IRL)	Saxo–Tinkoff	122
5	Daniel Moreno (ESP)	Team Katusha	119
6	Vincenzo Nibali (ITA)	Astana	111
7	Maximiliano Richeze (ARG)	Lampre–Merida	84
8	Edvald Boasson Hagen (NOR)	Team Sky	83
9	Michael Matthews (AUS)	Orica–GreenEDGE	78
10	Bauke Mollema (NED)	Belkin Pro Cycling	75

=== King of the Mountains classification ===
	Rider	Team	Points
1	Nicolas Edet (FRA)	Cofidis	46
2	Chris Horner (USA)	RadioShack–Leopard	32
3	Daniele Ratto (ITA)	Cannondale	30
4	André Cardoso (POR)	Caja Rural–Seguros RGA	26
5	Vincenzo Nibali (ITA)	Astana	23
6	Amets Txurruka (ESP)	Caja Rural–Seguros RGA	22
7	Kenny Elissonde (FRA)	FDJ.fr	21
8	Nicolas Roche (IRL)	Saxo–Tinkoff	19
9	Vasil Kiryienka (BLR)	Team Sky	18
10	Michele Scarponi (ITA)	Lampre–Merida	17

=== Combination classification ===
	Rider	Team	Points
1	Chris Horner (USA)	RadioShack–Leopard	5
2	Vincenzo Nibali (ITA)	Astana	13
3	Alejandro Valverde (ESP)	Movistar Team	17
4	Nicolas Roche (IRL)	Saxo–Tinkoff	17
5	Joaquim Rodríguez (ESP)	Team Katusha	27
6	Daniel Moreno (ESP)	Team Katusha	32
7	Michele Scarponi (ITA)	Lampre–Merida	41
8	Leopold König (CZE)	NetApp–Endura	42
9	Domenico Pozzovivo (ITA)	Ag2r–La Mondiale	43
10	André Cardoso (POR)	Caja Rural–Seguros RGA	54

=== Team classification ===
Pos.	Team	Time
1	(Spain) Euskaltel–Euskadi	253h 29' 35"
2	(Spain) Movistar Team	+ 1' 02"
3	(Kazakhstan) Astana	+ 1' 30"
4	(Denmark) Saxo–Tinkoff	+ 9' 56"
5	(Spain) Caja Rural–Seguros RGA	+ 33' 48"
6	Team Katusha	+ 45' 21"
7	(Luxembourg) RadioShack–Leopard	+ 46' 54"
8	(Germany) NetApp–Endura	+ 52' 29"
9	(France) FDJ.fr	+ 1h 01' 21"
10	(United States) BMC Racing Team	+ 1h 56' 46"
