= Fabian Cancellara =

Swiss cyclist (born 1981)

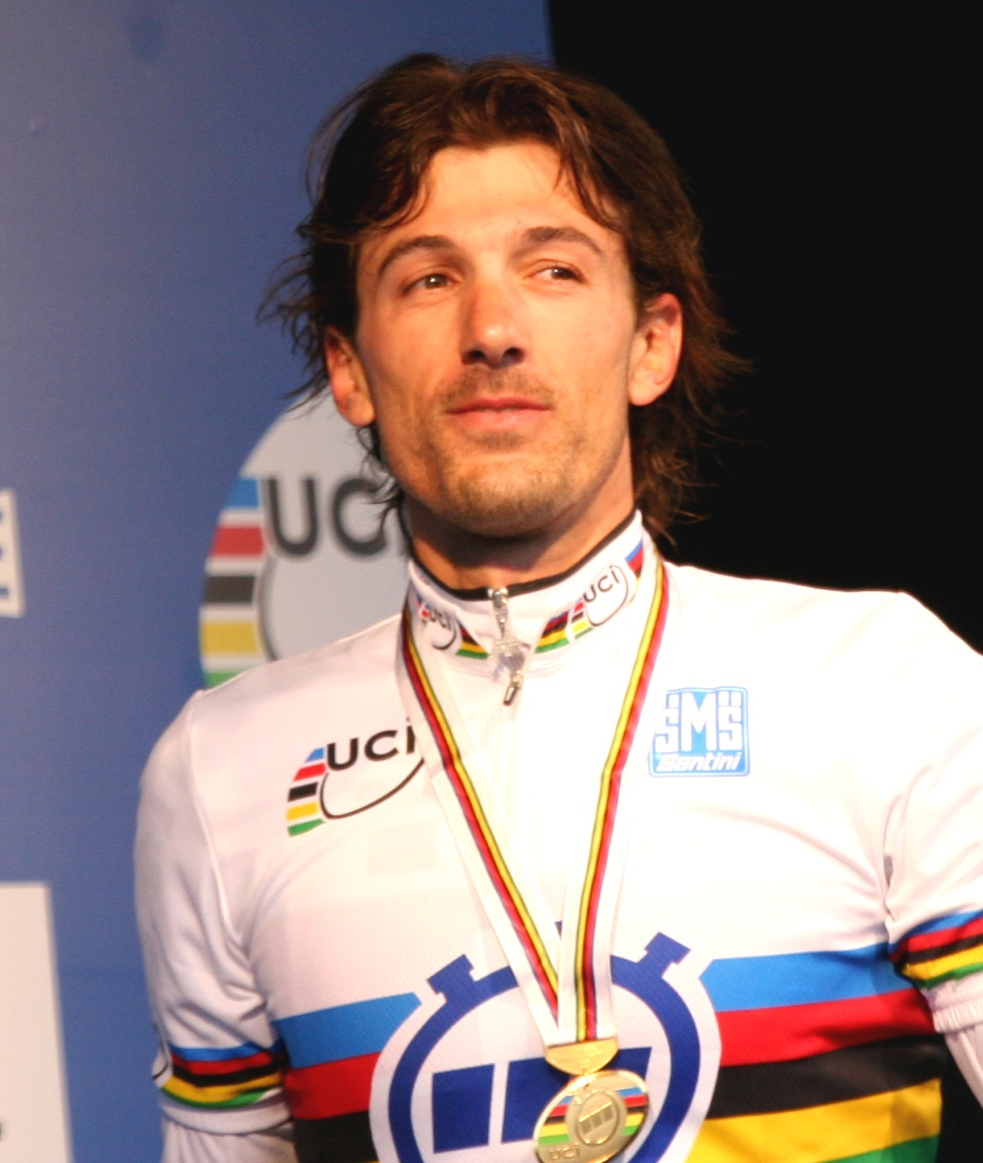
- Cancellara at the 2010 UCI Road World Championships

Personal information
- Full name: Fabian Cancellara
- Nickname: Spartacus
- Born: 18 March 1981 (age 45) Wohlen bei Bern, Switzerland
- Height: 1.86 m (6 ft 1 in)
- Weight: 78 kg (172 lb; 12 st 4 lb)

Cycling career
- Sport: Cycling
- Current team: Retired
- Discipline: Road
- Role: Rider
- Rider type: Time trialist Classics specialist

Amateur team
- 2000: Mapei–Quick-Step (stagiaire)

Professional teams
- 2001–2002: Mapei–Quick-Step
- 2003–2005: Fassa Bortolo
- 2006–2010: Team CSC
- 2011–2016: Leopard Trek

Major wins
- Grand Tours Tour de France 8 individual stages (2004, 2007–2010, 2012) Vuelta a España 3 individual stages (2009, 2013) 2 TTT stage (2006, 2011) Stage races Tirreno–Adriatico (2008) Tour de Suisse (2009) Danmark Rundt (2006) Tour of Oman (2010) One-day races and Classics Olympic Games Time Trial (2008, 2016) World Time Trial Championships (2006, 2007, 2009, 2010) National Road Race Championships (2009, 2011) National Time Trial Championships (2002, 2004–2008, 2012–2014, 2016) Paris–Roubaix (2006, 2010, 2013) Tour of Flanders (2010, 2013, 2014) Milan–San Remo (2008) Strade Bianche (2008, 2012, 2016) E3 Harelbeke (2010, 2011, 2013) Other Vélo d'Or (2010)
Medal record
Men's road bicycle racing
Representing Switzerland
Olympic Games
Gold medal – first place	2016 Rio de Janeiro	Time trial
Gold medal – first place	2008 Beijing	Time trial
Silver medal – second place	2008 Beijing	Road race
World Championships
Gold medal – first place	2010 Melbourne	Time trial
Gold medal – first place	2009 Mendrisio	Time trial
Gold medal – first place	2007 Stuttgart	Time trial
Gold medal – first place	2006 Salzburg	Time trial
Bronze medal – third place	2013 Florence	Time trial
Bronze medal – third place	2011 Copenhagen	Time trial
Bronze medal – third place	2005 Madrid	Time trial

Fabian Cancellara (born 18 March 1981), nicknamed "Spartacus", is a Swiss cycling executive, businessman and former professional road racing cyclist who last rode for UCI ProTeam Lidl–Trek. He is known for being a quality time trialist, a one-day classics specialist, and a workhorse for his teammates who have general classification aspirations.

He won two consecutive World Junior Time Trial Championships in 1998 and 1999. At age nineteen he turned professional and signed with the Mapei–Quick-Step team, where he rode as a stagiaire. After winning a few stages and small races in his starting years, Cancellara earned his first major victory at the 2004 Tour de France, where he won the opening prologue time trial and wore the race leader yellow jersey for one day. The following season saw fewer victories, but his 2006 season saw a victory in the men's time trial at the UCI Road World Championships, along with victory at the Paris–Roubaix. Cancellara repeated as world champion in the time trial the next year, along with winning two stages at the Tour de France.

During the 2008 calendar he won gold at the Summer Olympics in the individual time trial event and the Milan–San Remo. The next season saw Cancellara again become world time trial champion and lead both the Tour de France and the Vuelta a España. In 2010, he won the Paris–Roubaix and the Tour of Flanders. Cancellara's 2011 and 2012 campaigns were both short in number of victories, while the latter was hampered by injuries throughout. After a lackluster two-year period, Cancellara again won the Tour of Flanders and Paris–Roubaix double in 2013. In 2014, Cancellara repeated as winner of the Tour of Flanders.

Since turning professional in 2000, Cancellara has ridden for four professional teams. He has achieved great success in the classic monuments; he has won Paris–Roubaix three times, the Milan–San Remo once, and the Tour of Flanders three times. Cancellara has won the opening stage of the Tour de France five times and has led the race for 29 days total, which is the most of any rider who has not won the Tour. His success has not been limited to just time trials and classics, as he has won general classification of the Tirreno–Adriatico, Tour de Suisse, and the Tour of Oman. In 2008, he won gold in the individual time trial and silver in the men's road race at the Summer Olympics. In 2016, he won Olympic gold in the individual time trial for the second time in his career. In addition, Cancellara has been the time trial world champion four times in his career.

== Early life and amateur career ==
Fabian Cancellara was born on 18 March 1981, in Wohlen bei Bern, Switzerland, to a Swiss mother and an Italian Swiss father. He discovered cycling at the age of 13 after falling in love with an old family bike that he had found in the garage and immediately gave up football to concentrate on cycling. In addition, Cancellara excelled at cross-country skiing during his youth.

Cancellara's cycling skills began to blossom at an early age, when he impressed as a time trialist and dominated Swiss junior cycling. Yvan Girard, Swiss national junior team coach from 1997 to 2005, was quoted saying that Cancellara was "head and shoulders above everyone else" in the time trials. He won the junior World Time Trial Championship in both 1998 and 1999 and at the age of 19 he came in second at the 2000 U-23 World Time Trial Championship.

== Professional career ==
=== 2000–2002: The beginning years ===
After his second-place finish at the Under-23 time trial championship, Cancellara turned professional with Mapei–Quick-Step, which was one of the strongest teams in the world at the time. Cancellara rode as a stagiaire for the Mapei–Quick-Step team in late 2000 before joining the team for the 2001 season as a member of the "Young Riders Project". Cancellara's first victory as a professional came at the prologue of the Tour of Rhodes, where he also won the overall final general classification.

For 2002 the Mapei team split into two formations per UCI regulations, the "Top Team" with 25 riders and the GS-III "Gruppo Giovani" (youth group) to develop young talents, which Cancellara joined with other riders including Filippo Pozzato, Michael Rogers and Bernhard Eisel. Giorgio Squinzi, the head of Mapei firm, later said in an interview with La Gazzetta dello Sport that he took Cancellara and Pozzato all the way from the Junior category to Mapei's top team, in order to let them avoid the Under-23 category where he suggested that doping was even worse than among professionals. Squinzi also said that Cancellara was going to be "The future Miguel Induráin". During his two seasons with Mapei, Cancellara used his time trialling skills to great effect, winning several individual time trials and a total of eleven victories.

=== 2003–2005: On the rise ===
Following the folding of Mapei–Quick-Step at the end of the 2002 season, Cancellara joined Fassa Bortolo to work as a lead-out man for Alessandro Petacchi in 2003. Cancellara's first victory came Tour Méditerranéen; he helped lead the Fassa Bortolo squad to victory in the race's final stage, which was a team time trial. On 6 April, Cancellara raced his first ever classic in the Tour of Flanders. He finished in the 73rd place and over ten minutes behind the winner. His next success came in the brief 3.4 kilometres (2.1 mi) prologue at the Tour de Romandie. Cancellara was a consistent finisher throughout the race and because of that, he won the points classification for the Tour de Romandie. Next, he won the stage four individual time trial at the Tour of Belgium by a margin of ten seconds over the second-place finisher. His final victory of the season came in the Tour de Suisse's prologue, where he beat out Spaniard Óscar Pereiro by a little over a second for the win.

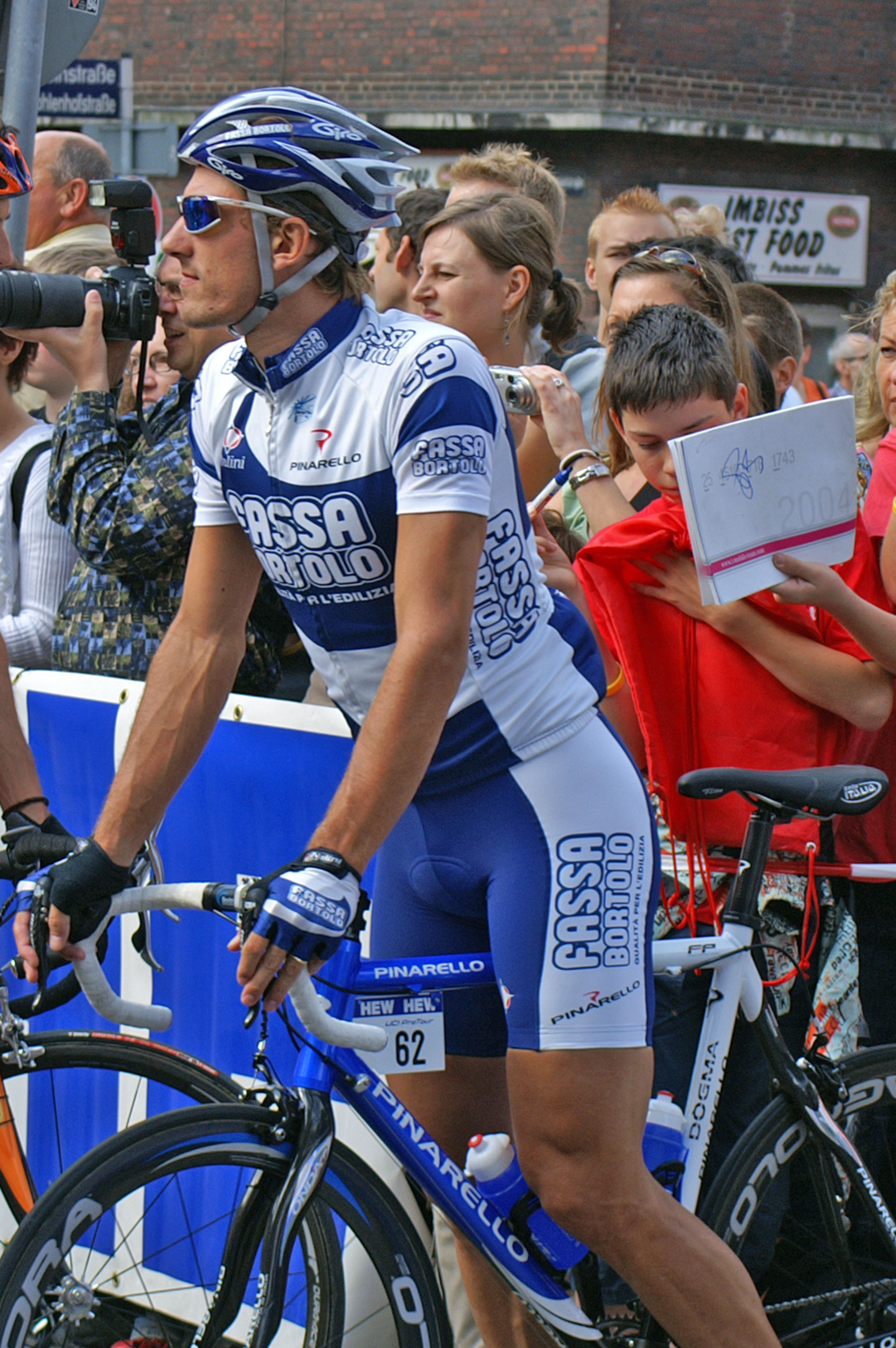
Cancellara at the 2005 HEW-Cyclassics.

Cancellara earned his first victory in 2004 at the Tour of Qatar. Cancellara won the race's fourth stage after attacking in the final kilometers of the race and then out-sprinting the riders who were able to keep pace with him to win the stage. His next victory came in the first stage of the Setmana Catalana de Ciclisme, where he won the opening stage's bunch sprint. Up next on the calendar for Cancellara was the Tour of Flanders. Cancellara crossed the line in 42nd place, just a little over two minutes after the winner Steffen Wesemann. The next weekend, he raced the Paris–Roubaix for the second time. Cancellara showed great form during the race and was a member of the four-man group that was first to reach the finish line. He lost the sprint to the line and crossed the line in fourth. Cancellara's next success came in the Tour de Luxembourg, where he won the stage four individual time trial by fourteen seconds over the second-place finisher. He then went on to win his second Swiss National Time Trial Championship in late June. Cancellara's next success came at the Tour de France. He won the prologue around the Belgian city of Liege and took the first yellow jersey as leader of the general classification. Cancellara lost the lead after the second stage to Thor Hushovd. Cancellara did participate in both the time trial and road race at the Road World Championships. Cancellara performed well in the time trial and came in eighth place; he finished over two minutes behind the winner. He entered the men's road race four days later, but did not finish the course.

Cancellara's first victory of the 2005 season came in the Paris–Nice, where he won the fourth stage after out-sprinting his fellow breakaway member Jaan Kirsipuu for the stage win. Up next for Cancellara was the Setmana-Catalana. There he won the race's final stage, an individual time trial by seven seconds over American Tom Danielson. After Setmana-Catalana, he raced the Tour of Flanders and finished 42nd overall and over ten minutes behind the winner Tom Boonen. The next weekend, he raced Paris–Roubaix where he finished in eighth place after a flat tire killed his chances of winning the race. Cancellara's next victory came in the Tour de Luxembourg, when he won the stage 3b individual time trial. He finished the Tour with the same time as the winner László Bodrogi, but was given second overall by the organizers. After the Tour de Luxembourg, Cancellara won the Swiss National Time Trial Championship for the third time. Cancellara then started the Tour de France, but did not win any stages at the race. After the Tour, he then rode the HEW-Cyclassics where he finished in fourth place amidst the bunch sprint for the race win. Cancellara then competed in the road race and the time trial at the Road World Championships. Cancellara finished in third place in the time trial event and missed out on a silver second place medal by twelve hundredths of a second. Three days later, he finished the road race in 123rd place and over ten minutes behind the winner.

=== 2006: First classic win ===
Cancellara's team, Fassa Bortolo, disbanded after the 2005 cycling season. Cancellara signed a three-year contract with Team CSC during the 2005 Tour de France. Cancellara's first victory with his new team came in the stage five individual time trial at the Tirreno–Adriatico. He then raced the Milan–San Remo, where he finished with the same time as winner Filippo Pozzato but 24 places behind. A week later, Cancellara lined up to start the E3 Prijs Vlaanderen. He figured into the early breakaway and led the race for a good distance before being caught and ultimately finishing in 37th place. Up next for Cancellara was the Tour of Flanders. He finished sixth overall after being in the lead chase group that was in pursuit of the winner Tom Boonen and second-place finisher Leif Hoste. The next weekend, Cancellara rode his final classic of the season in the Paris–Roubaix. Cancellara was in the leading group of riders for most of the stage. When the race reached the Carrefour de l'Arbre, he powered away from Vladimir Gusev and went on by himself to win the race itself. On 9 April, he celebrated his first classic victory in his career.

His next victory came in the stage one individual time trial at the Volta a Catalunya. In late June, Cancellara won his third straight Swiss National Time Trial champion title. He was not selected to ride with Team CSC at the Tour de France. Outside of repeating as time trial champion in June, Cancellara had a quiet June and July. Cancellara's next victories of the season came at the Danmark Rundt. He won the second stage and took the race lead after riding solo to victory. He expanded his lead after winning the stage fifth time trial by eighteen seconds over the second-placed finisher. The next day, he won the race after completing the final stage. In addition to the race's general classification, he also won the youth classification. Later that month, he rode the Vuelta a España and helped his team with the opening team time trial. After the Vuelta, Canacellara competed in the elite men's time trial and road race at the UCI Road World Championships. On 21 September, Cancellara won the men's time trial event by over a minute to American David Zabriskie and became the world champion of the time trial discipline. Three days later, he finished the road race in 31st place.

=== 2007: Success in summer and autumn ===
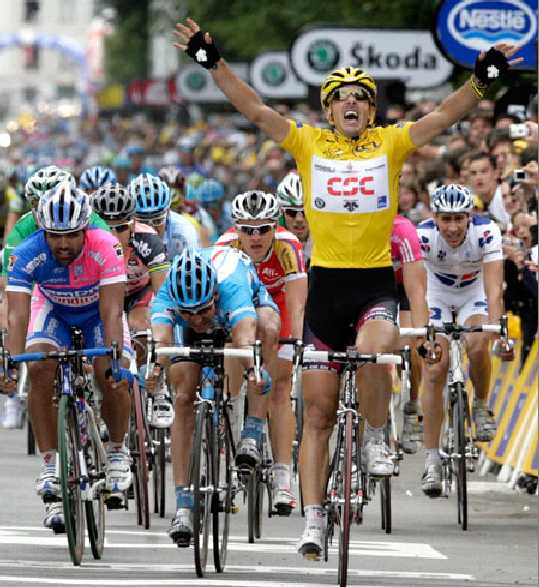
Cancellara winning stage three of the 2007 Tour de France whilst wearing the race leader's yellow jersey

The early portion of Cancellara's 2007 campaign began with no victories to his credit. He started the Tour of California and came closest to a stage win in stage five time trial, where he finished in fourth place. He finished in 119th place in the Milan–San Remo, over six minutes behind the winner Óscar Freire. The next week, Cancellara lined up to race the E3 Prijs Vlaanderen. He missed out on the victory after Belgian rider Tom Boonen edged out Cancellara for the win. Eight days later, Cancellara raced the Tour of Flanders and came in 53rd place after his moves were not successful. The last classic Cancellara raced in the 2007 season was the famed Paris–Roubaix, which he finished in 19th place.

After the slow start to the season, Cancellara began to achieve success in June. He rode the Tour de Suisse and won the opening time trial, along with the final stage that was also a time trial. With the opening stage victory in the Tour de Suisse, Cancellara led the race for a few stages before losing it to teammate Fränk Schleck after stage four. Cancellara continued his success in the time trial with a victory in the Swiss national time trial.

Cancellara won the prologue of the Tour de France in London, defeating Andreas Klöden of Astana by thirteen seconds. During stage two, he was caught up in a very large crash which brought down an estimated thirty riders. He crossed the finish line nursing his left hand but appeared to be fine during the yellow jersey presentation. The next day, he won the third stage in Compiègne after he caught and overtook the breakaway group just 500 metres (1,640.4 ft) from the finish line. Cancellara held the yellow jersey until stage seven, the Tour's first mountain stage.

Cancellara returned to the Road World Championships in September with the aims to defend his time trial crown. He achieved his goal and won the time trial by 52 seconds over second-place finisher László Bodrogi. Three days later, Cancellara raced the road race, but did not finish the course.

=== 2008: Olympic champion ===
Cancellara won the prologue of the Tour of California ahead of Olympic track gold medalist Bradley Wiggins in his first race of the season. Two weeks later, he won the second edition of Italian Monte Paschi Eroica ahead of Italian rider Alessandro Ballan. Cancellara then rode the Tirreno–Adriatico where he won stage five time trial to Recanati, which allowed him to take the race lead. Cancellara would go on to win the race by sixteen seconds over the second place rider. Just a few days later in the Milan–San Remo classic monument race, Cancellara broke away from a leading group in the final kilometres to win the race, thus becoming just the second Swiss rider triumphant in this race, after Erich Maechler in 1987. At Paris–Roubaix, Cancellara finished second after being out-sprinted by the winner Boonen.

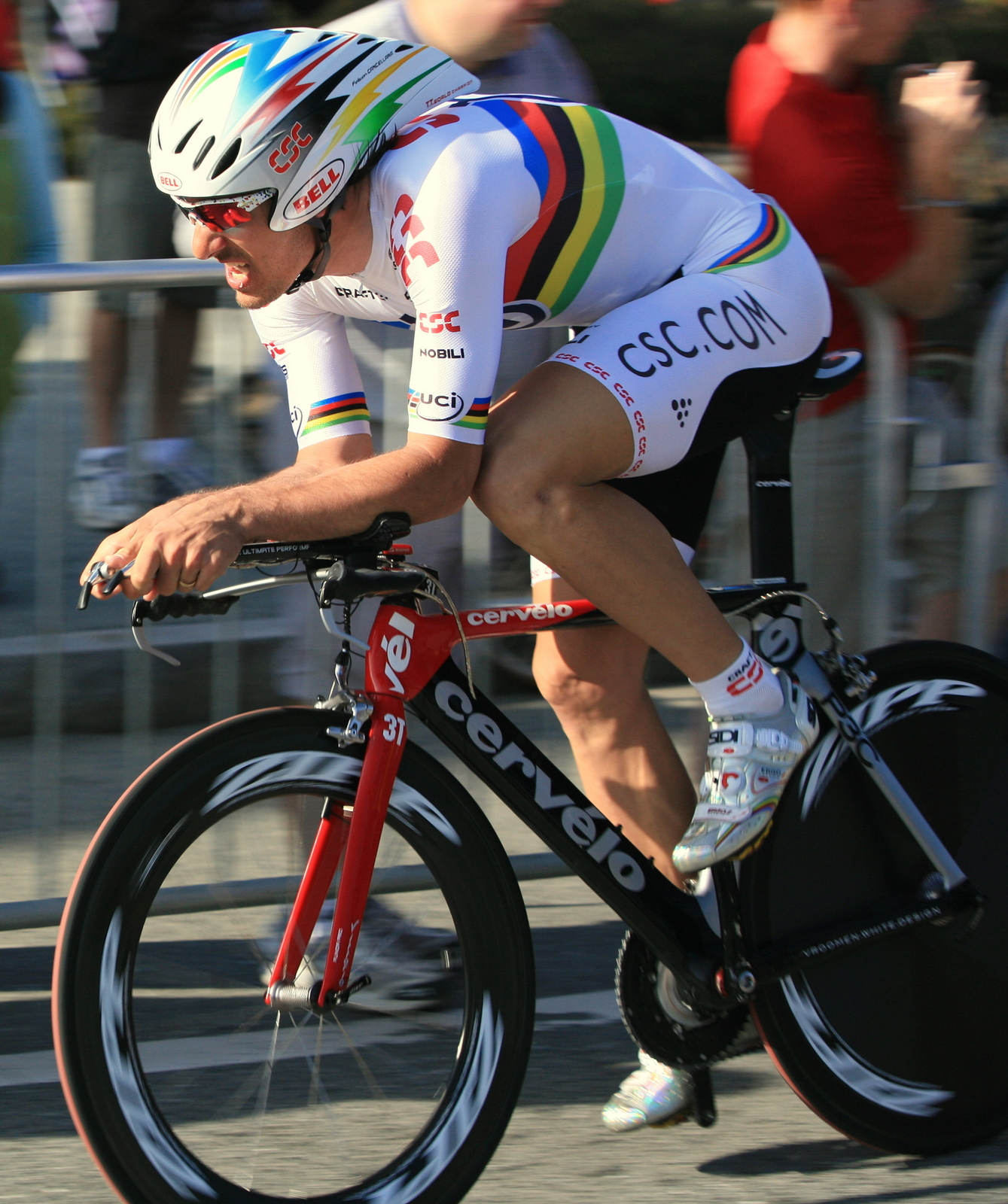
Cancellara at the 2008 Tour of California, where he won the prologue stage.

In preparation for the second half of the season, Cancellara rode the Tour de Luxembourg and the Tour de Suisse. Cancellara won the prologue of the Tour de Luxembourg and briefly held the overall lead because of the victory. After finishing the Tour de Luxembourg, he started the Tour de Suisse where he saw great success. Cancellara won the seventh and ninth stages through attacks in the closing kilometers of each stage. In addition to the two stage wins, he also won the points classification. Cancellara joined his team at the Tour de France. Cancellara proved to be a valuable asset to the squad as he helped his teammate Carlos Sastre to overall victory at the Tour. Cancellara was later awarded the stage win in the penultimate stage after the initial winner, Stefan Schumacher, tested positive for EPO.

In the Olympic Road Race in Beijing, Cancellara was in a chasing group with around 5 km (3.1 mi) before he attacked and successfully bridged the gap to the leading group when 1 km (0.62 mi) was left to race. The race then came down to a sprint finish that was won by the Samuel Sánchez, with Davide Rebellin coming in second and Cancellara coming in third for a bronze medal. However, later it was found that Rebellin had tested positive for Continuous erythropoietin receptor activator (CERA, a third-generation form of erythropoietin) and his medal was removed by both the UCI and the IOC. Cancellara was subsequently promoted to second place, and the initial fourth-place finisher Alexandr Kolobnev was promoted to third place. The riders did not initially receive new medals for their new placings. On 18 December 2010, Cancellara received the same physical medal initially given to Rebellin, in a ceremony held in his hometown of Ittigen, Switzerland. Cancellara's bronze was then given to Kolobnev. Four days after racing the road race, Cancellara raced the time trial event. He won the gold medal by winning the race by over thirty seconds to Swedish rider Gustav Larsson. After finishing with the Olympics, Cancellara decided not to defend his world time trial title in Varese due to mental fatigue. For his successes on the road in the 2008 season, Cancellara was named the Swiss Male Athlete of the Year at the Credit Suisse Sports Awards on 6 December 2008.

=== 2009: Domination in the time trial ===
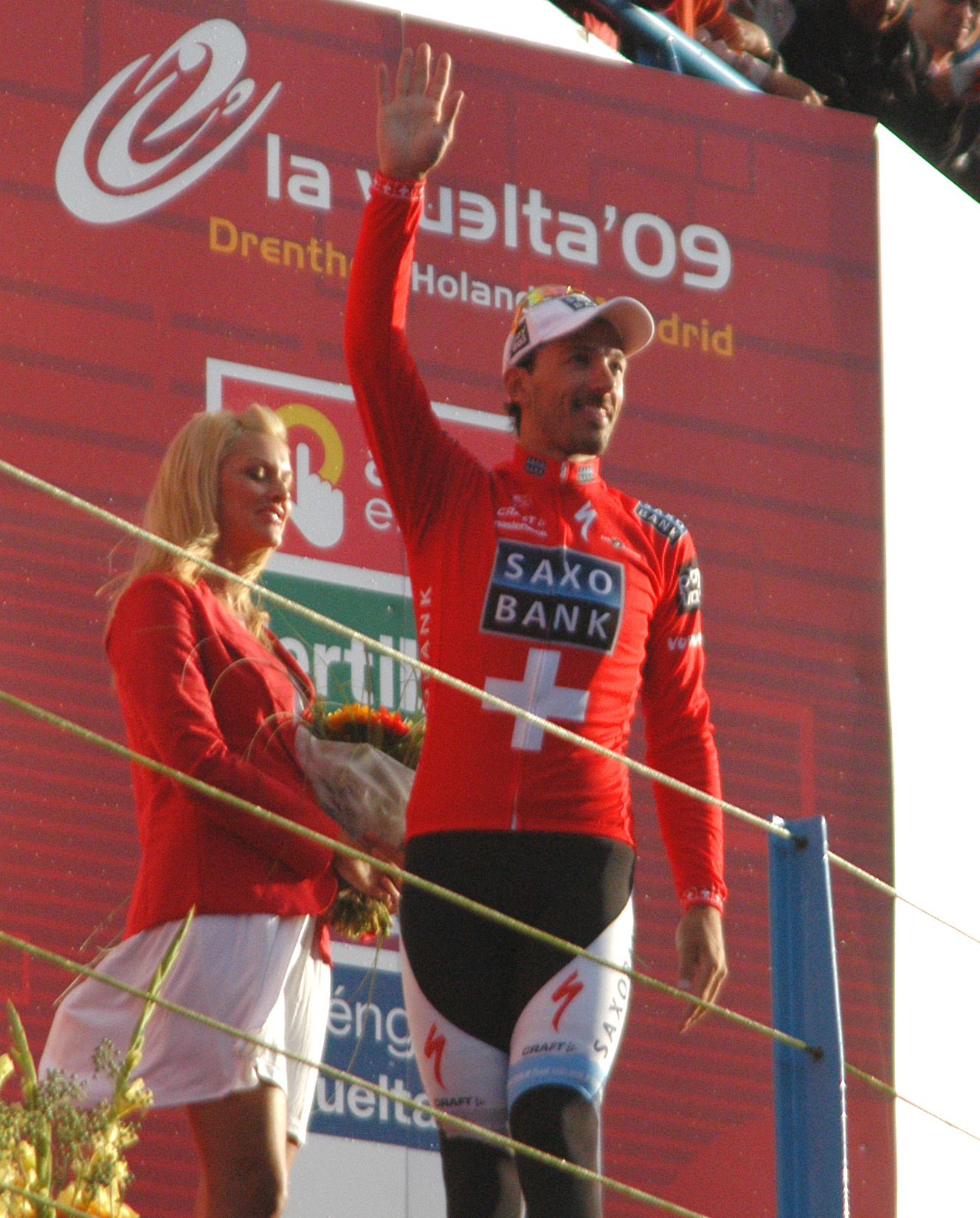
Cancellara on the victory platform after winning the first stage of the 2009 Vuelta a España

Cancellara's first victory of the 2009 season came in the prologue of the Tour of California. This was his second victory in a row in the prologue at the Tour of California. Cancellara then returned to the Tirreno–Adriatico, but an injury prevented his efforts to repeat as winner of the event. Cancellara did not finish the sixth stage of the race; he left the event without winning a single stage. Poor performance marred the early portion of the season for Cancellara as he achieved no success in the early season classics; he did not finish the Tour of Flanders after suffering problem with his bike chain early in the race, on the Koppenberg, and he finished 49th overall in the Paris–Roubaix.

Cancellara began to achieve success in June, during the Tour de Suisse. He won the opening time trial of the race and the time trial on stage nine en route to his overall victory. In addition to the general classification, he also won the secondary points classification of the Tour de Suisse. A week after finishing the Tour de Suisse, he won his first Swiss national road racing crown on 28 June after outsprinting Mathias Frank at the line. He continued to win in July, as he won the opening stage of the Tour de France and took the first yellow jersey of the race. He then successfully defended the lead until the seventh stage, when he was unable to bridge the gap to the leaders on the Arcalis mountain-top finish.

Cancellara's next victories season came at the Vuelta a España. He won the opening time trial and then held the lead of the race until the race's fourth stage. Cancellara briefly regained the lead of the race after winning the time trial on stage seven, but he lost the lead after the next stage's conclusion.

The Road World Championships took place in Cancellara's native country Switzerland and he stated that he wished to win both events. Cancellara dominated the time trial event and won by a margin of close a minute and a half over the second-place finisher. This was Cancellara's third world championship in the time trial discipline, which was tied for most ever with Australia's Michael Rogers. Cancellara's next goal was the road race, which was to take place three days later. During the final lap of the race, Cancellara crossed the gap to the race's leading group that had just formed. At the bottom of the final climb Cadel Evans (Australia) attacked, but no other riders reacted. Cancellara crossed the line in fifth.

=== 2010: Victories abound ===
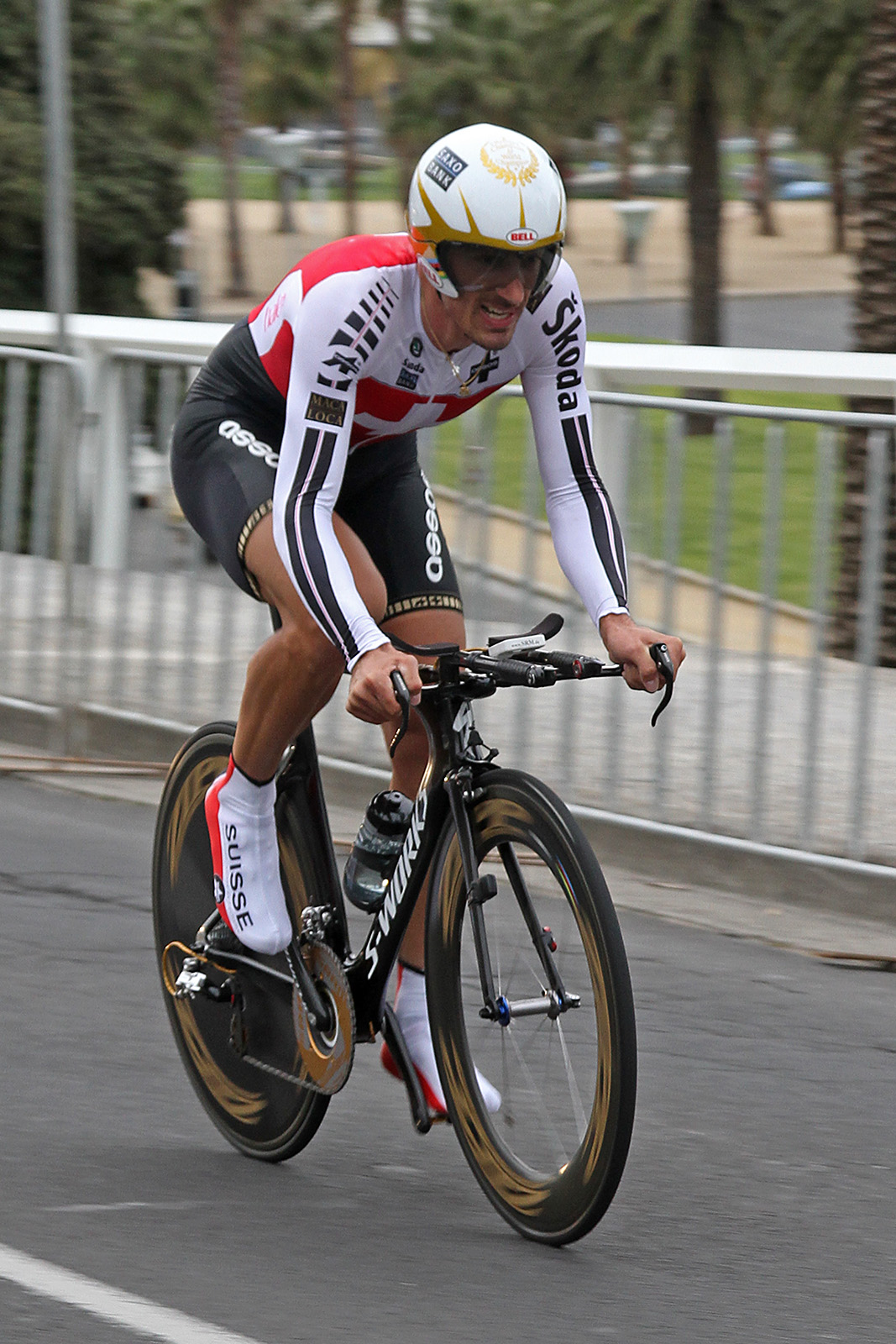
Cancellara riding his bike during the time trial at the Road World Championships

Fabian Cancellara kicked off his 2010 campaign with an overall victory at the Tour of Oman. He gained the lead after the race's final stage and won the race without winning a single stage. In late March, Cancellara won the E3 Prijs Vlaanderen after riding away from Boonen and Juan Antonio Flecha with about 2 kilometres (1.2 mi) remaining in the race. On 4 April he raced the famed Tour of Flanders. Cancellara first attacked in the race on the Molenberg with about 44 kilometres (27.3 mi) remaining in the race and only Boonen was able to mark his efforts. Cancellara's second major attack took place on the steepest part of the Muur van Geraardsbergen. The attack proved successful as he was able to drop Boonen and solo on to the victory. By winning the Tour of Flanders, he became the twelfth cyclist to win the opening three monuments of the cycling year – Milan–San Remo, Tour of Flanders, and the Paris–Roubaix – in a career. After winning the Tour of Flanders, Cancellara stated that he wished to win the other two cycling monuments: the Liège–Bastogne–Liège and the Giro di Lombardia.

Just a week after his victory at the Tour of Flanders, Cancellara raced the Paris–Roubaix. Cancellara made a move during the Mons-en-Pévèle portion of the race with more than 50 kilometres (31.1 mi) to go in the race and no one was able to match his efforts. Cancellara then rode solo all the way to the finish in the Roubaix Velodrome and finished two minutes ahead the second-place finisher Thor Hushovd. After winning the Roubaix, Cancellara decided to skip the rest of the classics to race the Tour of California as part of his warm up for the Tour de France. He completed the Tour of California without winning a single stage.

Cancellara's next victory came at the Tour de Suisse where he won the prologue, which was an individual time trial around the city of Lugano. Cancellara came close to another stage win in the stage nine individual time trial, but fell short by seventeen seconds. Next, Cancellara won the prologue of the Tour de France. He then held the lead until the second stage came to an end, after stage winner Sylvain Chavanel took it away. However, Cancellara regained the lead the after the next day and held it until stage seven when Chavanel again took the lead. Later in the Tour, Cancellara won the stage nineteen individual time trial that stretched from Bordeaux to Pauillac by seventeen seconds over German rider Tony Martin.

The Road World Championships took place in Melbourne and Cancellara returned to the event to defend his title as world champion of the time trial discipline. He won the time trial by over a minute to the second-place finisher and in doing so, he became the first four-time men's world champion of the time trial. Four days later, he competed in the road race and finished 50th overall.

==== Allegation of 'mechanical doping' ====
In 2010, former cyclist Davide Cassani claimed in a YouTube video that Fabian Cancellara had used a motorized bike during his victories at the Tour of Flanders and the Paris–Roubaix that year. In the video, Cassani showed a normal road bike on a stand and after he pressed a button, the pedals began to rotate. Cassani then alleged that a motor could easily be stowed in the seattube of the bike and the button to turn it on would be located on the handlebars. In the YouTube video, Cassani showed clips of Cancellara at the two races allegedly "turning on" the motor while riding and showing the drastic increase in speed. The claims caught steam since rumors were already going around about riders possibly using the new motor, the Gruber Assist, which could produce 100 Watts of power to aid the rider. Critics of the motor-theory often say that the Gruber Assist was way too noisy at that time and in solo ride or a smaller group it could have surely been heard when turned on.

The Union Cycliste Internationale (UCI) stated that whilst they are not investigating any specific teams or riders, it would review the need for a new bicycle inspection system to detect such cheating. Then UCI stated that there was no case against Cancellara after the claims gained prominence. Cancellara dismissed Cassani's claims saying that they were "stupid" and far too risky to do. He even told the Belgian newspaper Het Nieuwsblad that he had "never had batteries on [his] bike."

During an April 2017 press conference, just before his final Ronde van Vlaanderen, Tom Boonen was asked if it was always the strongest rider who wins the Tour of Flanders. "Yes, most of the time", he said. "In every race like that, it is not always the strongest that wins, but most of the time it is. In Flanders, I can't really recall one year... Well, I can recall one year..." When asked what year he was referring to, Boonen smiled and replied "No comment". On 6 April, two days before the 2018 Paris–Roubaix, Samuël Grulois of Radio Télévision Belge Francophone (RTBF) asked Boonen if he believed Cancellara had used a motor to beat him in 2010: "Did Cancellara steal the 2010 Flanders due to a motor? Is there any doubt?" Boonen replied "Yes", and added "But it's not for me to say. I finished second, and it's not the one in second who has to say the situation is not normal. It's very difficult to prove because we do not have the bike to check. It's too late".

=== 2011: Close, but no victories ===
This was Cancellara's first year with his new team Leopard Trek, which lacked the high caliber domestiques that Cancellara had in the past, meaning that winning would be tougher for Cancellara. His first major race of the year was the Tirreno–Adriatico, where he won the race's final stage which was an individual time trial. Cancellara came to the Milan–San Remo with the hopes of winning the race a second time. He positioned himself in an eight-man breakaway that made it all the way to the finish. As the group approached the finish line, Cancellara was bested in the sprint for the line by Australian Matthew Goss and Cancellara crossed the line in second.

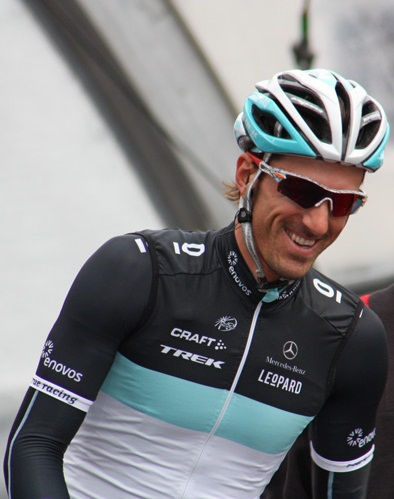
Cancellara at the start of the 2011 Tour of Flanders

Cancellara was seen as the favorite or top contender for the next three one day races – the E3 Prijs Vlaanderen–Harelbeke, the Tour of Flanders, and the Paris–Roubaix – due to his great performance in the 2010 season and his good form in the early portion of the 2011 season. He lived up to his expectations and won the E3 Prijs Vlaanderen – Harelbeke after having several flat tires and a few bike changes, he launched a solo attack with 16 kilometres (9.9 mi) and rode by himself to the finish line for the victory. The next weekend, Cancellara began the Tour of Flanders. He launched an attack with about 60 kilometres (37.3 mi) left to go in the race and caught up with the leader Sylvain Chavanel; however, Cancellara cracked after Chavanel did not help with the pacing and the two were picked up by a chasing group on the Muur van Geraardsbergen. With 4 kilometres (2.5 mi) left in the race, Cancellara launched two attacks. His first attack was marked by the whole group, while his second attack could only be matched by Chavanel and Nick Nuyens. The three rode into the finish together, with Nuyens taking the win, Chavanel second, and Cancellara third. The Paris–Roubaix was next on the calendar for Cancellara. Cancellara finished in second place after a crash hurt him early on, as did being a member of a chasing group that did not work with him to catch the leading riders.

On 1 June, Cancellara began the Tour de Luxembourg. He won the prologue and was the first to wear the race leader's yellow jersey. He then held the lead until the second stage came to a close when stage winner Linus Gerdemann took the lead away from him. Cancellara then raced the Tour de Suisse and won the opening and closing stages of the race, which were both individual time trials. He then closed out June by winning the Swiss National Road Race after he out-sprinted Steve Morabito for the win, which was his second Swiss National Road Race title.

Cancellara entered the Tour de France in July, but was unable to come away with a victory in either the team time trial or the lone individual time trial. Up next for Cancellara was the Vuelta a España, where he helped his team achieve victory in the stage one's team time trial. Cancellara's final events for the 2011 season were the road race and the time trial at the Road World Championships. Cancellara came with the hopes of winning a third consecutive time trial world crown; however, he would finish in third place after the winner Martin and runner-up Wiggins. Four days later, Cancellara lined up to race the road race. The race came down to a sprint finish that was won by Mark Cavendish; Cancellara barely missed a medal after finishing in fourth place.

=== 2012: An injury-ridden season ===
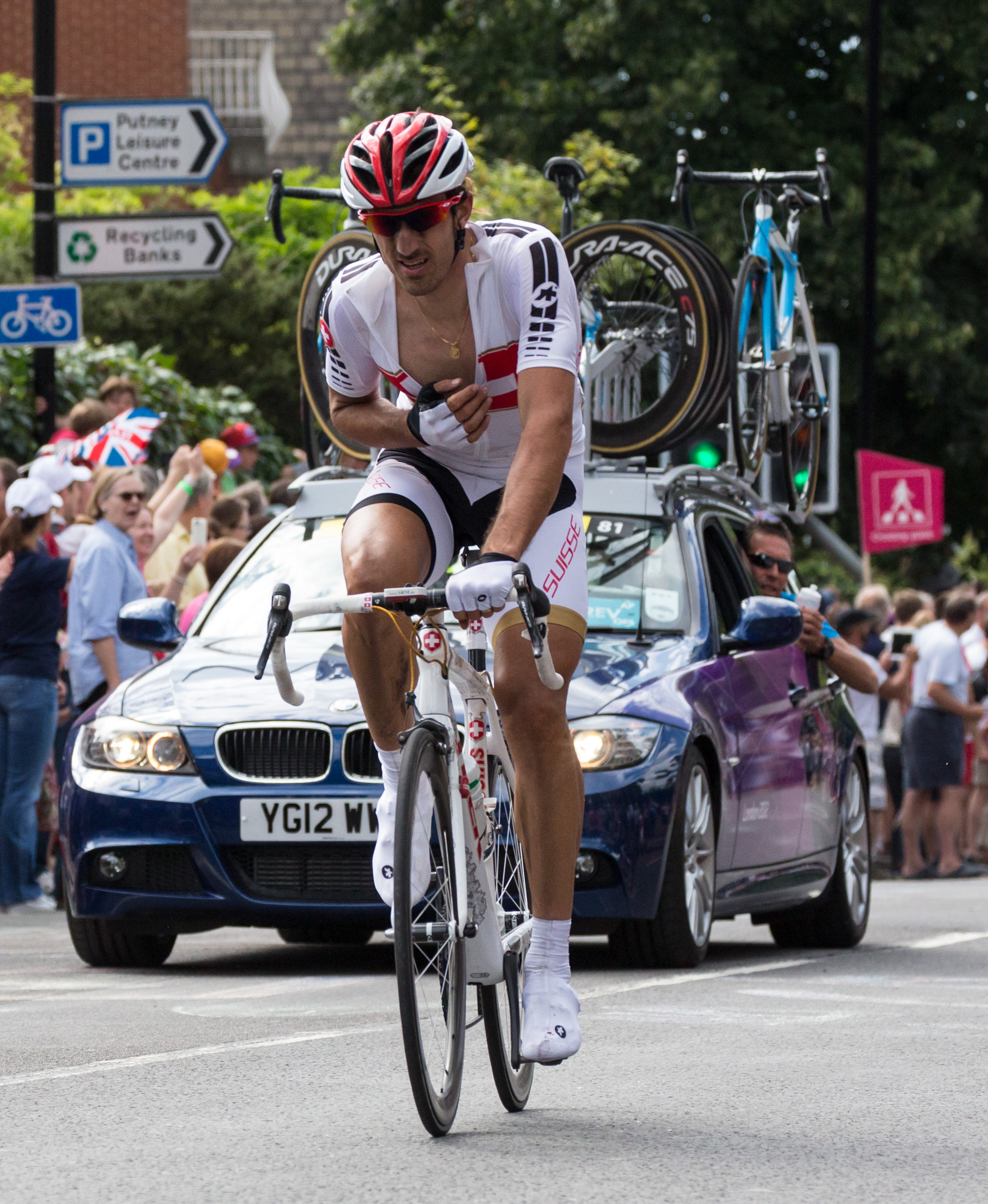
Cancellara riding his bike while nursing his right arm after hurting it in a crash earlier in the Olympic road race.

In the first races of the 2012 season, Cancellara showed a good form: he powered to a second victory on the gravel roads of the Strade Bianche and took a victory in the closing time trial of the Tirreno–Adriatico. In the final of the first monument of the year, Milan–San Remo, he was the strongest rider during the descent of the Poggio, but was outsprinted for victory by Simon Gerrans. He was in great form for the Belgian spring classics, but a fall and material malfunction kept him from playing a part in the final of both the E3 Harelbeke and Gent–Wevelgem. Cancellara was one of the favourites to win the renewed Tour of Flanders but played no part in the final due to a crash in the feed zone. It was caused by a discarded water bottle. He suffered a four-part fracture of the right collarbone which ruined his spring campaign.

He came back to competition on 10 June in his homeland, racing in the Tour de Suisse. Cancellara stated that he was nervous before the start of the prologue, which he finished in second position, four seconds behind the winner, Liquigas–Cannondale's Peter Sagan.

In the Tour de France, Cancellara won the opening-day prologue in Liège; his fifth such victory in the Tour. After his fifth day in the yellow jersey in the race, Cancellara broke René Vietto's longstanding record as the rider with the most career yellow jerseys who has not won the Tour overall. He subsequently lost the jersey to Wiggins of Team Sky after conceding almost two minutes on the seventh stage, which finished on top of a steep Category 1 climb leading to Planche des Belles Filles. He withdrew from the Tour after the eleventh stage to return home to support his wife before the birth of their second child.

Cancellara returned to compete in the road race at the Olympic Games. He was the leading rider of a massive breakaway when he badly negotiated a right turn with about 15 kilometres (9.3 mi) to cover and fell heavily on his right shoulder. He completed the race, finishing approximately five minutes after the winner, the Kazakh Alexander Vinokourov, but was in obvious pain and could not hold his handlebar properly with his right hand. As he crossed the line, he was in tears and was sent to the hospital where it was revealed that he did not suffer any fractures. Two days after the incident, it was announced that he would be able to defend his Olympic Time Trial title, an event he subsequently finished in seventh. In August, Cancellara announced that he was putting an end to his 2012 season. He required further surgery on his collarbone to get the stabilizing vises out of his body.

=== 2013: Return to form ===
Cancellara began the 2013 campaign with the Tour of Qatar and the Tour of Oman, but failed to collect any victories. After finishing the aforementioned tours, he raced the Strade Bianche and finished in fourth place. Next, Cancellara raced the Tirreno–Adriatico. He came close to a stage victory in the race's stage seven individual time trial, but missed the win by twelve seconds. Just five days later, Cancellara lined up at the Milan–San Remo, where he was considered by many as a favorite to win the race. The race was marred by poor weather conditions, but Cancellara remained near the front and managed to place third overall after losing out in the sprint for the finish line.

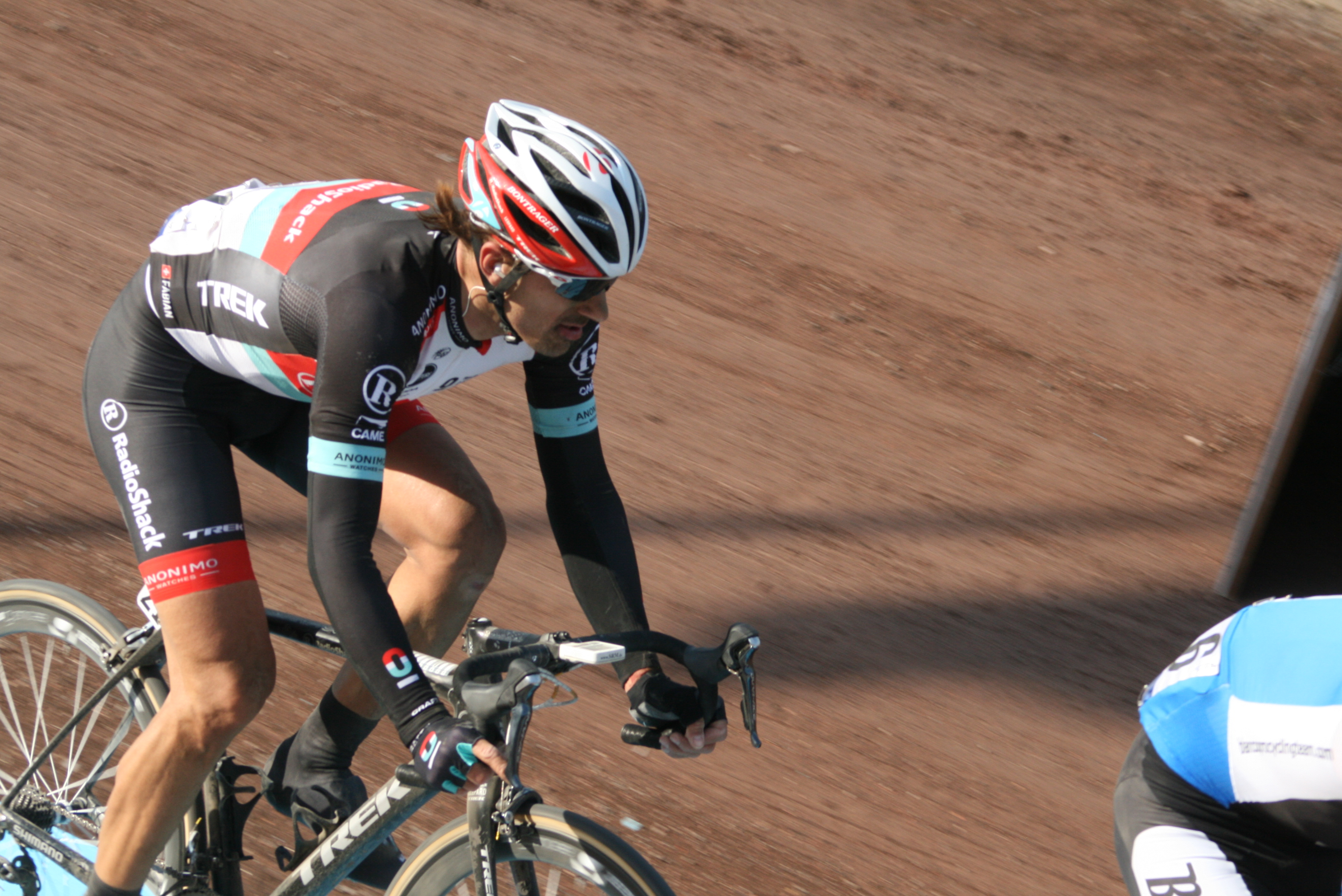
Cancellara in the closing kilometer of the 2013 Paris–Roubaix in the Roubaix Velodrome.

His first win of the year came in E3 Harelbeke, after an attack on Oude Kwaremont, with 35 km (22 mi) remaining of the race. His victory at E3 Harelbeke solidified him as a contender for the upcoming Tour of Flanders. On the last lap of the Tour of Flanders, Cancellara attacked on Oude Kwaremont and only Peter Sagan was able to match Cancellara's move. Together, the two rode to the last remaining escapee in the front of the race. Cancellara then attacked on the Paterberg hill with about 13 km (8 mi) remaining. Cancellara's attack was successful and he powered on solo into the finish and won his second Tour of Flanders.

After the Tour of Flanders, Cancellara started in the Scheldeprijs in Belgium. During the race, he crashed after 50 km (31 mi) but finished the race. The next day, Cancellara fell while riding on the Waindignies-Hamage cobbled sector of the Paris–Roubaix. Despite the crashes, many still considered Fabian Cancellara the favorite to win the Paris–Roubaix. During the Paris–Roubaix on 7 April, Cancellara was attacked multiple times by his competitors, but managed to counter all their attacks. With about 16 km (10 mi) to go, Cancellara made a move that only Sep Vanmarcke and Zdeněk Štybar could follow. Štybar was dropped after colliding with a spectator, leaving Cancellara and Vanmarcke to ride to the finish. Cancellara outsprinted Vanmarcke at the finish on the Roubaix velodome to claim his third Paris–Roubaix win. After the race, Cancellara stated that he would enter neither the Giro d'Italia or the Tour de France, but instead ride the Vuelta a España in order to prepare for the UCI Road World Championships.

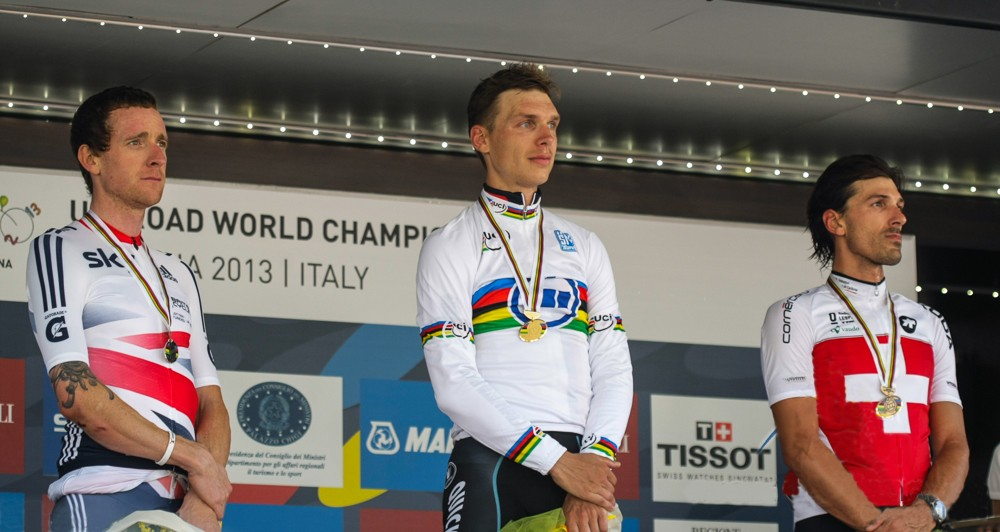
Cancellara (right) on the podium for the men's time trial at the UCI Road World Championships

On 7 June 2013 it was announced that Cancellara would ride the Tour of Austria. The next race he started was the Tour de Suisse. Cancellara placed sixteenth overall in the stage 1 individual time trial. Although he did not win a stage, Cancellara expressed his excitement for his teammate Grégory Rast's victory in the race's sixth stage. Days after finishing the Tour de Suisse, Cancellara entered and won the men's time trial event at the Swiss Road Championships for the eighth time in his career. It was announced on 1 July 2013 that Cancellara signed a three-year deal with Trek, effective on 1 January 2014 and up to and including the 2016 season.

After a short hiatus from racing, Cancellara lined up for the Tour of Austria on 30 June. He won the stage 7 individual time trial by a margin of 22 seconds over the second-place finisher, before completing the race the next day. On Friday 26 July, Cancellara attended the formal team presentation Tour de Pologne. The next day, he finished over sixteen minutes behind the stage winner in the first leg of the race. He finished second on stage seven's 37 km (23.0 mi) time trial, 56 seconds behind stage winner Bradley Wiggins. Cancellara went in hoping to win the time trial, and the second-place finish on the stage left him disappointed.

Cancellara entered the Vuelta a España and helped assist RadioShack-Leopard to a second-place finish in the race's opening team time trial. He won the stage eleven individual time trial by a margin of 37 seconds over reigning world champion Tony Martin. Cancellara then rode in support of team leader and eventual Vuelta winner Chris Horner until the seventeenth stage, after which he left the race in order to focus on the World Championships. Cancellara was seen as a contender for the gold medal in both the men's time trial and road race events at the UCI Road World Championships. Cancellara finished the time trial in third position, 48 seconds behind the winner Tony Martin, earning a bronze medal. Four days after completing the time trial event, Cancellara entered the Elite Men's road race. For most of the race, Cancellara stayed near the front of race, before being dropped however on the final climb of the day and fighting his way to tenth place. In late December, RadioShack-Leopard's general manager Luca Guercilena announced that Fabian Cancellara would attempt to break the hour record during the 2014 season.

=== 2014: Third Tour of Flanders victory ===
Fabian Cancellara began the 2014 cycling season by competing in the inaugural Dubai Tour. The first stage of the race was a brief individual time trial which Cancellara managed to complete 25 seconds slower than the stage winner Taylor Phinney. Cancellara managed to hold his fifth place overall to the race's finish that ended in front of the Burj Khalifa in Dubai. Next, Cancellara began the Tour of Qatar, where his highest stage finish, fourth place, came during the race's third stage, an individual time trial. He finished the race in 67th overall in the general classification. On 18 February, Cancellara started the Tour of Oman. Five days later, he completed the race in thirty-first place overall. Cancellara then entered the Strade Bianche, where he finished in sixth place behind winner Michał Kwiatkowski. On 12 March he started the Tirreno–Adriatico. Cancellara had one top ten result with his second-place finish in the stage seven individual time trial.

Next on the calendar for Cancellara was the Milan–San Remo which took place on 23 March. The one-day race came down to a bunch sprint after 294 kilometres (182.7 mi) of racing. Norwegian Alexander Kristoff won the bunch sprint and the race, while Cancellara finished in second position. Five days later, he competed in the E3 Harelbeke where he finished in ninth place after being caught up behind a crash and having to change a tire. Two days later, he started the Gent–Wevelgem. Cancellara came to the race a favorite, but his goal of winning the race were erased when it came down to a field sprint, where he finished in thirty-eighth position.

A week after the Gent–Wevelgem, Cancellara raced the Tour of Flanders. On the penultimate climb of the day, the Oude Kwaremont, Cancellara attacked and only Sep Vanmarcke was able to mark his move. The pair traveled along the course and caught the leaders on the road and the group of four then rode into the finish together. Cancellara out-sprinted the three other riders to win his third edition of the Tour of Flanders. Three days later, Cancellara raced in the Scheldeprijs. Four days following the Scheldeprijs, Cancellara began the Paris–Roubaix. He made a move in the Carrefour de l'Arbre sector and which led to the formation of a lead group. The group came to the line twenty seconds after the winner, with Cancellara managing to sprint to a third-place finish.

In September, Cancellara announced he would not compete in the World Championship Time Trial event, concentrating his energy for the road race which profile he said suited him. He withdrew from the Vuelta a España before Stage 18 to better prepare for this race.

=== 2015: Crashes and injuries ===
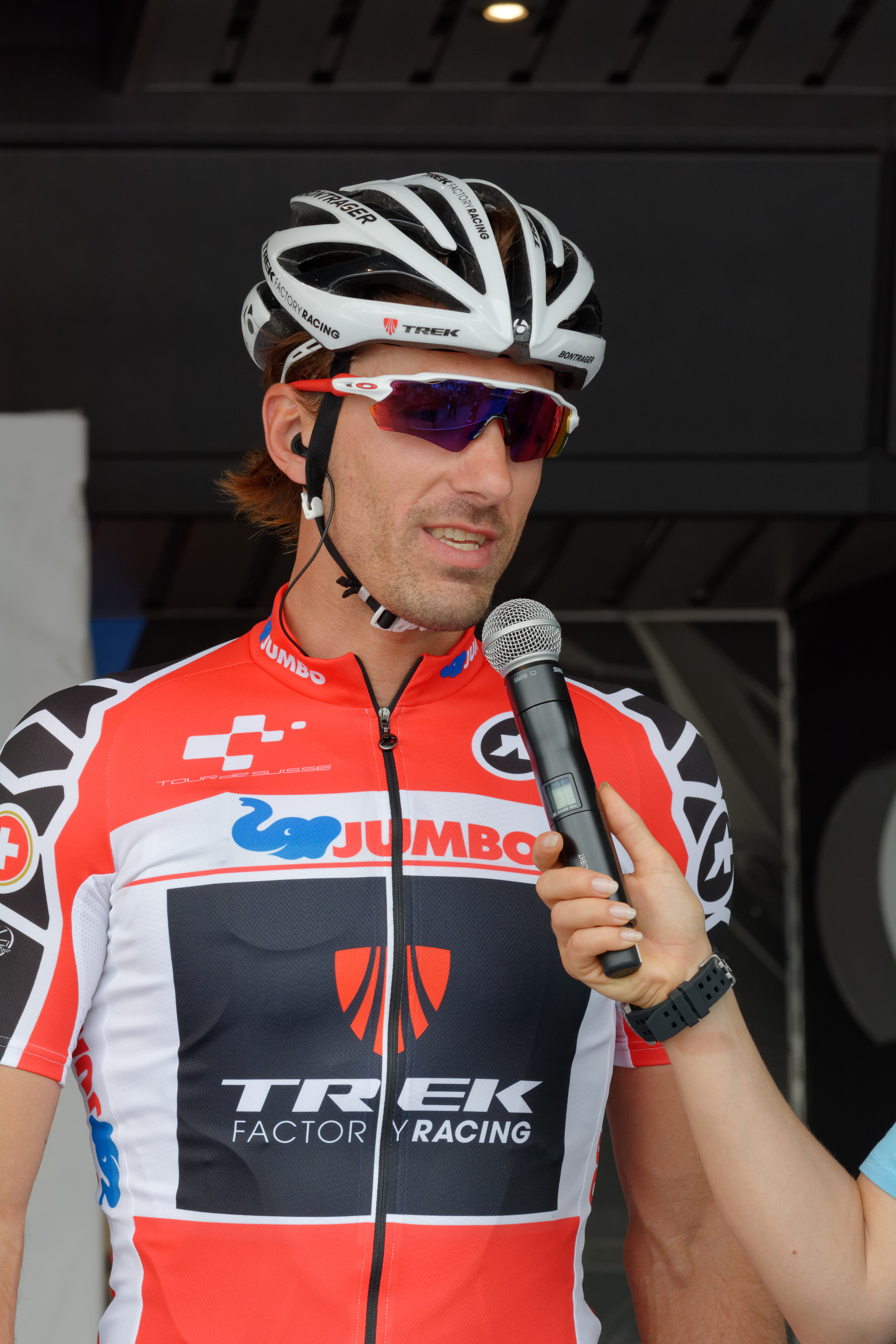
Cancellara at the 2015 Tour de Suisse

Cancellara's 2015 campaign started strong with a victory on Stage 2 of the Tour of Oman. He outsprinted a leading ten-man group to take the honours. In the Italian race Tirreno–Adriatico, he had a good prologue, taking second place behind Adriano Malori by a single second. He went on to win the final 10 km time trial of the race. In Milan–San Remo, Cancellara was in the leading group, sprinting to seventh place. The following week, Cancellara crashed badly in E3 Harelbeke, suffering two minor fractures in the transverse processes of his lower vertebrae. His injuries prevented him from defending his Tour of Flanders title, thereby ending his spring classics campaign. He came back at the Tour des Fjords in late May without registering a significant result. On home soil at the Tour de Suisse, he was second in the opening prologue and third in the final individual time trial, both times behind new time trial star Tom Dumoulin.

In the Tour de France, Cancellara came in third of stage one's individual time trial. On the second stage, he was donned the yellow jersey thanks to a third place, which gave him four bonus seconds. He was involved in a mass pile-up on the third stage, and finished the race slowly. After a visit to the hospital, it was revealed that he had suffered two transverse process fractures in two vertebrae in his lower back and he had to abandon.

He restarted competition at the Vuelta a España, aiming to regain his form for the world championships. A lingering stomach ailment forced him to abandon the race on stage 3, ruling him out of competition for the world championships in Richmond. On 11 November 2015, having suffered a season rife with serious injuries and illness, Cancellara announced that he would retire at the end of the 2016 season.

=== 2016: Final season ===
Entering his last season as a professional, he started with a win in the Trofeo Serra de Tramuntana, part of the Vuelta a Mallorca, in late January. Two weeks later, he won the time trial in the Volta ao Algarve, ahead of Tony Martin. In early March he claimed his third early-season win in the Strade Bianche – his third victory in the Tuscan race, earning him a sector of the race's gravel roads to be named in his honour. He won the final stage of Tirreno–Adriatico, his sixth Tirreno time trial stage win, before entering Milan–San Remo.

At the Olympic Games in Rio de Janeiro, Fabian Cancellara won his third Olympic medal, winning gold in the time trial, ahead of Tom Dumoulin and Chris Froome.

Fabian Cancellara raced his final professional road race, the Japan Cup criterium, on 22 October 2016.

== Personal life ==
Fabian Cancellara was born to southern Italian parents, who lived in Wohlen bei Bern, Switzerland. His first sport was cross-country skiing, before he adopted cycling as his main pursuit. He married his wife Stefanie in 2006, and later in the same year he became a father after Stefanie gave birth to a baby girl, whom they named Giuliana. Their second daughter, Elina, was born on 13 July 2012. The family now resides in Bern, Switzerland. Cancellara speaks Italian, French, English, and German fluently.

== Career achievements ==
Awards and achievements
Preceded by Roger Federer; Stan Wawrinka	Swiss Sportsman of the Year; 2008; 2016	Succeeded by Didier Cuche; Roger Federer
