= Daniele Ratto =

Italian cyclist

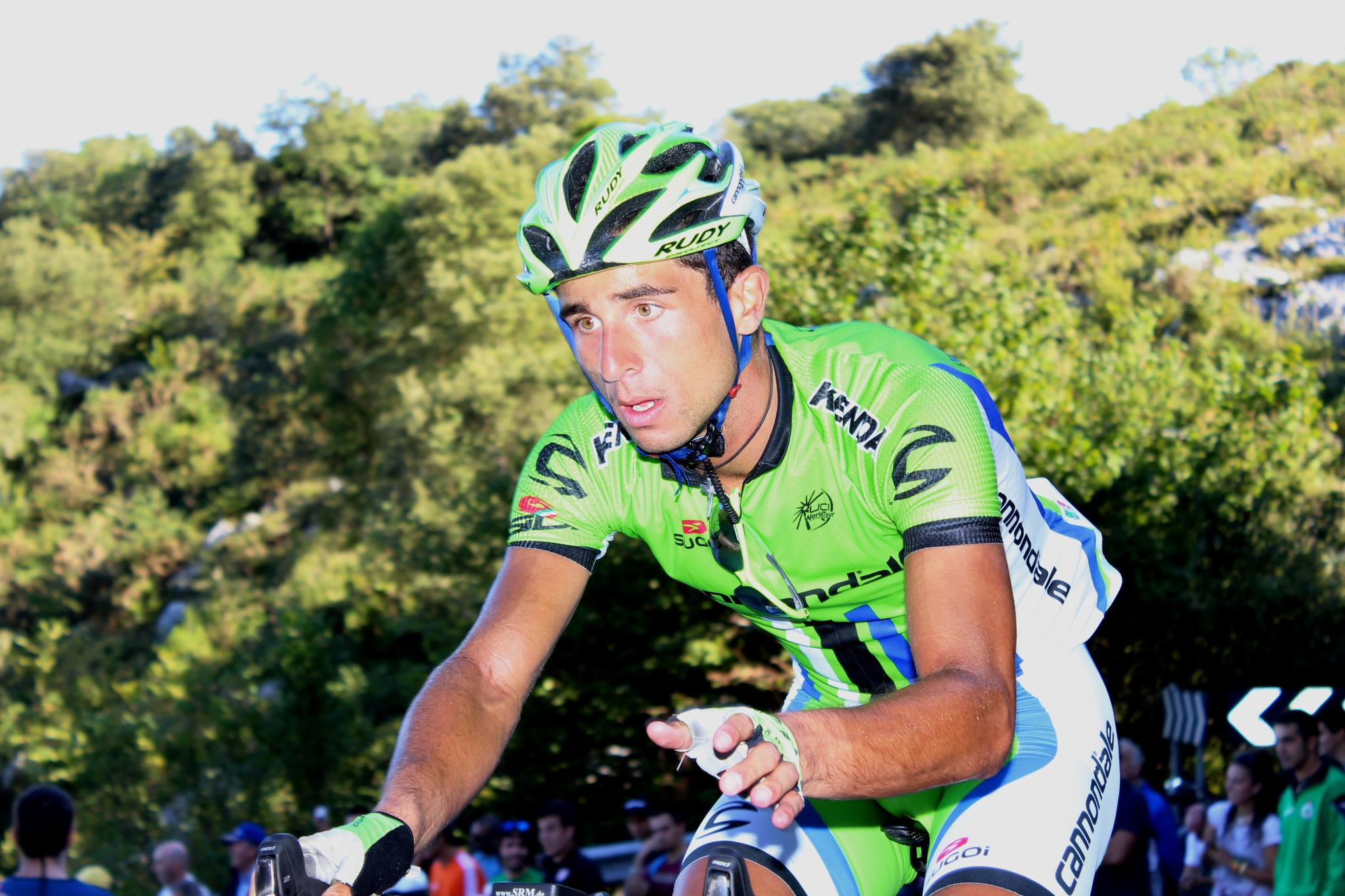
- Ratto at the 2013 Vuelta a España

Personal information
- Full name: Daniele Ratto
- Born: 5 October 1989 (age 37) Moncalieri, Italy
- Height: 1.80 m (5 ft 11 in)
- Weight: 68 kg (150 lb)

Cycling career
- Sport: Cycling
- Discipline: Road
- Role: Rider
- Rider type: All-rounder

Professional teams
- 2010: Carmiooro NGC
- 2011: Geox–TMC
- 2012–2014: Liquigas–Cannondale
- 2015: UnitedHealthcare
- 2016: Androni Giocattoli–Sidermec

Major wins
- Grand Tours Vuelta a España 1 individual stage (2013)

Daniele Ratto (born 5 October 1989) is an Italian former professional road bicycle racer, who rode professionally between 2010 and 2016 for the Carmiooro NGC, Geox–TMC, Cannondale, UnitedHealthcare, and Androni Giocattoli–Sidermec teams.

== Personal life ==
Ratto was born in Moncalieri; his sister, Rossella Ratto, also competed professionally.

== Major results ==
2006
1st Overall Giro della Lunigiana (juniors)

1st Stage 1

1st Overall Tour du Pays de Vaud (juniors)

1st Stages 2a & 3

2nd Trofeo Buffoni (juniors)
2007
2nd Road race, UCI Juniors World Championships
2nd Overall Giro della Lunigiana (juniors)

1st Stage 1

2nd Trofeo Emilio Paganessi (juniors)
3rd Road race, National Junior Road Championships
2008
1st Piccolo Giro di Lombardia
4th Overall Giro della Valle d'Aosta
4th GP Inda – Trofeo Aras Frattini
10th Paris–Tours Espoirs
2009
3rd Gran Premio Palio del Recioto
4th Firenze–Viareggio
6th Overall Giro della Valle d'Aosta
6th Cronoscalata Gardone Valtrompia
7th Gran Premio della Liberazione
2010
1st GP Industria & Artigianato di Larciano
6th Gran Premio Nobili Rubinetterie – Coppa Città di Stresa
7th Coppa Bernocchi
2011
2nd Gran Premio de Llodio
4th Trofeo Melinda
5th Vuelta a La Rioja
7th Coppa Ugo Agostoni
8th Giro di Toscana
10th Gran Premio dell'Insubria-Lugano
2012
6th Circuito de Getxo
8th Overall Tour of Slovenia
9th Rund um den Finanzplatz Eschborn-Frankfurt
2013
Vuelta a España

1st Stage 14
Held on Stage 15

9th GP Miguel Induráin
10th Gran Premio della Costa Etruschi
2015
3rd Classica Corsica
2016
3rd Overall Vuelta a la Comunidad de Madrid
4th Overall Tour of Bihor
6th Paris–Camembert
9th Giro dell'Appennino
