= Torredelcampo =

Torredelcampo, Spain (Countryside Tower)
- city
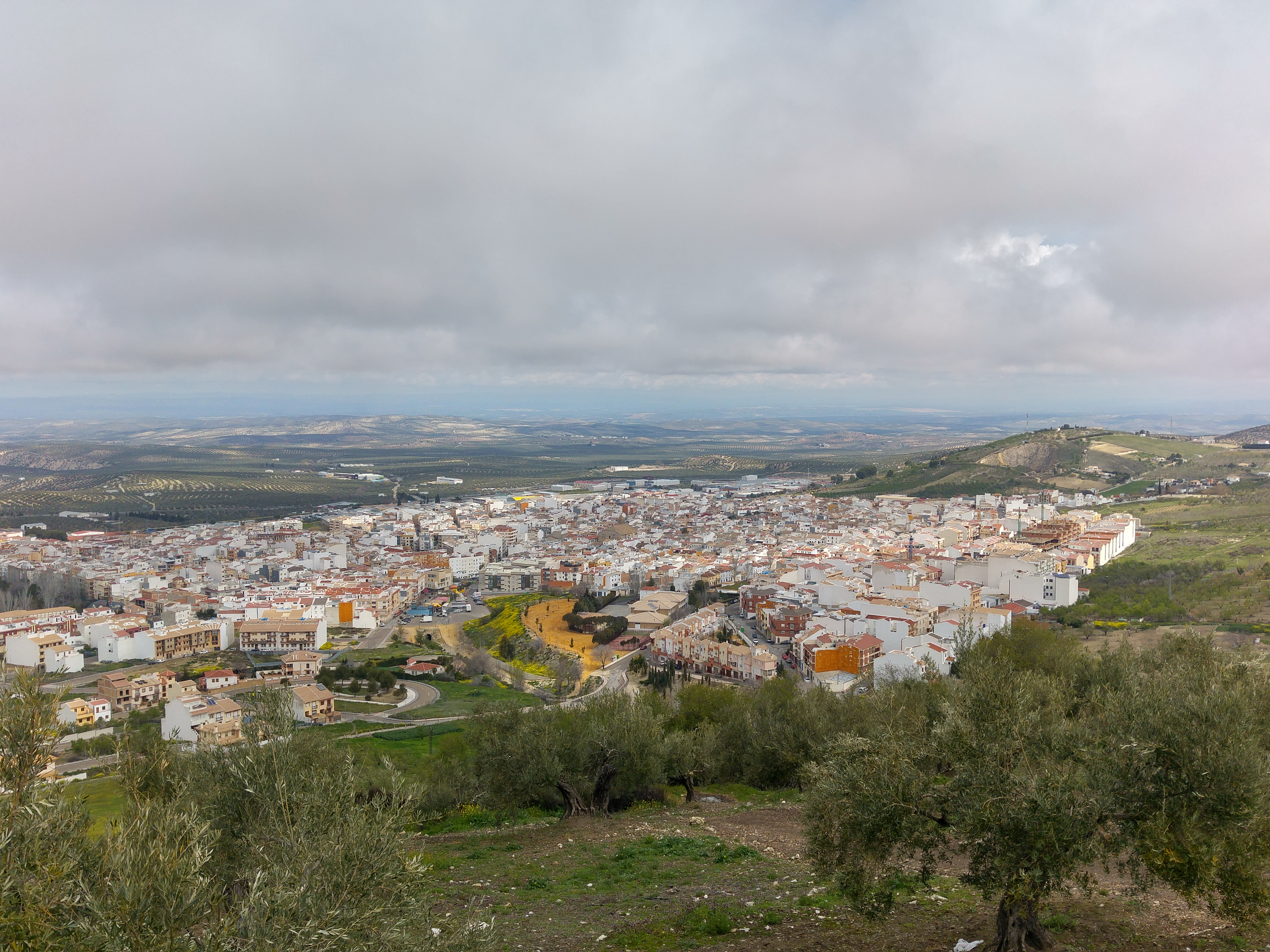

- Flag Coat of arms
- Interactive map of Torredelcampo, Spain (Countryside Tower)
- Coordinates: 37°46′N 3°53′W
- Country: Spain
- Province: Jaén
- Municipality: Torredelcampo

Area
  - Total: 182 km^{2} (70 sq mi)
- Elevation: 640 m (2,100 ft)

Population (2025-01-01)
  - Total: 13,888
  - Density: 76.3/km^{2} (198/sq mi)
- Time zone: UTC+1 (CET)
  - Summer (DST): UTC+2 (CEST)

Torredelcampo is a city located in the province of Jaén, Spain. The village is located 11 km northwest of Jaén, bordering the highway A-316, at 640 meters above sea level. According to the 2006 census (INE), the city has a population of 14,076 inhabitants.

== See also ==
- List of municipalities in Jaén
