= 2011 Omega Pharma–Lotto season =

2011 Omega Pharma–Lotto season
| Manager | Marc Sergeant |
| One-day victories | 9 |
| Stage race overall victories | 2 |
| Stage race stage victories | 17 |
Previous season • Next season

The 2011 season for Omega Pharma–Lotto began in January with the Tour Down Under, where defending champion André Greipel debuted for the team, and ended in October at the Giro di Lombardia. As a UCI ProTeam, they were automatically invited and obligated to send a squad to every event in the UCI World Tour. The team's roster changed drastically from 2010.

The team had 28 victories in 2011, which by itself is an impressive total as it tied them with Team RadioShack and Team Sky for third-most among the major teams, behind only HTC–Highroad and Liquigas–Cannondale. But the caliber of the bulk of those victories set team Omega Pharma-Lotto apart. Team leader Philippe Gilbert won four races in ten days in April, including all three Ardennes classics, as well as five other races that counted toward the UCI World Tour rankings (and a further nine that did not), marking this as a truly dominant year for the Belgian. He handily won the individual World Tour crown, with his points total more than that of over half the teams in the standings. Thanks mostly to Gilbert, Omega Pharma-Lotto also won the World Tour team award. Greipel also proved a reasonably prolific winner, winning eight races on the season, three of which counted toward the World Tour rankings.

The other major story for the team in 2011 was the rift of its two title sponsors. Omega Pharma, through their various product names, and the Belgian national lottery had sponsored the team since 2005, but it was announced relatively early in the 2011 season that they would not remain together after 2011, having different visions for the continuation of the team. Both remain as cycling sponsors, with Omega Pharma moving on to the newly branded Omega Pharma–Quick-Step in 2012 and the Belgian lottery adding Ridley to this formation, to be known as Lotto–Belisol, for 2012.

== 2011 roster ==
Ages as of January 1, 2011.

| Rider | Date of birth |
|---|---|
| Mario Aerts (BEL) | December 31, 1974 (aged 36) |
| Jan Bakelants (BEL) | February 14, 1986 (aged 24) |
| Adam Blythe (GBR) | October 1, 1989 (aged 21) |
| David Boucher (FRA) | March 17, 1980 (aged 30) |
| Bart De Clercq (BEL) | August 26, 1986 (aged 24) |
| Francis De Greef (BEL) | February 2, 1985 (aged 25) |
| Jens Debusschere (BEL) | August 28, 1989 (aged 21) |
| Kenny Dehaes (BEL) | November 10, 1984 (aged 26) |
| Gert Dockx (BEL) | July 4, 1988 (aged 22) |
| Philippe Gilbert (BEL) | July 5, 1982 (aged 28) |
| André Greipel (GER) | July 16, 1982 (aged 28) |
| Adam Hansen (AUS) | May 11, 1981 (aged 29) |
| Olivier Kaisen (BEL) | April 30, 1983 (aged 27) |
| Sebastian Lang (GER) | September 15, 1979 (aged 31) |

| Rider | Date of birth |
|---|---|
| Matthew Lloyd (Note: Lloyd was released by the team on April 14.) (AUS) | May 24, 1983 (aged 27) |
| Klaas Lodewyck (BEL) | March 24, 1988 (aged 22) |
| Maarten Neyens (BEL) | May 24, 1983 (aged 27) |
| Óscar Pujol (ESP) | March 1, 1985 (aged 25) |
| Vicente Reynés (ESP) | July 31, 1981 (aged 29) |
| Jürgen Roelandts (BEL) | July 2, 1985 (aged 25) |
| Marcel Sieberg (GER) | April 30, 1982 (aged 28) |
| Jurgen Van de Walle (BEL) | February 9, 1977 (aged 33) |
| Jurgen Van den Broeck (BEL) | February 1, 1983 (aged 27) |
| Sven Vandousselaere (BEL) | August 29, 1988 (aged 22) |
| Jelle Vanendert (BEL) | February 19, 1985 (aged 25) |
| Jussi Veikkanen (FIN) | March 29, 1981 (aged 29) |
| Frederik Willems (BEL) | September 8, 1979 (aged 31) |

Riders who joined the team for the 2011 season

| Rider | 2010 team |
|---|---|
| David Boucher | Landbouwkrediet |
| Bart De Clercq | neo-pro |
| Jens Debusschere | neo-pro |
| Gert Dockx | Team HTC–Columbia |
| André Greipel | Team HTC–Columbia |
| Adam Hansen | Team HTC–Columbia |
| Klaas Lodewyck | Topsport Vlaanderen–Mercator |
| Maarten Neyens | Topsport Vlaanderen–Mercator |
| Óscar Pujol | Cervélo TestTeam |
| Vicente Reynés | Team HTC–Columbia |
| Marcel Sieberg | Team HTC–Columbia |
| Jurgen Van de Walle | Quick-Step |
| Sven Vandousselaere | Jong Vlaanderen |
| Jussi Veikkanen | FDJ |
| Frederik Willems | Liquigas–Doimo |

Riders who left the team during or after the 2010 season

| Rider | 2011 team |
|---|---|
| Christophe Brandt | Retired |
| Wilfried Cretskens | Donckers Koffie–Jelly Belly |
| Glenn D'Hollander | Retired |
| Mickaël Delage | FDJ |
| Michiel Elijzen | Retired to become a sporting director for the team |
| Leif Hoste | Team Katusha |
| Jonas Ljungblad | Continental Team Differdange |
| Gerben Löwik | Retired |
| Daniel Moreno | Team Katusha |
| Jean-Christophe Péraud | Ag2r–La Mondiale |
| Staf Scheirlinckx | Veranda's Willems–Accent |
| Tom Stubbe | Donckers Koffie–Jelly Belly |
| Greg Van Avermaet | BMC Racing Team |
| Jurgen Van Goolen | Veranda's Willems–Accent |
| Charly Wegelius | UnitedHealthcare |

== One-day races ==
=== Spring classics ===
In March, Gilbert won Montepaschi Strade Bianche by performing a very late-race attack, a tactic that has earned him most of his professional victories. While Gilbert's attacks, when successful, usually get him away alone, this time he had to deal with Alessandro Ballan and Damiano Cunego, who were able to follow. The three decided the race a few bike lengths ahead of the rest of the 20-strong leading group, with Gilbert coming across the line ahead of Ballan and then Cunego. At the first monument race of the season, Milan – San Remo, Gilbert was considered a strong favorite victory, largely due to his win on the Strade Bianche. Greipel also rode, as the team's "Plan B" for victory, but after his injurious crash in the Tirreno–Adriatico, he was not thought to be on the best form. Omega Pharma-Lotto was one of two teams, along with BMC Racing Team, left with more than three riders present in the leading group on the road after a crash on the Le Manie climb 90 km (56 mi) from the finish split the field into two large groups. Roelandts and Greipel both took pulls on the front of the leading group, indicating that Greipel was not on sufficient form to ride for the win himself. Little by little, the leading group that had once been 44 dwindled to only eight, a select group that formed on the Poggio just a few kilometers from the finish. Gilbert tried twice to attack and solo his way to victory, once on the Poggio and once again on the finishing straight in San Remo, but he was chased down by Filippo Pozzato. While he had a gap for a brief moment in the final few meters in San Remo, both Fabian Cancellara and race winner Matthew Goss were able to pass him, leaving Gilbert third. After the race, Gilbert criticized Pozzato for chasing him down, and said that with Goss in the leading group it would have been nearly impossible for him to win.

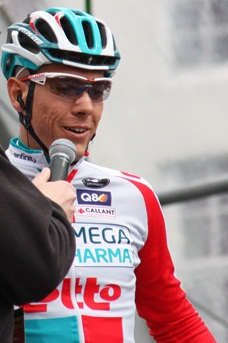
Philippe Gilbert won all three Ardennes classics in 2011, only the second time that one rider has ever won all three in the same year.

In April, Gilbert had one of the most dominant two-week periods any rider ever has. First, he took the win at Brabantse Pijl, a race seen as a precursor to the Ardennes classics. He and compatriot Björn Leukemans attacked out of what had been a leading group of ten, and stayed clear to the finish where Gilbert won the sprint. Next was the Amstel Gold Race, the first of the Ardennes classics. Gilbert came in as the defending champion, and a strong favorite. He rode a tactically sound race, staying at the front through the many selections over the 31 recognized climbs in the race. After Andy Schleck launched an attack for victory on the Keutenberg, 12 km (7.5 mi) from the finish, Gilbert and Team Katusha's Joaquim Rodríguez were among the group that overtook him on the Cauberg, the final climb. Gilbert's final finishing kick got him clear of Rodríguez by two seconds, earning him the race win for the second year in a row. Team Sky's Simon Gerrans was third. One post-race analysis opined that Gilbert's race demonstrated that he is the best rider in the world on a short uphill finish. Gilbert was the first rider since Rolf Järmann in 1998 to be a repeat winner of the Amstel, and the first since Jan Raas in 1980 to win consecutive editions. The second Ardennes classic was La Flèche Wallonne. Gilbert was mentioned among the contenders, but the Mur de Huy climb at the finish being steeper than anything covered by the Amstel, pre-race analysis viewed Rodríguez, Alberto Contador, and Robert Gesink, among others, as bigger favorites. Saxo Bank–SunGard and Leopard Trek did the bulk of the work in the peloton chasing down the morning escape, which took an advantage that ballooned to 17 minutes at one point. Gilbert later explained that Omega Pharma-Lotto did not contribute much work because their domestiques were spent from work done at Brabantse Pijl and Amstel Gold, and that La Flèche Wallonne, while still a goal for Gilbert, was not as important to him as Liège–Bastogne–Liège. The early escape was indeed caught, and a flurry of attacks and counter-attacks followed. For a while, a group of ten riders held a sustained advantage of less than a minute over the main field. Omega Pharma-Lotto was forced to work at this point, since they had no rider in that leading group. The last breakaway group was of two riders, and while they had a 14-second gap over the rest of the field going into the final kilometer, the third and final ascent of the Mur de Huy made sure that the pre-race favorites figured into the finale. Michael Albasini and Christophe Le Mével tried to solo up the Mur to victory, but they effectively led out Rodríguez and Gilbert. Gilbert again surged past Rodríguez for victory, with Samuel Sánchez rounding out the podium this time.

Liège–Bastogne–Liège was always Gilbert's biggest goal of the spring season, and victories in the first two Ardennes classics, as well as the Brabantse Pijl to precede them, left Gilbert even more anxious for victory. Liège–Bastogne–Liège, nicknamed La Doyenne (French for "the oldest", as it is the oldest continuously run cycling event in the world), is also the fourth monument race of the season. Gilbert was the clear favorite for the race – one analyst referred to it as the "Omega Pharma-Lotto rider versus the peloton." On race day, a group of 13 riders distinguished themselves as the leaders on the road for much of the day. Omega Pharma-Lotto was forced to do most of the work in the main field. Between the Col du Maquisard and the Côte de la Redoute, where the race has often been decided in the past, they stopped pulling at the front of the peloton. The time gap to the leaders briefly increased, before Leopard Trek and Gilbert's former team FDJ sent men to the front. On the next climb, the Côte de Roche aux Faucons, the widely expected attack from Leopard Trek's two leaders, the Schleck brothers, took place. Gilbert marked them, and effectively stayed in their slipstreams as the trio surged to the front of the race, past the remnants of the morning breakaway. Later, Gilbert himself took pulls. Andy Schleck took more pulls than his brother Fränk as the race wore on. At one point, on the Côte de Saint-Nicolas, Gilbert slipped away with only the elder Schleck able to follow. Andy later bridged back. At the finish, which took place on a slight downhill, neither Luxembourger put in any sort of challenge to Gilbert, and his superior sprint got him to the line first ahead of Fränk Schleck in second by a few bike lengths. The win made Gilbert just the second rider in history to win all three Ardennes classics in the same year, after Davide Rebellin in 2004. Factoring in the Brabantse Pijl made him the first rider ever to win all four of those races, which took place over a span of only 11 days, in the same year.

Gilbert's great successes in the Ardennes bore out in the UCI rankings. While the Brabantse Pijl did not contribute points toward the rankings, the other three races did. Gilbert had been 16th prior to the Amstel Gold Race, but took over fifth with his win there. His points also helped his home nation of Belgium take the lead in that classification, and the Omega Pharma-Lotto team moved up four slots as well. Rankings were not published after La Flèche Wallonne, but after Liège–Bastogne–Liège, Gilbert had moved up to world number one, by 120 points over Fabian Cancellara, with Belgium further increasing their lead in the nations classification. Omega Pharma-Lotto moved up another five places, to third.

The team also sent squads to the Trofeo Inca, Trofeo Deià, the Clásica de Almería, Le Samyn, Nokere Koerse, the Handzame Classic, Dwars door Vlaanderen, the Scheldeprijs, Paris–Roubaix, the Eschborn–Frankfurt City Loop, ProRace Berlin, Ruddervoorde Koerse and Halle–Ingooigem, but placed no higher than 13th in any of these races.

=== Fall races ===
The team also sent squads to the Grand Prix José Dubois, the GP Ouest-France, Paris–Brussels, the Grand Prix d'Isbergues, Binche–Tournai–Binche, Paris–Tours, the Nationale Sluitingsprijs, and the Giro del Piemonte, but finished no higher than 13th in any of these races.

== Stage races ==
New acquisition Greipel entered 2011 coming off a prolific 2010 season for Team HTC–Columbia, which included early season successes at the Tour Down Under. The team hoped for more of the same from Greipel in 2011, though he did not win any stage, finishing second twice, and was only seventh overall. Thus, he felt pressure to perform at his next event, the Volta ao Algarve. Gilbert was also named to the squad for this event, to try to win stages that may be too selective for Greipel. As it turned out, both riders indeed took wins in the Portuguese tour. Gilbert won the first stage with his signature late race attack. He finished five seconds clear of the peloton, led home by Gerald Ciolek and then Greipel. Gilbert later stated that his attack was the team's plan all along, and they did not want this stage, though flat, to end in a field sprint. Three stages later, Greipel won a traditional mass sprint. At Tirreno–Adriatico in March, Gilbert won a stage in a manner somewhat different from his usual style. He and three other attackers coming clear of the second group on the road bridged up to the two leaders, who had been out front all day. While Vacansoleil–DCM's Wout Poels took first position with 200 m (660 ft) to go, he did not take the optimal line to the finish. Gilbert rode against the guardrails while Poels took to the middle of the road, and claimed victory just ahead of the Dutchman. Greipel won the flat first stage of the Three Days of De Panne, but he did so by foiling a field sprint. He joined a counter-attack just as the day's morning escape was caught and easily bested his three breakaway mates at the finish line, though the peloton had come so close to catching them there was no appreciable time gap at the finish. In April, Blythe won the youth classification of the two-day Ronde van Drenthe. Both stages had sprint finishes, though the second was much more selective than the first, with only 11 riders tied on the same time. Blythe finished at the front of the race both days, and had better combined stage finishes than Jetse Bol and Barry Markus from the Rabobank continental team, winning him the award. Greipel got another stage win from a breakaway at the Presidential Cycling Tour of Turkey. He joined 11 others in the morning breakaway on stage 6. They were joined midway through the stage by 15 other riders, including three who had made a breakaway that won 12 minutes the previous day and were therefore very invested in keeping this break stay away. Greipel was easily the strongest sprinter in the group, and took a comfortable victory. At the Tour de Picardie, Dehaes won the points jersey and finished second overall behind Vacansoleil–DCM's Romain Feillu.

The team also won lesser classifications at the Vuelta a Andalucía, the Tour of Belgium, and the Ster ZLM Toer. The team also sent squads to the Tour Down Under, Driedaagse van West-Vlaanderen, Paris–Nice, Volta a Catalunya, the Tour of the Basque Country, the Tour de Romandie, the Tour de Suisse, the Tour de Wallonie, the Tour de Pologne, the Tour de Wallonie-Picarde, the Tour of Beijing and the Herald Sun Tour, but did not achieve a stage win, classification win, or podium finish in any of them.

== Season victories ==
| Date | Race | Competition | Rider | Country | Location |
|---|---|---|---|---|---|
| February 16 | Volta ao Algarve, Stage 1 | UCI Europe Tour | Philippe Gilbert (BEL) | Portugal | Albufeira |
| February 19 | Volta ao Algarve, Stage 4 | UCI Europe Tour | André Greipel (GER) | Portugal | Tavira |
| February 24 | Vuelta a Andalucía, Combination classification | UCI Europe Tour | Jurgen Van Den Broeck (BEL) | Spain | |
| February 24 | Vuelta a Andalucía, Sprints classification | UCI Europe Tour | Jan Bakelants (BEL) | Spain | |
| March 5 | Montepaschi Strade Bianche | UCI Europe Tour | Philippe Gilbert (BEL) | Italy | Siena |
| March 13 | Tirreno–Adriatico, Stage 5 | UCI World Tour | Philippe Gilbert (BEL) | Italy | Castelraimondo |
| March 29 | Three Days of De Panne, Stage 1 | UCI Europe Tour | André Greipel (GER) | Belgium | Zottegem |
| April 13 | Brabantse Pijl | UCI Europe Tour | Philippe Gilbert (BEL) | Belgium | Overijse |
| April 16 | Ronde van Drenthe, Youth classification | UCI Europe Tour | Adam Blythe (GBR) | Netherlands | |
| April 17 | Amstel Gold Race | UCI World Tour | Philippe Gilbert (BEL) | Netherlands | Cauberg |
| April 20 | La Flèche Wallonne | UCI World Tour | Philippe Gilbert (BEL) | Belgium | Huy |
| April 24 | Liège–Bastogne–Liège | UCI World Tour | Philippe Gilbert (BEL) | Belgium | Ans |
| April 29 | Tour of Turkey, Stage 6 | UCI Europe Tour | André Greipel (GER) | Turkey | Finike |
| May 13 | Giro d'Italia, Stage 7 | UCI World Tour | Bart De Clercq (BEL) | Italy | Montevergine |
| May 15 | Tour de Picardie, Points classification | UCI Europe Tour | Kenny Dehaes (BEL) | France | |
| May 26 | Tour of Belgium, Stage 2 | UCI Europe Tour | André Greipel (GER) | Belgium | Knokke-Heist |
| May 28 | Tour of Belgium, Stage 4 | UCI Europe Tour | Philippe Gilbert (BEL) | Belgium | Eupen |
| May 29 | Tour of Belgium, Stage 5 | UCI Europe Tour | André Greipel (GER) | Belgium | Putte |
| May 29 | Tour of Belgium, Overall | UCI Europe Tour | Philippe Gilbert (BEL) | Belgium | |
| May 29 | Tour of Belgium, Points classification | UCI Europe Tour | André Greipel (GER) | Belgium | |
| May 29 | Giro d'Italia, TV classification | UCI World Tour | Jan Bakelants (BEL) | Italy | |
| May 31 | Gullegem Koerse | National event | Philippe Gilbert (BEL) | Belgium | Gullegem |
| June 6 | Critérium du Dauphiné, Stage 1 | UCI World Tour | Jurgen Van Den Broeck (BEL) | France | Saint-Pierre-de-Chartreuse |
| June 18 | Ster ZLM Toer, Stage 4 | UCI Europe Tour | Philippe Gilbert (BEL) | Belgium | La Gileppe |
| June 19 | Ster ZLM Toer, Overall | UCI Europe Tour | Philippe Gilbert (BEL) | Netherlands | |
| June 19 | Ster ZLM Toer, Sprint classification | UCI Europe Tour | Philippe Gilbert (BEL) | Netherlands | |
| July 2 | Tour de France, Stage 1 | UCI World Tour | Philippe Gilbert (BEL) | France | Mont des Alouettes |
| July 12 | Tour de France, Stage 10 | UCI World Tour | André Greipel (GER) | France | Carmaux |
| July 16 | Tour de France, Stage 14 | UCI World Tour | Jelle Vanendert (BEL) | France | Plateau de Beille |
| July 30 | Clásica de San Sebastián | UCI World Tour | Philippe Gilbert (BEL) | Spain | San Sebastián |
| August 9 | Eneco Tour, Stage 1 | UCI World Tour | André Greipel (GER) | Netherlands | Sint Willebrord |
| August 10 | Eneco Tour, Stage 2 | UCI World Tour | André Greipel (GER) | Belgium | Ardooie |
| August 11 | Eneco Tour, Stage 3 | UCI World Tour | Philippe Gilbert (BEL) | Belgium | Andenne |
| September 9 | Grand Prix Cycliste de Québec | UCI World Tour | Philippe Gilbert (BEL) | Canada | Quebec City |
| September 14 | Grand Prix de Wallonie | UCI Europe Tour | Philippe Gilbert (BEL) | Belgium | Namur |
| October 15 | UCI World Tour | UCI World Tour | Philippe Gilbert (BEL) | | |
| October 15 | UCI World Tour, Teams classification | UCI World Tour | (Note: This award is calculated by adding the points earned by a team's top five riders in the individual standings. Those five riders were Philippe Gilbert, André Greipel, Jurgen Van den Broeck, Jürgen Roelandts, and Jelle Vanendert) | | |
