= 2018 Milan–San Remo =

Cycling race

2018 UCI World Tour, race 8 of 37
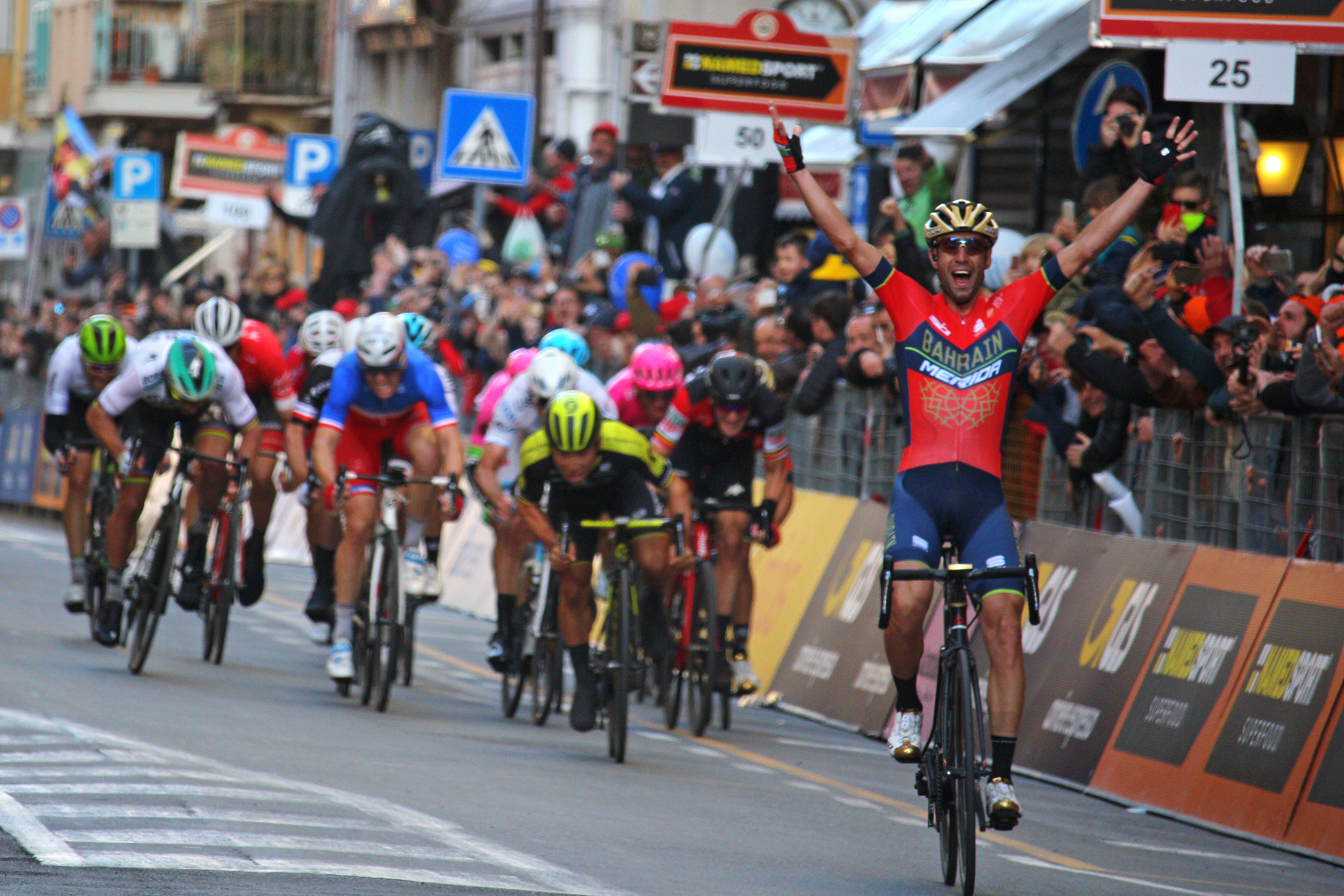
- Vincenzo Nibali winning the race

Race details
- Dates: 17 March 2018
- Stages: 1
- Distance: 294 km (183 mi)
- Winning time: 7h 18' 43"

Results
	Winner	Vincenzo Nibali (ITA)	(Bahrain–Merida)
	Second	Caleb Ewan (AUS)	(Mitchelton–Scott)
	Third	Arnaud Démare (FRA)	(Groupama–FDJ)

The 2018 Milan–San Remo (known as Milano-Sanremo presented by NAMEDSPORT> for sponsorship reasons) was a road cycling one-day race that took place on 17 March 2018 in Italy. It was the 109th edition of the Milan–San Remo and the eighth event of the 2018 UCI World Tour.

The race was won by Vincenzo Nibali from the Bahrain–Merida team, becoming the first Italian rider since Filippo Pozzato in 2006 to win La Classicissima. Nibali had attacked on the Poggio di San Remo, and managed to hold off the sprinters in the closing stages to seal victory. Caleb Ewan (Mitchelton–Scott) led the sprinters home in second ahead of Groupama–FDJ's Arnaud Démare, the 2016 winner.

== Teams ==
As Milan–San Remo was a UCI World Tour event, all eighteen UCI WorldTeams were invited automatically and obliged to enter a team in the race. Seven UCI Professional Continental teams competed, completing the 25-team peloton. Each team was allowed to bring seven riders to the race, leading to a field made up of 175 riders.

UCI WorldTeams

- AG2R La Mondiale
- Astana
- Bahrain–Merida
- BMC Racing Team
- Bora–Hansgrohe
- EF Education First–Drapac p/b Cannondale
- Team Dimension Data
- Team Katusha–Alpecin
- LottoNL–Jumbo
- Lotto–Soudal
- Movistar Team
- Mitchelton–Scott
- Quick-Step Floors
- Team Sky
- Team Sunweb
- Trek–Segafredo
- UAE Team Emirates
- Groupama–FDJ

UCI Professional Continental teams

- Bardiani–CSF
- Cofidis
- Gazprom–RusVelo
- Israel Cycling Academy
- Nippo–Vini Fantini–Europa Ovini
- Team Novo Nordisk
- Wilier Triestina–Selle Italia

== Route ==
As one of the sports monuments, Milan–San Remo – generally considered to be a sprinters' classic – is among the highest-rated races in professional cycling. The 2018 route was initially scheduled to be 291 km (181 mi) long, running from the Via della Chiesa Rossa in Milan to the traditional finish on San Remo's Via Roma. The final part of the race included the climbs of the Cipressa and the Poggio, which usually prove decisive for the race outcome. Also on the route, the riders also had to tackle the 35 km (22 mi) climb of the Passo dello Turchino, although it was not considered to be a key point in the race. After the Turchino, the route followed the Aurelia road along the coast from Genoa all the way to the finish in Sanremo. With a little over 50 km (31 mi) left to go, the first of the coastal climbs started with the Capo Mele, the Capo Cervo and the Capo Berta, before meeting the final two climbs leading to the finish.

The day before the race, it was announced that the race was to be lengthened to 294 km (183 mi) with a diversion after the original 100 km (62 mi) mark, at Basaluzzo.

== Pre-race favourites ==
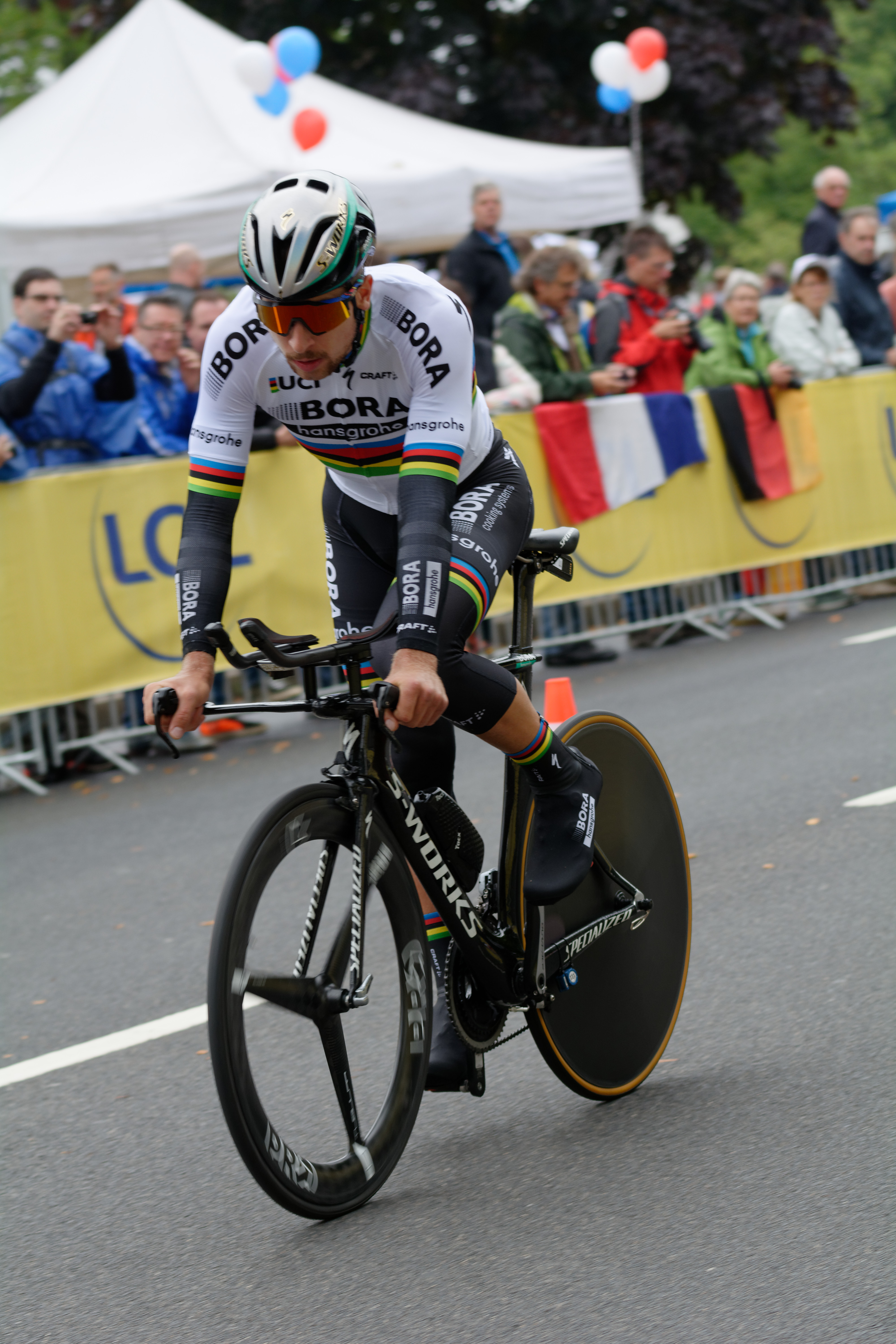
Peter Sagan (pictured at the 2017 Tour de France) was considered the main favourite for victory.

Three-time world champion Peter Sagan (Bora–Hansgrohe) was considered the highest ranked favourite for the victory. Unlike others in the field, he was considered as a rider who could win both through a bunch sprint as well as a late attack on the final climb. He came into the race with good form, having finished second on three stages of Tirreno–Adriatico, a stage race held before Milan–San Remo. Michał Kwiatkowski (Team Sky), the defending champion, was also considered a strong favourite, as he had won the general classification at Tirreno–Adriatico. Julian Alaphilippe (Quick-Step Floors), who was third in 2017, was also counted among the favourites for the race. While Kwiatkowski and Alaphilippe were considered to have to rely on a breakaway on one of the final climbs, several sprinters were counted among the favourites if a larger group reached the finish line together. 2014 winner Alexander Kristoff (UAE Team Emirates) was among them, as was Arnaud Démare (Groupama–FDJ), who won the race in 2016, but had to withdraw from Paris–Nice due to a cold.

Other strong sprinters at the start line were Elia Viviani (Quick-Step Floors), Matteo Trentin (Mitchelton–Scott), Edvald Boasson Hagen (Team Dimension Data), Magnus Cort (Astana), André Greipel (Lotto–Soudal) and Marcel Kittel (Team Katusha–Alpecin), who took part in the race for the first time. Michael Matthews (Team Sunweb), usually also a favourite, was not given a strong chance due to a fractured shoulder, suffered three weeks prior at Omloop Het Nieuwsblad. 2015 winner John Degenkolb (Trek–Segafredo) missed the race due to illness, as did his teammate Giacomo Nizzolo. Fernando Gaviria (Quick-Step Floors) also missed the race, because of a fractured hand suffered at Tirreno–Adriatico. His teammate Philippe Gilbert, who had finished on the podium of Milan–San Remo twice before, aimed at a victory to get closer to his goal of winning all five "monument races" of cycling. More riders considered to potentially play their hand on one of the climbs before the finish were Vincenzo Nibali (Bahrain–Merida), Olympic champion Greg Van Avermaet (BMC Racing Team), Gianni Moscon (Team Sky) and Nathan Haas (Team Katusha–Alpecin).

== Race report ==
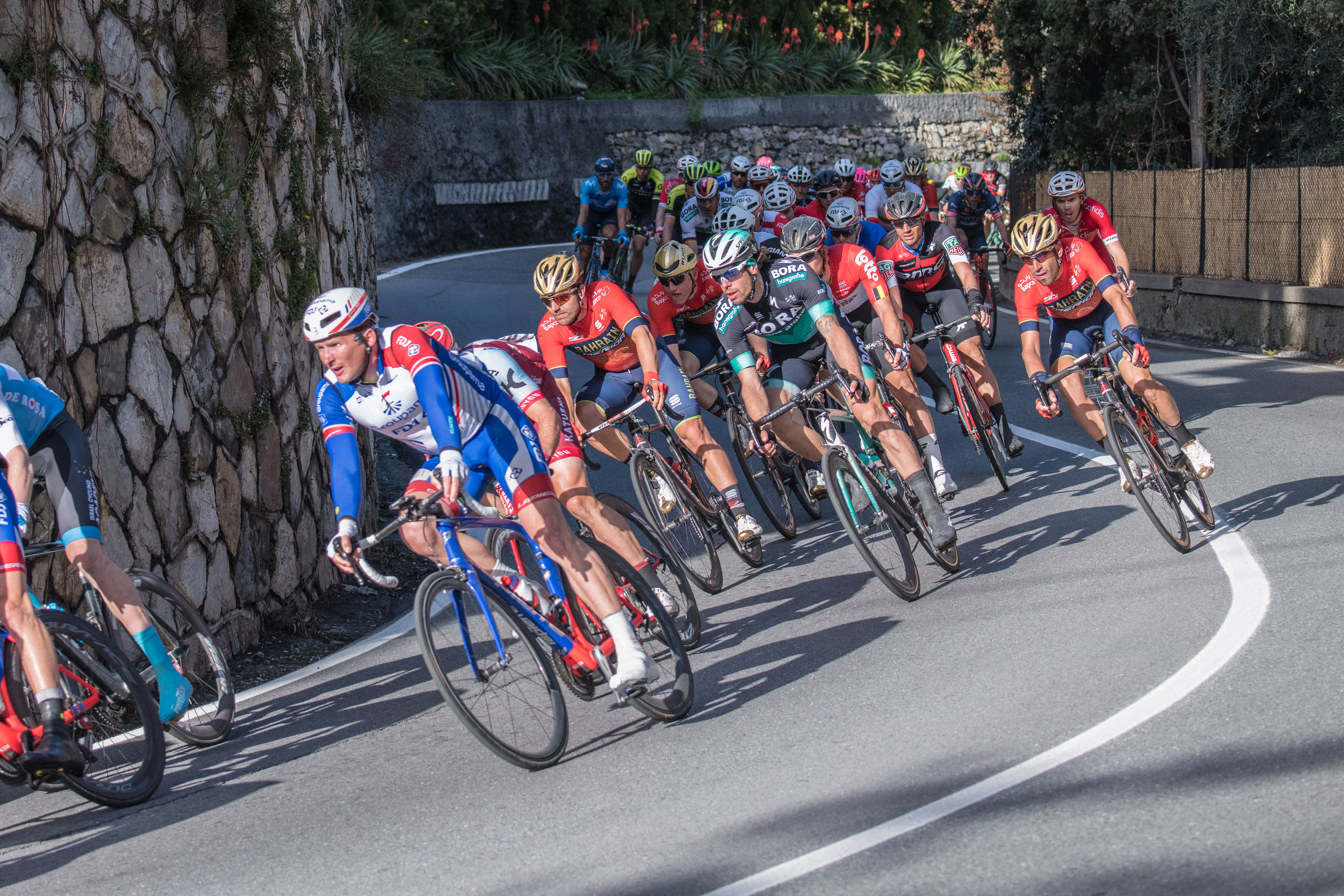
The peloton descending down the Capo Berta climb

The race started in heavy rain in Milan. The rolling start took place at 10:13 am local time at the Via della Chiesa Rossa outside of the city. An early breakaway formed, consisting of Mirco Maestri and Lorenzo Rota (both Bardiani–CSF), Evgeny Kobernyak (Gazprom–RusVelo), Guy Sagiv and Dennis van Winden (both Israel Cycling Academy), Sho Hatsuyama (Nippo–Vini Fantini–Europa Ovini), Charles Planet (Team Novo Nordisk), Matteo Bono (UAE Team Emirates) and Jacopo Mosca (Wilier Triestina–Selle Italia). The maximum time gap the group held was six minutes after about an hour of racing.

The peloton began to pull back on the Passo Turchino climb, cutting the break's lead to 4:30 minutes by the summit, though it extended back to five minutes as the riders reached the sea front. With the roads still wet, a crash in the field involved both Kristoff and Greipel among others. With 70 km (43 mi) of the race to go, the rain eased up. By the first of the so-called Capi climbs 50 km (31 mi) from the finish, the breakaway's lead was down to two minutes. At the Capo Berta, with 39 km (24 mi) left, the lead had decreased further to half a minute, while the high tempo in the field distanced Marcel Kittel. Maestri attacked from the break on the descent, taking Rota, van Winden, and Bono with him. However, they were caught at San Lorenzo al Mare, 30 km (19 mi) before the finish.

As the field reached the climb of the Cipressa, more riders failed to keep contact with the field's high pace. However, no major attacks were launched. At the base of the Poggio climb, Astana and Groupama–FDJ set the tempo. Mark Cavendish (Team Dimension Data) had to retire after a spectacular accident in which he hit a traffic bollard and crashed onto the road. Marcus Burghardt (Bora–Hansgrohe) led the first acceleration on the climb, with Jempy Drucker (BMC Racing Team) following. Drucker moved past Burghardt but was reeled back by the Bahrain–Merida squad. Krists Neilands (Israel Cycling Academy) attacked shortly before the summit and Vincenzo Nibali reacted, leaving Neilands shortly thereafter and heading towards the finish on his own. His lead at the summit was 12 seconds. Matteo Trentin (Quick-Step Floors) tried to counter the attack on the descent, but was unable to do so. At the bottom of the descent, Nibali's lead was nine seconds over a larger group of riders. Alaphilippe set the pace as they tried to reach Nibali before the line, but to no avail. Nibali won the race just ahead of Caleb Ewan and Arnaud Démare, who led out the sprint from the group behind. It was Nibali's third victory in one of cycling's "monument" races, having won Il Lombardia twice before. He was also the first Italian to win the race since Filippo Pozzato in 2006.

== Post-race ==
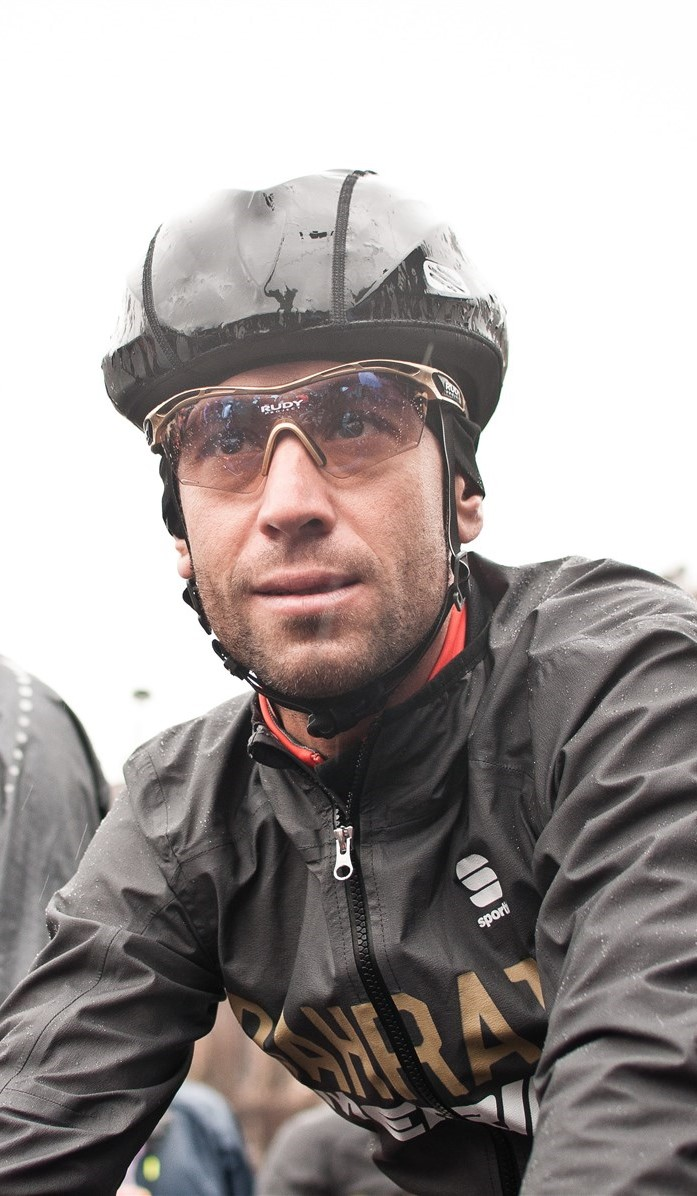
Vincenzo Nibali (pictured at the start) won the race for Bahrain–Merida.

Following his victory, Nibali thanked his Bahrain–Merida teammates for their efforts. He described the final kilometres of the race as "endless – pure suffering." He added: "I was very cold and calculating. I knew I was working for the team. When I attacked, I knew I had to go alone, and it was that way". Second-placed Caleb Ewan stated that he was surprised to have been so close to victory. He felt that the race had gone his way, adding: "All that went wrong for us is that Vincenzo was too strong." Sixth-placed Peter Sagan congratulated Nibali on his win, saying: "He deserves it. None of us had any means against his attack."

Mark Cavendish's crash, which left him with a broken rib, caused him to miss the 2018 Commonwealth Games. André Greipel, who suffered two crashes in the last 4 km (2.5 mi) of the race, was forced to miss the rest of the spring classics season due to a broken collarbone.

== Result ==
Result
Rank	Rider	Team	Time
1	Vincenzo Nibali (ITA)	Bahrain–Merida	7h 18' 43"
2	Caleb Ewan (AUS)	Mitchelton–Scott	+ 0"
3	Arnaud Démare (FRA)	Groupama–FDJ	+ 0"
4	Alexander Kristoff (NOR)	UAE Team Emirates	+ 0"
5	Jürgen Roelandts (BEL)	BMC Racing Team	+ 0"
6	Peter Sagan (SVK)	Bora–Hansgrohe	+ 0"
7	Michael Matthews (AUS)	Team Sunweb	+ 0"
8	Magnus Cort (DEN)	Astana	+ 0"
9	Sonny Colbrelli (ITA)	Bahrain–Merida	+ 0"
10	Jasper Stuyven (BEL)	Trek–Segafredo	+ 0"

Results show only the top-ten finishers.
