= 2012 Ster ZLM Toer =

2012 UCI Europe Tour

Race details
- Dates: 14–17 June 2012
- Stages: 4
- Distance: 670.5 km (416.6 mi)
- Winning time: 16h 11' 55"

Results
Jersey awarded to the overall winner	Winner	Mark Cavendish (GBR)	(Team Sky)
	Second	Lars Boom (NED)	(Rabobank)
	Third	Jürgen Roelandts (BEL)	(Lotto–Belisol)
Jersey awarded to the points classification winner	Points	Marcel Kittel (GER)	(Argos–Shimano)
Jersey awarded to the mountains classification winner	Mountains	Nelson Oliveira (POR)	(RadioShack–Nissan)
Jersey awarded to the sprints classification winner	Sprints	Dries Hollanders (BEL)	(Metec Continental Cycling Team)
	Team	(Belgium) Topsport Vlaanderen–Mercator	

The 2012 Ster ZLM Toer cycling race was the 17th running of the Ster ZLM Toer. It was part of the 2012 UCI Europe Tour and classed as a 2.1 event. The race was won by Mark Cavendish of Team Sky, marking his first general classification win.

== Schedule ==
Stage	Route	Distance	Type	Date	Winner
1	Eindhoven to Sittard-Geleen	151 km (93.8 mi)	Flat stage	14 June	Marcel Kittel (GER)
2	Nuth(Schimmert) to Nuth(Schimmert)	167 km (103.8 mi)	Flat stage	15 June	André Greipel (GER)
3	Hotel Verviers to Lake Gileppe	189 km (117.4 mi)	Flat stage	16 June	Lars Boom (NED)
4	Schijndel to Boxtel	163.5 km (101.6 mi)	Flat stage	17 June	Marcel Kittel (GER)

== Teams ==
- Lotto–Belisol
- Garmin–Barracuda
- Omega Pharma–Quick-Step
- Rabobank
- RadioShack–Nissan
- Team Saxo Bank
- Team Sky
- Vacansoleil–DCM
- Team Katusha
- Landbouwkrediet–Euphony
- Topsport Vlaanderen–Mercator
- Argos–Shimano
- Team NetApp
- RusVelo
- Accent.jobs–Willems Veranda's
- Cycling Team De Rijke
- Cycling Team Jo Piels
- Koga Cycling Team
- Metec Continental Cycling Team

== Stages ==
Key:
: Leader and eventual winner of General Classification.
: Leader and eventual winner of points classification.
: Leader and eventual winner of intermediate sprints classification.
: Leader and eventual winner of mountains' classification.

=== Stage 1 ===
14 June 2012 – Eindhoven to Sittard-Geleen, 151 km (94 mi)

Stage 1 Result
	Rider	Team	Time
1	Marcel Kittel (GER)	Argos–Shimano	3h 30' 05"
2	Mark Renshaw (AUS)	Rabobank	s.t.
3	Mark Cavendish (GBR)	Team Sky	s.t.
4	Kenny van Hummel (NED)	Vacansoleil–DCM	s.t.
5	Giacomo Nizzolo (ITA)	RadioShack–Nissan	s.t.
6	André Greipel (GER)	Lotto–Belisol	s.t.
7	Kevin Peeters (BEL)	Landbouwkrediet–Euphony	s.t.
8	Takashi Miyazawa (JPN)	Team Saxo Bank	s.t.
9	Jempy Drücker (LUX)	Accent.jobs–Willems Veranda's	s.t.
10	Stefan van Dijk (NED)	Accent.jobs–Willems Veranda's	s.t.

General Classification after Stage 1
	Rider	Team	Time
1	Marcel Kittel (GER)	Argos–Shimano	3h 29' 55"
2	Mark Renshaw (AUS)	Rabobank	+ 4"
3	Rens te Stroet (NED)	Cycling Team Jo Piels	+ 4"
4	Mark Cavendish (GBR)	Team Sky	+ 6"
5	Sven Vandousselaere (BEL)	Topsport Vlaanderen–Mercator	+ 6"
6	Jeffrey Wiersma (NED)	Metec Continental Cycling Team	+ 8"
7	Kenny van Hummel (NED)	Vacansoleil–DCM	+ 10"
8	Giacomo Nizzolo (ITA)	RadioShack–Nissan	+ 10"
9	André Greipel (GER)	Lotto–Belisol	+ 10"
10	Kevin Peeters (BEL)	Landbouwkrediet–Euphony	+ 10"

=== Stage 2 ===
15 June 2012 – Nuth(Schimmert) to Nuth(Schimmert), 167 km (104 mi)

Stage 2 Result
	Rider	Team	Time
1	André Greipel (GER)	Lotto–Belisol	4h 13' 26"
2	Mark Cavendish (GBR)	Team Sky	s.t.
3	Mark Renshaw (AUS)	Rabobank	s.t.
4	Gregory Henderson (NZL)	Lotto–Belisol	+ 2"
5	Kenny Van Hummel (NED)	Vacansoleil–DCM	+2"
6	Marcel Kittel (GER)	Argos–Shimano	+2"
7	Alexey Tsatevitch (RUS)	Team Katusha	+2"
8	Giacomo Nizzolo (ITA)	RadioShack–Nissan	+2"
9	Sven Vandousselaere (BEL)	Topsport Vlaanderen–Mercator	+2"
10	Juan Antonio Flecha (ESP)	Team Sky	+2"

General Classification after Stage 2
	Rider	Team	Time
1	Mark Cavendish (GBR)	Team Sky	7h 43' 21"
2	Mark Renshaw (AUS)	Rabobank	s.t.
3	André Greipel (GER)	Lotto–Belisol	s.t.
4	Marcel Kittel (GER)	Argos–Shimano	+ 2"
5	Sven Vandousselaere (BEL)	Topsport Vlaanderen–Mercator	+ 8"
6	Kenny van Hummel (NED)	Vacansoleil–DCM	+ 12"
7	Giacomo Nizzolo (ITA)	RadioShack–Nissan	+ 12"
8	Gregory Henderson (NZL)	Lotto–Belisol	+ 12"
9	Raymond Kreder (NED)	Garmin–Barracuda	+ 12"
10	Michael Van Staeyen (NED)	Topsport Vlaanderen–Mercator	+ 12"

=== Stage 3 ===
16 June 2012 – Hotel Verviers to Lake Gileppe, 189 km (117 mi)

Stage 3 Result
	Rider	Team	Time
1	Lars Boom (NED)	Rabobank	4h 52' 46"
2	Mark Cavendish (GBR)	Team Sky	s.t.
3	Juan Antonio Flecha (ESP)	Team Sky	s.t.
4	Koen de Kort (NED)	Argos–Shimano	s.t.
5	Giacomo Nizzolo (ITA)	RadioShack–Nissan	s.t.
6	Maxime Vantomme (BEL)	Team Katusha	s.t.
7	Dennis van Winden (NED)	Rabobank	s.t.
8	Jürgen Roelandts (BEL)	Lotto–Belisol	s.t.
9	Lars Bak (DEN)	Lotto–Belisol	s.t.
10	Laurens De Vreese (BEL)	Topsport Vlaanderen–Mercator	s.t.

General Classification after Stage 3
	Rider	Team	Time
1	Mark Cavendish (GBR)	Team Sky	12h 36' 01"
2	Lars Boom (NED)	Rabobank	+ 8"
3	Juan Antonio Flecha (ESP)	Team Sky	+ 14"
4	Giacomo Nizzolo (ITA)	RadioShack–Nissan	+ 18"
5	Sven Vandousselaere (BEL)	Topsport Vlaanderen–Mercator	+ 18"
6	Nikolai Trussov (RUS)	RusVelo	+ 18"
7	Lars Bak (DEN)	Lotto–Belisol	+ 18"
8	Jürgen Roelandts (BEL)	Lotto–Belisol	+ 18"
9	Koen de Kort (NED)	Argos–Shimano	+ 18"
10	Dennis van Winden (NED)	Rabobank	+ 18"

=== Stage 4 ===
17 June 2012 – Schijndel to Boxtel, 163.5 km (101.6 mi)

Stage 4 Result
	Rider	Team	Time
1	Marcel Kittel (GER)	Argos–Shimano	3h 35' 54"
2	Mark Renshaw (AUS)	Rabobank	s.t.
3	Jürgen Roelandts (BEL)	Lotto–Belisol	s.t.
4	Raymond Kreder (NED)	Garmin–Barracuda	s.t.
5	Alexander Porsev (RUS)	Team Katusha	s.t.
6	Kenny van Hummel (NED)	Vacansoleil–DCM	s.t.
7	Michael Van Staeyen (BEL)	Topsport Vlaanderen–Mercator	s.t.
8	Rüdiger Selig (GER)	Team Katusha	s.t.
9	Jempy Drücker (LUX)	Accent.jobs–Willems Veranda's	s.t.
10	Lars Boom (NED)	Rabobank	s.t.

Final General Classification
	Rider	Team	Time
1	Mark Cavendish (GBR)	Team Sky	16h 11' 55"
2	Lars Boom (NED)	Rabobank	+ 8"
3	Jürgen Roelandts (BEL)	Lotto–Belisol	+ 14"
4	Juan Antonio Flecha (ESP)	Team Sky	+ 14"
5	Giacomo Nizzolo (ITA)	RadioShack–Nissan	+ 18"
6	Nikolai Trussov (RUS)	RusVelo	+ 18"
7	Koen de Kort (NED)	Argos–Shimano	+ 18"
8	Maxime Vantomme (BEL)	Team Katusha	+ 18"
9	Sven Vandousselaere (BEL)	Topsport Vlaanderen–Mercator	+ 18"
10	Lars Bak (DEN)	Lotto–Belisol	+ 18"

== Classification leadership ==
Stage	Winner	General classification	Points classification	Mountains classification	Sprints classification	Team classification
1	Marcel Kittel	Marcel Kittel	Marcel Kittel	Sven Vandousselaere	Rens te Stroet	Landbouwkrediet–Euphony
2	André Greipel	Mark Cavendish	Mark Cavendish	Bart van Haaren	Rens te Stroet	Lotto–Belisol
3	Lars Boom	Mark Cavendish	Mark Cavendish	Nelson Oliveira	Rens te Stroet	Lotto–Belisol
4	Marcel Kittel	Mark Cavendish	Marcel Kittel	Nelson Oliveira	Dries Hollanders	Topsport Vlaanderen–Mercator
Final		Mark Cavendish	Marcel Kittel	Nelson Oliveira	Dries Hollanders	Topsport Vlaanderen–Mercator

== Final standings ==
General classification
	Rider	Team	Time
1	Mark Cavendish (GBR)	Team Sky	16h 11' 55"
2	Lars Boom (NED)	Rabobank	+ 8"
3	Jürgen Roelandts (BEL)	Lotto–Belisol	+ 14"
4	Juan Antonio Flecha (ESP)	Team Sky	+ 14"
5	Giacomo Nizzolo (ITA)	RadioShack–Nissan	+ 18"
6	Nikolai Trussov (RUS)	RusVelo	+ 18"
7	Koen de Kort (NED)	Argos–Shimano	+ 18"
8	Maxime Vantomme (BEL)	Team Katusha	+ 18"
9	Sven Vandousselaere (BEL)	Topsport Vlaanderen–Mercator	+ 18"
10	Lars Bak (DEN)	Lotto–Belisol	+ 18"

Points classification
	Rider	Team	Points
1	Marcel Kittel (GER)	Argos–Shimano	35
2	Mark Cavendish (GBR)	Team Sky	34
3	Mark Renshaw (AUS)	Rabobank	34
4	André Greipel (GER)	Lotto–Belisol	20
5	Kenny van Hummel (NED)	Vacansoleil–DCM	19
6	Lars Boom (NED)	Rabobank	16
7	Giacomo Nizzolo (ITA)	RadioShack–Nissan	15
8	Jürgen Roelandts (BEL)	Lotto–Belisol	13
9	Juan Antonio Flecha (ESP)	Team Sky	11
10	Greg Henderson (NZL)	Lotto–Belisol	8

Mountains classification
	Rider	Team	Points
1	Nelson Oliveira (POR)	RadioShack–Nissan	12
2	Bart van Haaren (NED)	Koga Cycling Team	12
3	Ben Hermans (BEL)	RadioShack–Nissan	10
4	Jan Bakelants (BEL)	RadioShack–Nissan	10
5	Dion Bakelants (NED)	Cycling Team De Rijke	10
6	Jarosław Marycz (POL)	Team Saxo Bank	10
7	Marco Haller (AUT)	Team Katusha	8
8	Nathan Haas (AUS)	Garmin–Barracuda	8
9	Sven Vandousselaere (BEL)	Topsport Vlaanderen–Mercator	3
10	Jim van den Berg (NED)	Koga Cycling Team	3

Sprints classification
	Rider	Team	Time
1	Dries Hollanders (BEL)	Metec Continental Cycling Team	6
2	Rens te Stroet (NED)	Cycling Team Jo Piels	6
3	Jarosław Marycz (POL)	Team Saxo Bank	4
4	Sven Vandousselaere (BEL)	Topsport Vlaanderen–Mercator	4
5	Pim Ligthart (NED)	Vacansoleil–DCM	3
6	Nathan Haas (AUS)	Garmin–Barracuda	3
7	Dion Bakelants (NED)	Cycling Team De Rijke	3
8	Iljo Keisse (BEL)	Omega Pharma–Quick-Step	3
9	Jim van den Berg (NED)	Koga Cycling Team	3
10	Nikolas Maes (BEL)	Omega Pharma–Quick-Step	2

Team classification
Pos.	Team	Time
1	Topsport Vlaanderen–Mercator	48h 36' 38"
2	Lotto–Belisol	+ 3"
3	Team Katusha	+ 26"
4	Team Sky	+ 39"
5	Vacansoleil–DCM	+ 42"
6	RadioShack–Nissan	+ 1' 27"
7	Rabobank	+ 1' 44"
8	RusVelo	+ 2' 06"
9	Omega Pharma–Quick-Step	+ 5' 12"
10	Cycling Team De Rijke	+ 5' 16"
