= 2010 Omega Pharma–Lotto season =

2010 Omega Pharma–Lotto season
Manager	Marc Sergeant
One-day victories	4
Stage race overall victories	1
Stage race stage victories	6
Previous season • Next season

The 2010 season for Omega Pharma–Lotto began in January with the Tour Down Under and ended in October at the Chrono des Nations. As a UCI ProTour team, they were automatically invited and obliged to send a squad to every event in the ProTour.

== 2010 roster ==
Ages as of January 1, 2010.

Rider	Date of birth
Mario Aerts (BEL)	December 31, 1974 (aged 35)
Jan Bakelants (BEL)	February 14, 1986 (aged 23)
Adam Blythe (GBR)	October 1, 1989 (aged 20)
Christophe Brandt (BEL)	May 6, 1977 (aged 32)
Wilfried Cretskens (BEL)	July 10, 1976 (aged 33)
Francis De Greef (BEL)	February 2, 1985 (aged 24)
Kenny Dehaes (BEL)	November 10, 1984 (aged 25)
Mickaël Delage (FRA)	August 6, 1985 (aged 24)
Glenn D'Hollander (BEL)	December 28, 1974 (aged 35)
Michiel Elijzen (NED)	August 31, 1982 (aged 27)
Philippe Gilbert (BEL)	July 5, 1982 (aged 27)
Leif Hoste (BEL)	July 17, 1977 (aged 32)
Olivier Kaisen (BEL)	April 30, 1983 (aged 26)
Ahmed Müder (TUR)	July 15, 1987 (aged 22)

Rider	Date of birth
Sebastian Lang (GER)	September 15, 1979 (aged 30)
Jonas Ljungblad (SWE)	January 15, 1979 (aged 30)
Matthew Lloyd (AUS)	May 29, 1983 (aged 26)
Gerben Löwik (NED)	June 29, 1977 (aged 32)
Daniel Moreno (ESP)	September 5, 1981 (aged 28)
Jean-Christophe Péraud (FRA)	May 22, 1977 (aged 32)
Jürgen Roelandts (BEL)	July 2, 1985 (aged 24)
Staf Scheirlinckx (BEL)	March 12, 1979 (aged 30)
Tom Stubbe (BEL)	May 26, 1981 (aged 28)
Greg Van Avermaet (BEL)	May 17, 1985 (aged 24)
Jurgen Van den Broeck (BEL)	February 1, 1983 (aged 26)
Jurgen Van Goolen (BEL)	November 28, 1980 (aged 29)
Jelle Vanendert (BEL)	February 19, 1985 (aged 24)
Charly Wegelius (GBR)	April 26, 1978 (aged 31)

Riders who joined the team for the 2010 season

Rider	2009 team
Jan Bakelants	Topsport Vlaanderen–Mercator
Adam Blythe	stagiaire (Silence–Lotto)
Gerben Löwik	Vacansoleil
Daniel Moreno	Caisse d'Epargne
Jean-Christophe Péraud	Orbea
Jurgen Van Goolen	Team Saxo Bank

Riders who left the team during or after the 2009 season

Rider	2010 team
Bart Dockx	Landbouwkrediet
Cadel Evans	BMC Racing Team
Gorik Gardeyn	Vacansoleil
Pieter Jacobs	Topsport Vlaanderen–Mercator
Roy Sentjens	Team Milram
Johan Vansummeren	Garmin–Transitions

== Stage races ==
The team attended the Tour Down Under, with a squad headed by Jürgen Roelandts, who did not win any stage but did win the best young rider competition.

== Grand Tours ==
=== Giro d'Italia ===
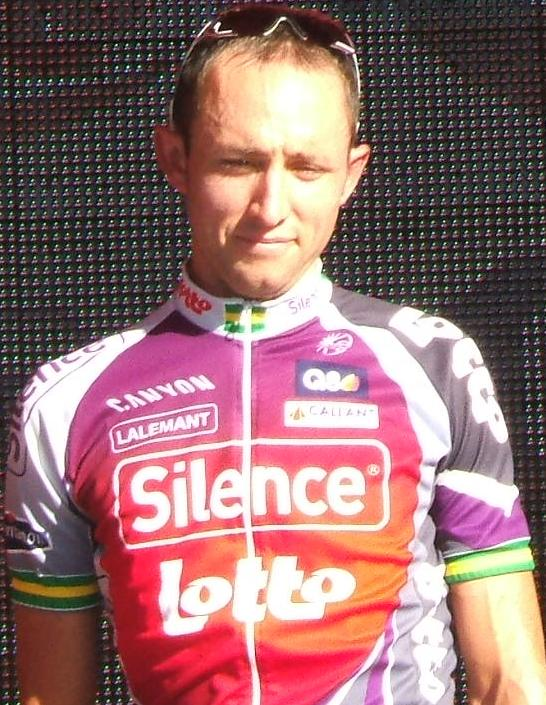
Matthew Lloyd, pictured here in the 2009 Silence–Lotto team kit, won the mountains classification in the Giro d'Italia.

Omega Pharma-Lotto came to the Giro with a young squad – Bakelandts, Blythe, and De Greef were all eligible for the youth classification, and Wegelius was the only rider older than 30 – headed by Lang. Their outside contender for the general classification was Moreno, and Elijzen was included on the squad with the time trials in mind. In stage 3 in the Netherlands, Blythe made the late selection for a depleted group sprint finish, taking fifth, one spot ahead of the season's most prolific winner André Greipel. The squad's best-placed rider prior to the transfer to Italy was Lang in 33rd. The squad rode solidly in the stage 4 team time trial, finishing with seven riders (only Elijzen and Blythe fell off the pace) in a seventh place time 46 seconds off the pace of stage winners Liquigas–Doimo.

In stage 6, Lloyd and Androni Giocattoli rider Rubens Bertogliati formed the day's principal breakaway after 45 km (28 mi). Lloyd led Bertogliati over the day's first two climbs before breaking free of him before the last. He soloed over the Bedizzano and, 11 km (6.8 mi) later, the finish line, winning the stage 1'15" ahead of the peloton. Lloyd also took the green jersey as mountains classification leader with the day's results. Lloyd made early morning breakaways in stages 8, 11, and 20 to take mountains points on climbs early in the course those days. Lloyd wore the green jersey for the rest of the Giro, winning the classification in Verona at the Giro's conclusion. Lloyd also won the combativity classification, an award determined by points given for riders' positions in stage finishes, mountain climbs, and intermediate sprints.

Lloyd's victories were the only ones the squad attained. Bakelandts finished in the top ten on the very difficult, muddy stage 7 in Tuscany and again in stage 11, when a 50-rider breakaway led to massive changes in the overall standings. Lang made a winning breakaway in stage 13, finishing fifth in the sprint for the stage win. Elijzen took eighth in the Giro's final field sprint, in stage 18. The squad finished fifth in the Trofeo Fast Team standings and 16th in the Trofeo Super Team.

=== Tour de France ===
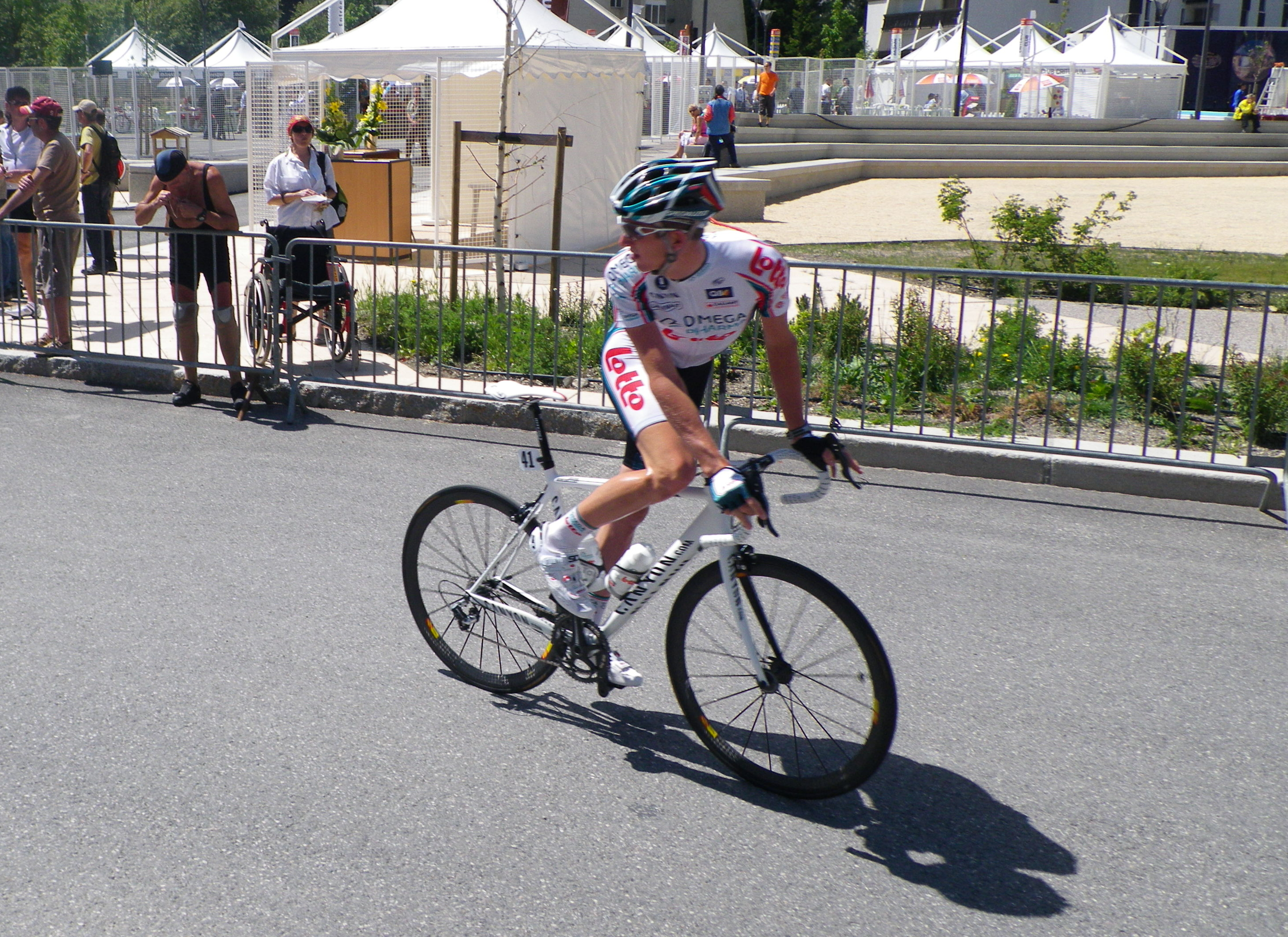
Jurgen Van den Broeck entered the Tour hoping to finish in the top ten, and completed the race in fifth place overall.

Omega Pharma-Lotto's squad leader at the Tour de France was Van Den Broeck, who hoped to finish the race in the top ten after a 15th place in the 2009 event. They rode without Gilbert, who was concentrating on the Vuelta a España later in the season, and without French national time trial champion Péraud, who was not yet recovered from injuries sustained in the Critérium du Dauphiné.

The squad did little on the first three days of the Tour, taking a couple of meaningless top placings with Roelandts on stages which both involved neutralizations. In stage 3, which covered several cobbled sectors in an area on the border between Belgium and France, Van Den Broeck finished with the second group on the road, 53 seconds behind the stage winner. This was good for ninth on the day and propelled him from 33rd overall up to tenth, as many riders who had been ahead of him, including some overall favorites, lost significant time. The overall standings did not change again until stage 7, which ended at Station des Rousses in the Jura, the first stage with any significant amount of climbing. Van Den Broeck finished with the elite riders in the race. His time gaps to his rivals were unchanged, but since Fabian Cancellara, Geraint Thomas, and Thor Hushovd, who had been ahead of him, finished well back, he moved up to seventh overall. Also on this stage, Moreno followed a move instigated by Pierrick Fédrigo in the final kilometer and finished 7 seconds ahead of the peloton, for sixth on the day. Van Den Broeck was on good form again the next day in a more mountainous stage, finishing with the elite riders again. While he was part of a nine-rider group who lost ten seconds to Andy Schleck and Samuel Sánchez, who aggressively sought the stage win, he moved up a further four places with this result, occupying fourth overall before the Tour's first rest day.

In the first stage after the rest day, Van Den Broeck lost time on the Col de la Madeleine. The race's elite riders lost between two and three minutes to Schleck and Alberto Contador, who had bridged up to the morning breakaway. Van Den Broeck ceded 40 seconds to Denis Menchov, which allowed the Russian to pass him in the overall classification. The next day, Aerts made the morning escape, but was unable to maintain the pace by eventual stage winner Sérgio Paulinho, finishing fifth on the day a minute and a half back. An otherwise flat stage 12 ended with a short but nearly vertical climb to Mende. Van Den Broeck rode with the front group most of the day, but again lost ten seconds at the finish line, this time to Contador and stage winner Joaquim Rodríguez. Van Den Broeck had trailed the race elite on the climb to Ax-3-Domaines, but when Contador and Schleck engaged in a bizarre track stand for a few moments, he caught back up and finished with them. With time losses by Levi Leipheimer, who had been in sixth place, Van Den Broeck's advantage over the next man in the standings (now Robert Gesink) was extended to nearly a minute. Van Den Broeck lost eight seconds to the race's top riders the next day, but Gesink slipped further, so his advantage was increased.

Van Den Broeck came ninth in the Tour's 17th and queen stage, which finished at the Col du Tourmalet. Most of the race's elite riders finished ahead of him, but he lost only eight seconds to Gesink and still had a solid hold on fifth overall after this stage. During the stage 19 individual time trial, a drastic change in wind direction occurred, meaning the earlier starters posted considerably better times than those who came later. Van Den Broeck started fifth-from-last as the fifth place man in the race and was 71st on this stage, over seven minutes off the winning time, but his main rival Gesink was 109th and a further 90 seconds slower. He finished the Tour in this position after its largely ceremonial final road race stage. Also in the last days of the Tour, Roelandts took two high placings in the final two road race stages, seventh in stage 18 and fourth on the Champs-Élysées to close out the race. The squad finished fifth in the teams classification. They did not win anything at the Tour, but did achieve the stated goal of a top-ten placing for Van Den Broeck.

== Season victories ==
Date	Race	Competition	Rider	Country	Location
January 24	Tour Down Under, Youth classification	UCI ProTour	Jurgen Roelandts (BEL)	Australia	
April 18	Amstel Gold Race	UCI ProTour	Philippe Gilbert (BEL)	Netherlands	Valkenburg
May 14	Giro d'Italia, Stage 6	UCI World Ranking	Matthew Lloyd (AUS)	Italy	Marina di Carrara
May 26	Tour of Belgium, Stage 1	UCI Europe Tour	Philippe Gilbert (BEL)	Belgium	Eeklo
May 30	Tour of Belgium, Sprints classification	UCI Europe Tour	Philippe Gilbert (BEL)	Belgium	
May 30	Giro d'Italia, Mountains classification	UCI World Ranking	Matthew Lloyd (AUS)	Italy	
May 30	Giro d'Italia, Combativity classification	UCI World Ranking	Matthew Lloyd (AUS)	Italy	
August 30	Vuelta a España, Stage 3	UCI World Ranking	Philippe Gilbert (BEL)	Spain	Málaga
September 17	Vuelta a España, Stage 19	UCI World Ranking	Philippe Gilbert (BEL)	Spain	Toledo
September 30	Circuit Franco-Belge, Stage 1	UCI Europe Tour	Adam Blythe (GBR)	Belgium	Mouscron
October 2	Circuit Franco-Belge, Stage 3	UCI Europe Tour	Adam Blythe (GBR)	Belgium	Ichtgem
October 3	Circuit Franco-Belge, Overall	UCI Europe Tour	Adam Blythe (GBR)	Belgium	
October 3	Circuit Franco-Belge, Sprint classification	UCI Europe Tour	Adam Blythe (GBR)	Belgium	
October 3	Circuit Franco-Belge, Youth classification	UCI Europe Tour	Adam Blythe (GBR)	Belgium	
October 12	Nationale Sluitingsprijs	UCI Europe Tour	Adam Blythe (GBR)	Belgium	Putte (Kapellen)
October 14	Giro del Piemonte	UCI Europe Tour	Philippe Gilbert (BEL)	Italy	Cherasco
October 16	Giro di Lombardia	UCI World Ranking	Philippe Gilbert (BEL)	Italy	Como
