= 2013 Omloop Het Nieuwsblad =

- Event poster with previous winner Sep Vanmarcke

Race details
- Dates: 23 February
- Stages: 1
- Distance: 198.9 km (123.6 mi)
- Winning time: 4h 52' 15"

Results
	Winner	Luca Paolini (ITA)	(Team Katusha)
	Second	Stijn Vandenbergh (BEL)	(Omega Pharma–Quick-Step)
	Third	Sven Vandousselaere (BEL)	(Topsport Vlaanderen–Baloise)

The 2013 Omloop Het Nieuwsblad took place on 23 February 2013. It was the 68th edition of the international classic Omloop Het Nieuwsblad.

Team Katusha's Luca Paolini of Italy beat Omega Pharma–Quick-Step's Stijn Vandenbergh of Belgium in a two-up sprint.

== Teams ==
Non ProTeams teams are indicated by an asterisk below. Each of the 25 teams were permitted up to eight riders, for a total of 198 riders.

- Accent Jobs–Wanty*
- Ag2r–La Mondiale
- Argos–Shimano
- Blanco Pro Cycling
- BMC Racing Team
- Bretagne–Séché Environnement*
- Champion System*
- Cofidis*
- Crelan–Euphony*
- FDJ
- Garmin–Sharp
- IAM Cycling*
- Lampre–Merida
- Lotto–Belisol
- MTN–Qhubeka*
- Omega Pharma–Quick-Step
- Orica–GreenEDGE
- Sojasun*
- Team Europcar*
- Team Katusha
- NetApp–Endura*
- Team Sky
- Topsport Vlaanderen–Baloise*
- Vacansoleil–DCM
- Vini Fantini–Selle Italia*

== Results ==
Result
Rank	Rider	Team	Time
1	Luca Paolini (ITA)	Team Katusha	4h 52' 15"
2	Stijn Vandenbergh (BEL)	Omega Pharma–Quick-Step	+ 0"
3	Sven Vandousselaere (BEL)	Topsport Vlaanderen–Baloise	+ 1' 13"
4	Geraint Thomas (GBR)	Team Sky	+ 1' 13"
5	Greg Van Avermaet (BEL)	BMC Racing Team	+ 1' 13"
6	Marco Bandiera (ITA)	IAM Cycling	+ 1' 13"
7	Sylvain Chavanel (FRA)	Omega Pharma–Quick-Step	+ 1' 13"
8	Jürgen Roelandts (BEL)	Lotto–Belisol	+ 1' 13"
9	Maarten Wynants (BEL)	Blanco Pro Cycling	+ 1' 13"
10	Egoitz García (ESP)	Cofidis	+ 1' 13"
