= Gileppe Dam =

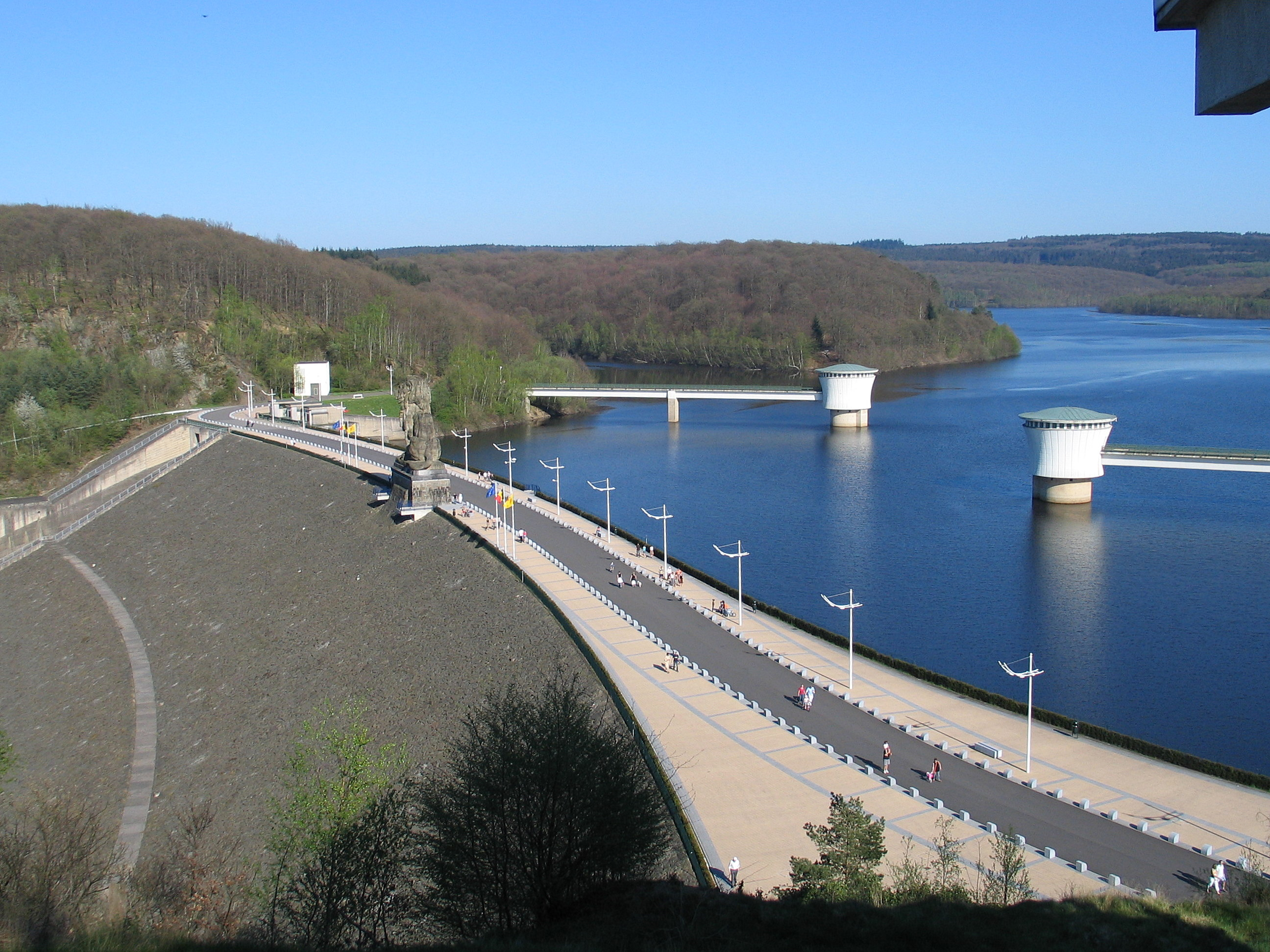
- View from above in April 2007

- Location within Belgium
- Interactive map of Gileppe Dam
- Official name: Barrage de la Gileppe (French)
- Location: Jalhay, Liège province, Wallonia, Belgium
- Coordinates: 50°35′21″N 5°58′28″E
- Construction began: 1868 (heightened 1967–71)
- Opening date: 28 July 1878
- Construction cost: 4,549,000 Belgian fr. ($874,000, £182,000)
- Owner: Wallonia
- Operator: Service public de Wallonie (SPW)

Dam and spillways
- Type of dam: Gravity dam (masonry earth- and rockfill)
- Impounds: Gileppe river
- Height: 1878: 51.76 metres Present: 68 metres
- Length: 365 meters
- Width (base): 66 metres
- Dam volume: 248480.3 m^{3}

Reservoir
- Creates: Lake Gileppe
- Total capacity: 26,400,000 m^{3}
- Surface area: 130 hectares

Power Station
- Turbines: two horizontal Francis-type
- Installed capacity: 0.633 MW
- Annual generation: 3.3 million kWh

The Gileppe Dam (French Barrage de la Gileppe) is an arch-gravity dam on the Gileppe river in Jalhay, Liège province, Wallonia, Belgium. It was built in the 1870s to supply water for the wool industry in nearby Verviers. The monumental structure with its unusually thick profile played an important role in establishing an international standard for masonry gravity dams as a technology for major water supply systems. It was considered one of the strongest dams in Europe at the time, and it was the first dam built in modern Belgium. In the first decade of the 21st century, it was noted as supplying most of the drinking water for Verviers, as well as industrial water, and as producing hydroelectricity.

== Background ==
Gileppe Dam bridge
- Coordinates: 50°35′16″N 5°58′28″E
- Carries: foot traffic; no longer open for vehicles

Characteristics
- Width: 1878: roadway 7m, footway 4m on each side

Location
- Interactive map of Gileppe Dam bridge

In the 19th century, the dam was built to ensure the water supply for Verviers, the center of the wool industry in Belgium. Wool was imported through Antwerp and washed at Verviers, situated between the Ardennes and Belgium's Carboniferous region, before it was shipped for manufacture in Germany and Austria. Wool washing was facilitated by the high acidity of the water. Originally, the industry's water source was the Vesdre river, which proved to be insufficient; moreover, water was returned to the river so polluted that it destroyed the fish population and was blamed for the spread of malaria downstream. In the summer, when water levels were at their lowest, the industry faced shortages, and the local population relied on a limited supply of drinking water from springs. A dam was proposed, with studies to be undertaken by the engineer Bidaut. The goal was to provide the river Vesdre with about 3,000,000 cubic metres of water for the year, and 14,600,704 cubic metres to industry (8,808,000 gallons a day). After delays, a design was submitted in 1868 to the Minister of Public Works.

The main function of the Gileppe Dam in the 21st century is to provide drinking water. As these needs are met, surplus water is turbinated. In 1997, the Gileppe Dam produced 3,255,525 cubic metres of drinking water. Although capacity is small, the Vesdre basin is one of the few places in Belgium to produce hydropower.

== Planning and design ==
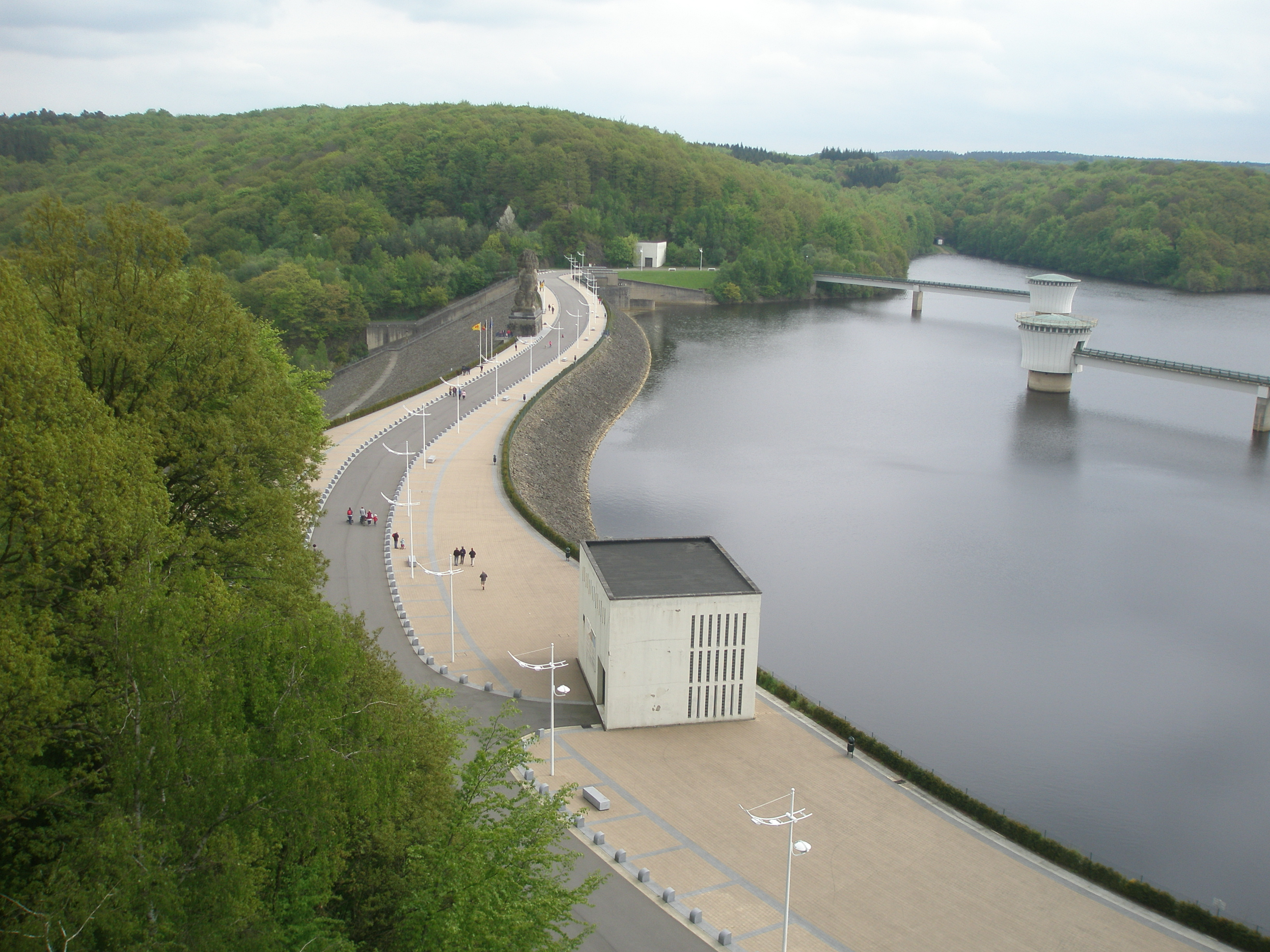
Gileppe dam, view from above 2009

The Belgian government assigned the study of the water supply to Bidaut, a chief engineer within the ministry, in September 1857. Originally the plan was to impound the upper Vesdre, in a joint project with the town of Eupen, also located within the watershed and at that time part of Prussia. These negotiations collapsed by 1864, and Bidaut turned his attention to the Gileppe, a tributary of the Vesdre entirely within the jurisdiction of the Belgian ministry. Throughout the 1860s, Bidaut undertook engineering studies for the reservoir with Donckier and Jamblinnes. Water distribution was studied by Cariez and Moulon. The site chosen for the dam is 1500 meters from the confluence of the Gileppe and Vesdre, where the valley narrows and the geological formation allowed for building the axis of the dam parallel to that of the vertical rock strata.

Bidaut was influenced in particular by dams at Alicante in Spain and Furens in France. The dam's "extremely conservative proportions" were shaped by the engineering ideas of J. Augustine DeSazilly, F. Emile Delocre, and W.J.M. Rankine. The plan was accepted in 1867. The contractors were Braive and Caillet.

== Original construction ==
Work began in 1868 and continued for ten years. The dam was built by a crew of masons numbering from 80 to 100, under the direction of eight to ten foremen.

Before the foundations were laid, two subterranean channels were dug, one on each side, through which the Gileppe river was diverted during construction. Afterward, these became conduits for cast-iron outlet pipes used to draw water from two 2.8m-diameter wells placed in the reservoir.

The foundations were sunk to a depth of 1 meter into the rock. The wall was constructed of rubble masonry in a total amount of 248480 cubic meters (325,000 cubic yards). The faces are finished with shaped blocks, between .45 and .3m thick and .6–.4m long. The ends dovetail into solid rock, cut into 1m steps. The sandstone or limestone for the wall came from area quarries located no closer than 50 meters (164 feet) from the site and at a higher elevation than the crown. Building materials were transported on two narrow-gauge railways. The grouting for the rubble blocks was compacted from four parts sand, one part trass delivered in lumps from Andernach, and five parts slaked lime from Tournai, which was known for the quality of its hydraulic lime.

It was remarked as late as 1907 that "the average yearly work of over 54,000 cubic yards has probably never been surpassed in the construction of any other single structure." The daily work per man averaged 2.6 to 3.2 cubic yards (1.98–2.44 cubic meters).

Flood waters were released through two overflow weirs, 25 meters wide (82 feet), situated 2 meters (6.58 feet) below the crown and following the slopes of the hillside.

The dam was inaugurated 28 July 1878 by King Leopold II.

== Leakage and reservoir acidity ==
Profile of the Gileppe Dam

When the reservoir was first filled, water leaked through the dam at a rate of about 5,300 gallons a day. Although the leakage slowed, four years later moisture could still be observed on the downstream face.

The profile was criticized as overengineered. An estimated 75 percent of its masonry was considered "useless," in contrast to the "scientific design" of the Furens Dam. This overbuilding was attributed to "a great timidity on the part of the Belgian engineers, who were fully impressed with the great body of water they were going to store … and the calamity the failure of the dam would cause." While recognizing that the amount of water the Gileppe dam would retain far exceeded that of its predecessors at Alicante and Furens, the engineers themselves also maintained that they were allowing for a heightening of the dam in future, should the need arise for greater storage. By the 1960s, it had been decided that the dam did indeed require an increase of height. From 1967 to 1971, it was raised by a little over 16 meters. The dam was reinaugurated 20 October 1971 under King Baudouin.

The high acidity of the reservoir water corroded the original 19th-century lead pipes and led to lead poisoning in the area. One report claims that the faculty of medicine at Verviers began to study the problem, but had to drop their research "under pressure from the industrialists." Treating the water to make it less acidic would decrease its efficiency in washing wool. The solution was to lay pipe to divert water for industrial use from a treatment plant to improve drinking quality. The plant has been operational since 1992.

== The lion ==
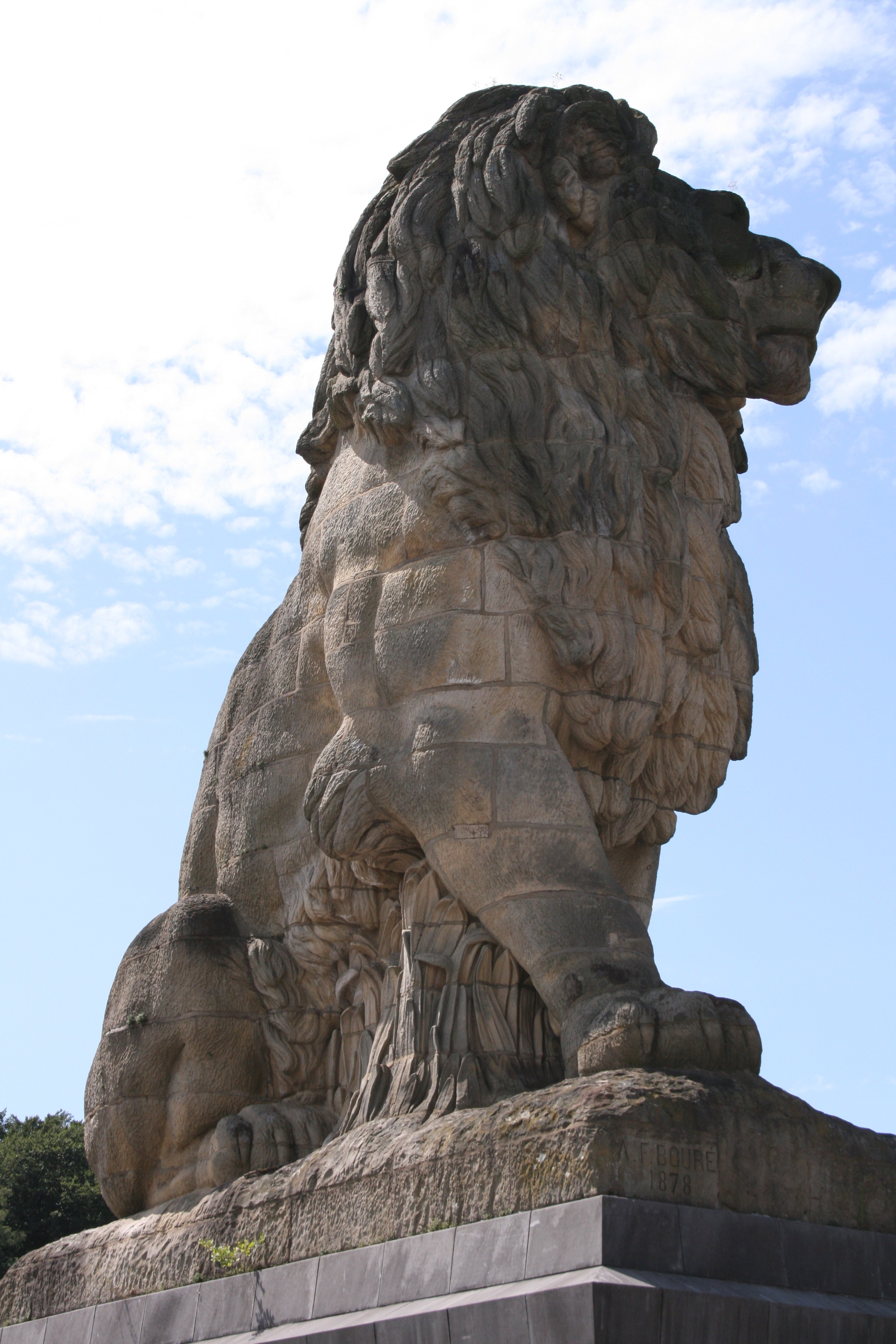
Bouré's monumental lion

The dam was topped by a monumental lion sculpture created by Belgian artist Antoine-Félix Bouré, noted for his public lions in Brussels and Charleroi. Formed of 183 blocks of sandstone from the Sûre valley in Luxembourg, it weighs 300 tonnes (nearly 661,387 pounds) and stands 13.5 meters tall (over 44 feet). In 1970, during work to heighten the dam, the lion was dismantled and moved as a precaution. After the dam construction was completed, it took 40 days to restore the lion to its eastward-facing position atop the wall. A lion is sometimes used as an emblem in promotional materials and tourist brochures for the Vesdre area.

== Selected bibliography ==
- M. Bodnon, E. Detienne, F. LeClercq, "Le Barrage de la Gileppe," Revue universelle des mines, de la métallurgie, de travaux publics 39 (1876) 610–650, full text online.
- Easton Devonshire, "The Gileppe Dam," Transactions of the British Association of Waterworks Engineers 9 (1904) 262–270. Detailed description (in English) of the works, based on Bodnon, Detienne, and LeClercq.
- Abstract in English translation of Bodson, Detienne, and LeClercq in Minutes of Proceedings of the Institution of Civil Engineers 48 (1877), pp. 312–314.
- Edward Wegmann, The Design and Construction of Dams (New York, 1907, 5th ed.).
- Informational sign at the dam.
