= 2016 Milan–San Remo =

2016 UCI World Tour, race 4 of 28
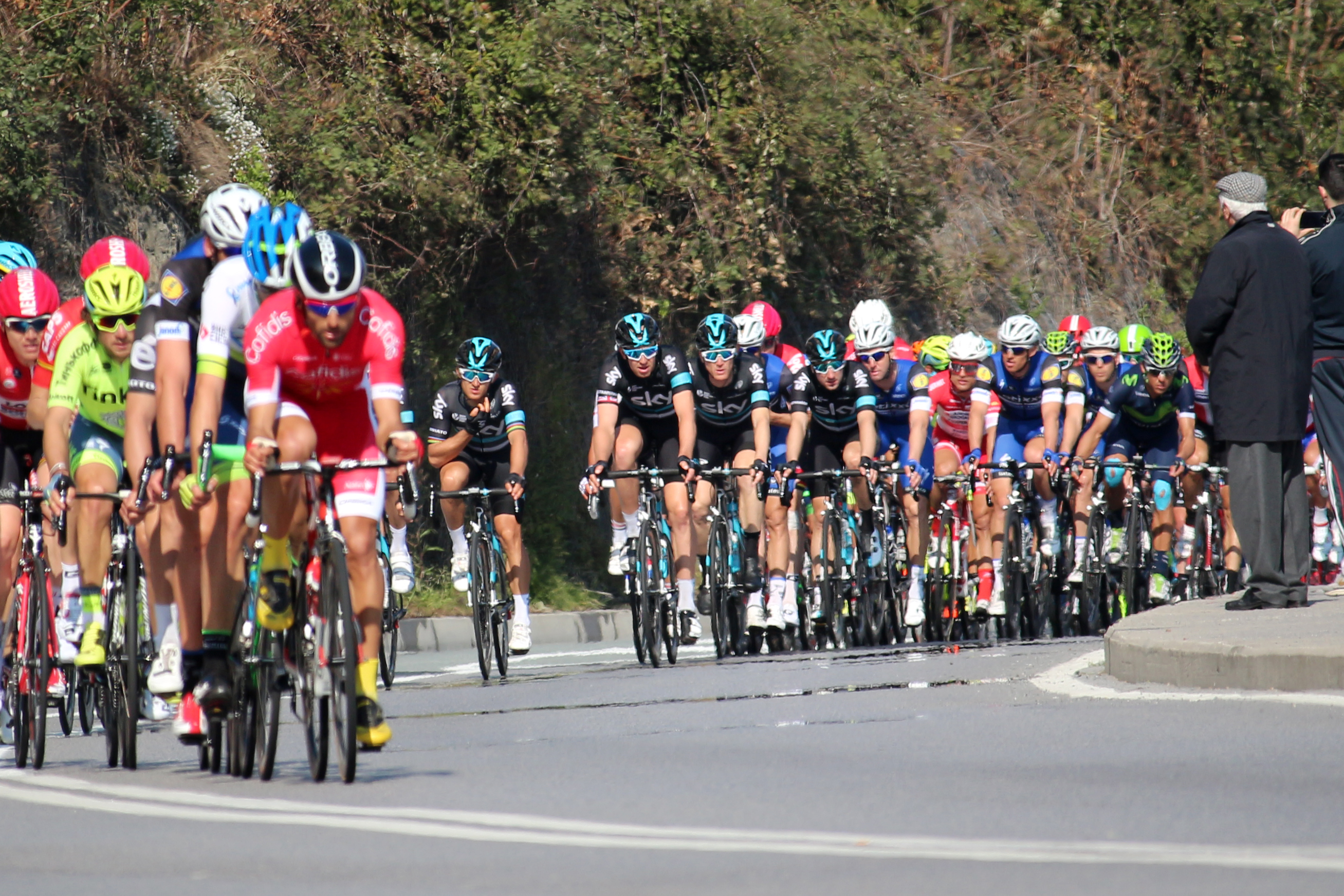
- The peloton in Savona

Race details
- Dates: 19 March 2016
- Stages: 1
- Distance: 295 km (183 mi)
- Winning time: 6h 54' 45"

Results
	Winner	Arnaud Démare (FRA)	(FDJ)
	Second	Ben Swift (GBR)	(Team Sky)
	Third	Jürgen Roelandts (BEL)	(Lotto–Soudal)

The 107th edition of the Milan–San Remo cycling classic took place on Saturday, 19 March 2016. It was the fourth of 28 races of the 2016 UCI World Tour; the first one-day race. It was also the first cycling monument of the season.

It was won by Arnaud Démare in a sprint finish, ahead of Ben Swift (Team Sky) and Jürgen Roelandts (Lotto–Soudal). The finish was disrupted by a crash involving Fernando Gaviria (Etixx–Quick-Step), causing several riders to take avoiding action, ruling them out of contention. A landslide on the road caused the race to be diverted for a length of 9 km (5.6 mi).

== Route ==
As one of the sports monuments, Milan–San Remo is among the highest-rated races in professional cycling. The 2016 route was set to be 291 km (181 mi) long. Generally considered a sprinters' classic, the race ran from the Via della Chiesa Rossa in Milan to the traditional finish on San Remo's Via Roma. The final part of the race included the climbs of the Cipressa and the Poggio, which usually proved decisive for the race outcome. Across the road, the riders also had to tackle the 35 km (22 mi) climb of the Passo dello Turchino, although it was not considered to be a key point in the race. After the Turchino, the route followed the Aurelia road along the coast from Genoa all the way to the finish in San Remo. With a little over 50 km (31 mi) left to go, the first of the coastal climbs started with the Capo Mele, the Capo Cervo and the Capo Berta, before meeting the final two climbs leading to the finish.

A landslide on the morning of the race at a point 130 km (81 mi) into the race caused the route to be slightly changed, with the riders taking a 9 km (5.6 mi) detour along the A10 highway, entering in Genova Voltri and exiting in Arenzano, rejoining the original course at that point. As a consequence, the race ran over a distance of 295 km (183 mi).

== Participating teams ==
25 teams were announced to take part in the race: all 18 World Tour teams were automatically invited; seven continental teams were given wildcards – totalling 200 riders. As Moreno Hofland (LottoNL–Jumbo) was unable to start due to illness, 199 riders took part in the race.

UCI WorldTeams

- AG2R La Mondiale
- Astana
- BMC Racing Team
- Team Dimension Data
- Etixx–Quick-Step
- FDJ
- IAM Cycling
- Lampre–Merida
- Lotto–Soudal
- Movistar Team
- Team Giant–Alpecin
- Team Katusha
- LottoNL–Jumbo
- Team Sky
- Tinkoff
- Trek–Segafredo
- Cannondale
- Orica–GreenEDGE

UCI Professional Continental teams

- Androni Giocattoli–Sidermec
- Bardiani–CSF
- Bora–Argon 18
- CCC–Sprandi–Polkowice
- Cofidis
- Team Novo Nordisk
- Southeast–Venezuela

== Pre-race favourites ==
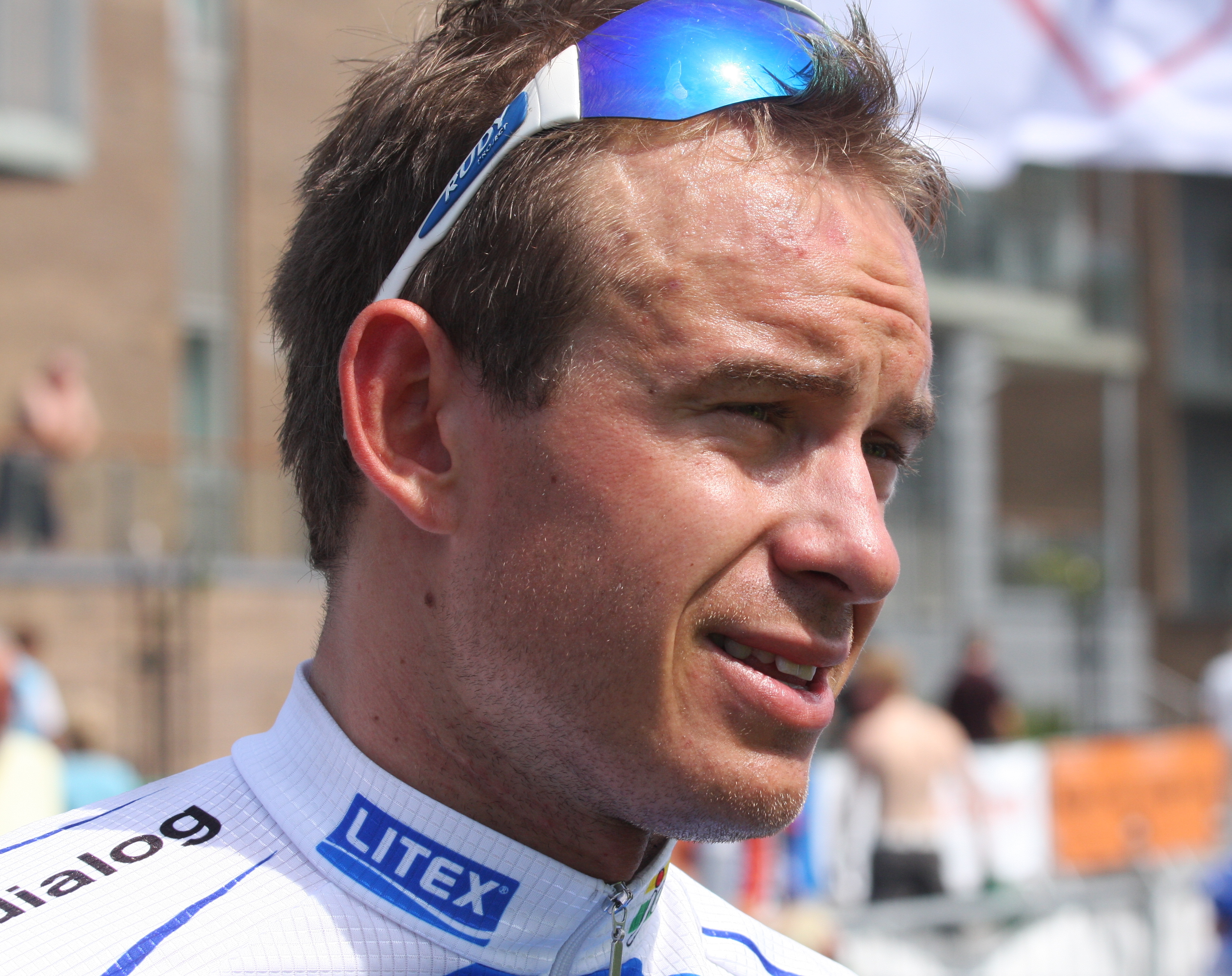
Alexander Kristoff (pictured in 2009) was considered to be the main favourite for victory.

The outgoing champion, John Degenkolb, missed Milan–San Remo after injuries sustained in an early-season training camp in Spain. In his absence, 2014 winner Alexander Kristoff (Team Katusha) was tipped as the main favourite for the victory. Fabian Cancellara (Trek–Segafredo) was also rated highly in what would be his final appearance in the race, as he was a former winner and had shown strong form, winning Strade Bianche earlier in the season. World Champion Peter Sagan (Tinkoff) was also named as a race favourite, as he had shown good form, albeit still lacking a win in 2016. He rode with bib number one in the absence of Degenkolb.

Two riders came into Milan–San Remo with particular successes in hand, namely Michael Matthews (Orica–GreenEDGE), who had won two stages at Paris–Nice just a week earlier, while Greg van Avermaet (BMC Racing Team) had won the overall classification at Tirreno–Adriatico. Other favourites included Alejandro Valverde (Movistar Team), Niccolo Bonifazio (Trek–Segafredo), Ben Swift, Geraint Thomas and Michał Kwiatkowski (all Team Sky), Nacer Bouhanni (Cofidis), Zdeněk Štybar (Etixx–Quick-Step), Sacha Modolo (Lampre–Merida), Tony Gallopin (Lotto–Soudal), Arnaud Démare (FDJ), Edvald Boasson Hagen (Team Dimension Data) and Simon Clarke (Cannondale). 2009 winner Mark Cavendish (Team Dimension Data) was also named as a favourite. Meanwhile, Astana named Vincenzo Nibali as their captain for the race, riding the race for the tenth time in his career. Another rider deemed a possible contender, Tom Dumoulin (Team Giant–Alpecin), was ruled out of the race due to a flu. German sprinter André Greipel (Lotto–Soudal) missed the race as well after breaking three ribs at the Volta ao Algarve.

== Race report ==
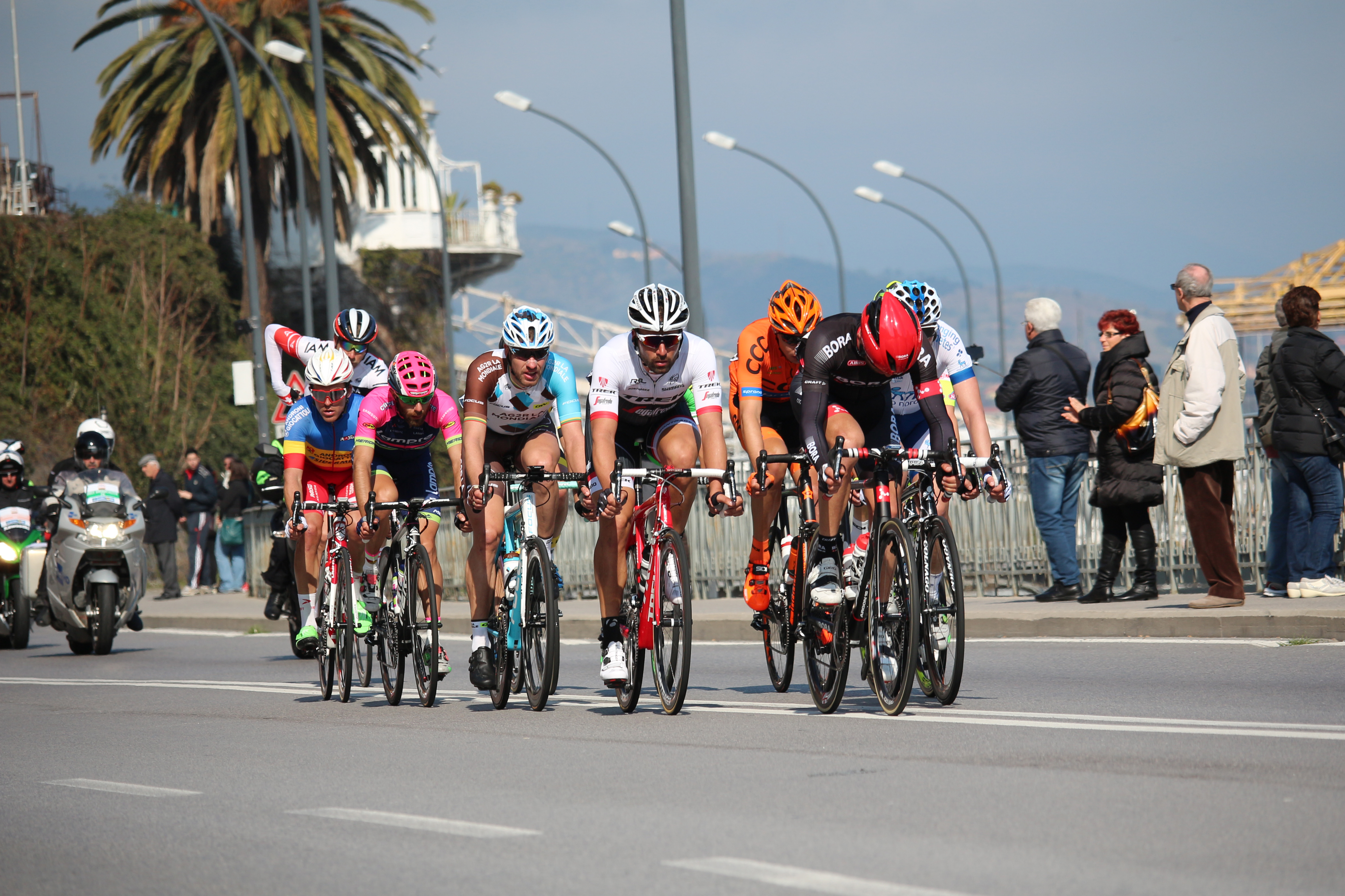
The breakaway in Savona

After the race started in Milan, a breakaway got clear after 14 km (8.7 mi) of racing, including Gediminas Bagdonas (AG2R La Mondiale), Serghei Țvetcov (Androni Giocattoli–Sidermec), Mirco Maestri (Bardiani–CSF), Jan Bárta (Bora–Argon 18), Adrian Kurek (CCC–Sprandi–Polkowice), Roger Kluge (IAM Cycling), Matteo Bono (Lampre–Merida), Samuele Conti (Southeast–Venezuela), Maarten Tjallingii (LottoNL–Jumbo), Andrea Peron (Team Novo Nordisk) and Marco Coledan (Trek–Segafredo). The group had a maximum lead over the peloton of 10:35 minutes at the 50 km (31 mi) mark. After that, Tinkoff and Orica–GreenEDGE began to set a higher tempo in the pack and the lead was reduced to five minutes at the peak of the Turchino.

As the leading group arrived at the first seaside climb of the Capo Mele, the gap had come down to 2:18 minutes. Meanwhile, the first crashes occurred in the field, with Julien Vermote (Etixx–Quick-Step) and Federico Zurlo (Lampre–Merida) being the first victims. At the Capo Berta, the lead of the front group was around a minute, while Marco Haller (Team Katusha) crashed on the following descent, dropping out of the main field. Another accident occurred a little later. Michael Matthews and Peter Kennaugh (Team Sky) were the most prominent riders to go down, but both managed to get back into the field even with a growing pace set at the front.

The breakaway group was caught with 25 km (16 mi) to go. At the climb of the Cipressa, Giovanni Visconti (Movistar Team) and Ian Stannard (Team Sky) attacked and were joined by Daniel Oss (BMC Racing Team), Matteo Montaguti (AG2R La Mondiale), and Fabio Sabatini (Etixx–Quick-Step) on the descent. Arnaud Démare crashed on the climb, but was able to reach the field again as it got back to the attacking group at the bottom of the Poggio. Team Katusha set the pace up the final climb, but Michał Kwiatkowski broke clear 6 km (3.7 mi) from the finish. Vincenzo Nibali chased after him on the descent and the group of favourites came back together at the run-in to the finish, after Fabian Cancellara had put in an attack, marked by Matteo Trentin (Etixx–Quick-Step). At the 1 km (0.62 mi) mark, Edvald Boasson Hagen started one last attack, but to no avail as the group approached the finish together. Shortly before the line, a touch of wheels led to a crash by Fernando Gaviria (Etixx–Quick-Step), which caused several riders to lose momentum, including Peter Sagan. In the following mass sprint, Arnaud Démare came out on top and won his first ever cycling monument, ahead of Ben Swift and Jürgen Roelandts (Lotto–Soudal). Démare was the first Frenchman to win Milan–San Remo since Laurent Jalabert in 1995, and the first Frenchman to win a monument race since Jalabert's victory in the 1997 Giro di Lombardia.

== Post-race ==
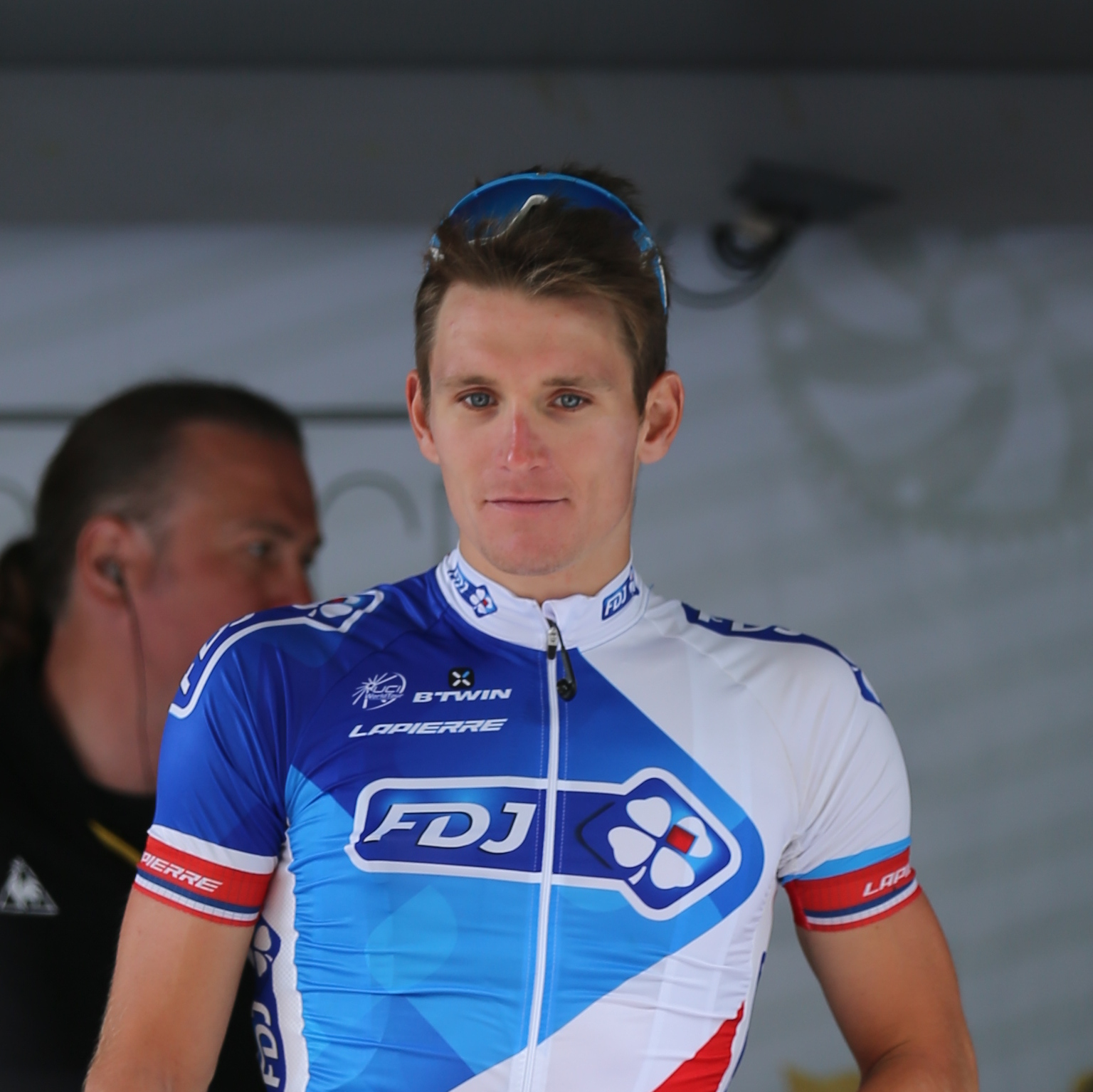
Race winner Arnaud Démare (pictured in 2015)

Following the race, Démare expressed delight at his victory, saying: "There are days like this one in which everything works despite the occasional hiccup, like crashing at the bottom of the Cipressa. I made it across at the bottom of the Poggio and the entire way I felt fantastic. [...] This is a big one and has been running for over a century. It's extraordinary. I'm extremely happy." Second placed Swift on the other hand, was disappointed by missing out on a possible win: "Obviously, it's quite disappointing to get second – so close to the win – but you have got to be happy to be back on the podium in a Monument." Fernando Gaviria shed tears after his late fall, which he felt cost him a possible victory: "I am very sad about what happened. It was my fault, I was in a perfect position but then I lost my focus for two seconds, because I began thinking on how to sprint. I touched the wheel of the guy in front of me. That was enough to throw away all the hard work of the team." Nacer Bouhanni in turn was furious after the finish. Some hundred metres before the finish line, he had been in a good position before his chain slipped off, taking away his chances. After crossing the line, he threw away his bike in anger.

Two riders very disappointed with their results were Michael Matthews and Fabian Cancellara. Matthews crashed at high speed shortly before the Cipressa and arrived at the finish with a bandaged right elbow. He said: "Obviously I'm devastated. [...] This was everything, this was my world championships for the start of the season. [...] I was really looking forward to making a good finale, it's really unfortunate that a crash stopped me from doing that." Cancellara, who was riding the event for the last time before retirement at the end of the 2016 season, was held up in Gaviria's crash after having stayed in the leading group. He described his final kilometres as difficult, as he had been isolated from his teammates, saying that the other riders mainly attacked him and did not work with him. Another rider who was almost involved when Gaviria fell was Peter Sagan, who confirmed that the peloton had covered Cancellara in particular. He went on to describe the moment of Gaviria's crash: "Then I got away with Boasson Hagen, Gaviria and someone else. Then with about 500 metres to go, Gaviria looked around because the group was coming up. He went down and I only just managed to avoid him. I stayed up but I lost a lot speed and never managed to get going again in the final metres."

One day after the race, both Matteo Tosatto (Tinkoff) and Eros Capecchi (Astana) accused Démare of having used the tow of his teamcar to rejoin the pack after his crash before the Cipressa climb. Démare rebuffed these allegations, saying that the race commissioners were right behind him and would have disqualified him, had he done something illegal. On 8 May 2016, it became public that the Italian Cycling Federation was making inquiries into the accusations about Démare, with Tosatto saying that he had given written testimony to officials about the incident.

== Results ==
Result^{1}
Rank	Rider	Team	Time
1	Arnaud Démare (FRA)	FDJ	6hr 54' 45"
2	Ben Swift (GBR)	Team Sky	+0"
3	Jürgen Roelandts (BEL)	Lotto–Soudal	+0"
4	Nacer Bouhanni (FRA)	Cofidis	+0"
5	Greg Van Avermaet (BEL)	BMC Racing Team	+0"
6	Alexander Kristoff (NOR)	Team Katusha	+0"
7	Heinrich Haussler (AUS)	IAM Cycling	+0"
8	Filippo Pozzato (ITA)	Southeast–Venezuela	+0"
9	Sonny Colbrelli (ITA)	Bardiani–CSF	+0"
10	Matteo Trentin (ITA)	Etixx–Quick-Step	+0"
Source: ProCyclingStats

^1 — Top ten riders out of 180 finishers shown
