= Evgeny Kobernyak =

Russian cyclist

Personal information
- Full name: Evgeny Aleksandrovich Kobernyak
- Born: January 24, 1995 (age 31) Saint Petersburg, Russia

Cycling career
- Sport: Cycling
- Current team: Retired
- Discipline: Road
- Role: Rider

Amateur teams
- 2015: Sestroretsk
- 2015: GFDD Altopack
- 2017: Gazprom–RusVelo U23

Professional teams
- 2017: Gazprom–RusVelo (stagiaire)
- 2018–2019: Gazprom–RusVelo

Evgeny Aleksandrovich Kobernyak (Russian: Евгений Александрович Коберняк; born 24 January 1995) is a Russian former professional cyclist, who rode professionally for the Gazprom–RusVelo team in 2018 and 2019.

== Major results ==
2017
3rd Overall Five Rings of Moscow
