= J. Augustine DeSazilly =

French engineer

J. Augustine DeSazilly (fl. mid-19th century) was a French engineer.

In the early 1850s, DeSazilly published a paper postulating the "profile of equal resistance," a major theoretical advance in the technology of masonry gravity dams, based on the hydrostatic force exerted by a given height of water in relation to the weight of masonry used in the dam's construction (estimated at 150 pounds per cubic foot). DeSazilly considered two extreme conditions, a filled reservoir and an empty reservoir, and created a model for equalizing stresses on the masonry across every horizontal cross section. He developed a vertical cross section in which the stresses at the upstream face of a masonry gravity dam with the reservoir empty are equal to those at the downstream face with the reservoir filled. His hypothesis provided a means of calculating the minimum amount of material that could be used while assuring stability. Although he himself never carried out the construction of a dam on this "profile of equal resistance," it was used in 1858 to build the Furens Dam across the river Loire.

DeSazilly also developed a process of surface drainage for building on a slope, and contributed to the building of railways, roads, and bridges.
