= Tom Stubbe =

Belgian cyclist

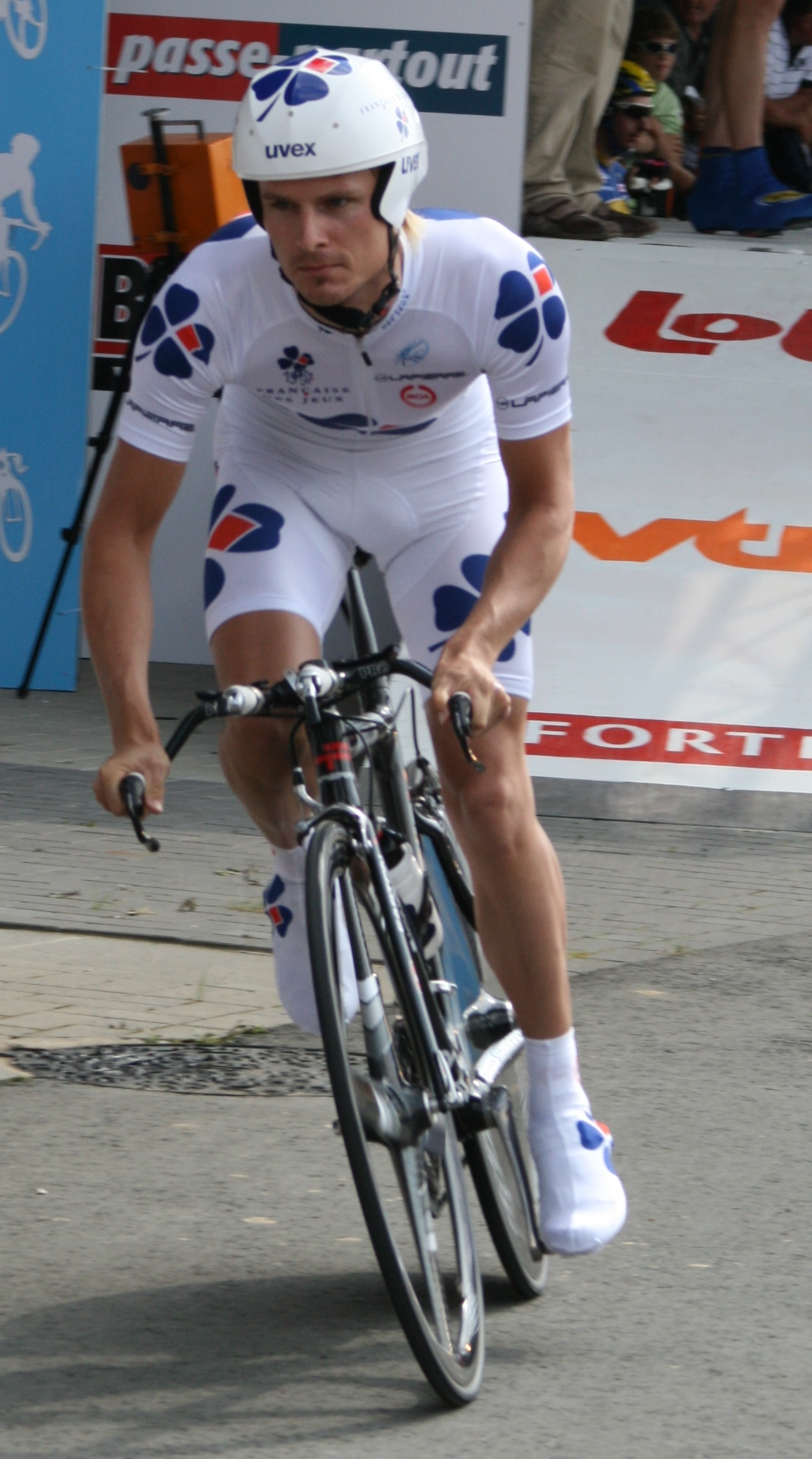

Personal information
- Full name: Tom Stubbe
- Born: 26 May 1981 (age 45) Blankenberge, Belgium
- Height: 1.77 m (5 ft 10 in)
- Weight: 66 kg (146 lb; 10.4 st)

Cycling career
- Sport: Cycling
- Current team: Retired
- Discipline: Road
- Role: Rider

Amateur team
- 2004: Relax-Bodysol (trainee)

Professional teams
- 2005–2007: Chocolade Jacques–T Interim
- 2008: Française des Jeux
- 2009–2010: Silence–Lotto
- 2011: Donckers Koffie–Jelly Belly

Tom Stubbe (born 26 May 1981) is a Belgian former professional road bicycle racer. Stubbe started as a professional in 2005.

== Palmarès ==
2004
1st, Overall, Tour du Loir-et-Cher
3rd, National Amateur Time Trial Championship
2006
3rd, Overall, Tour de l'Avenir
