= Lake Gileppe =

Lake in Belgium

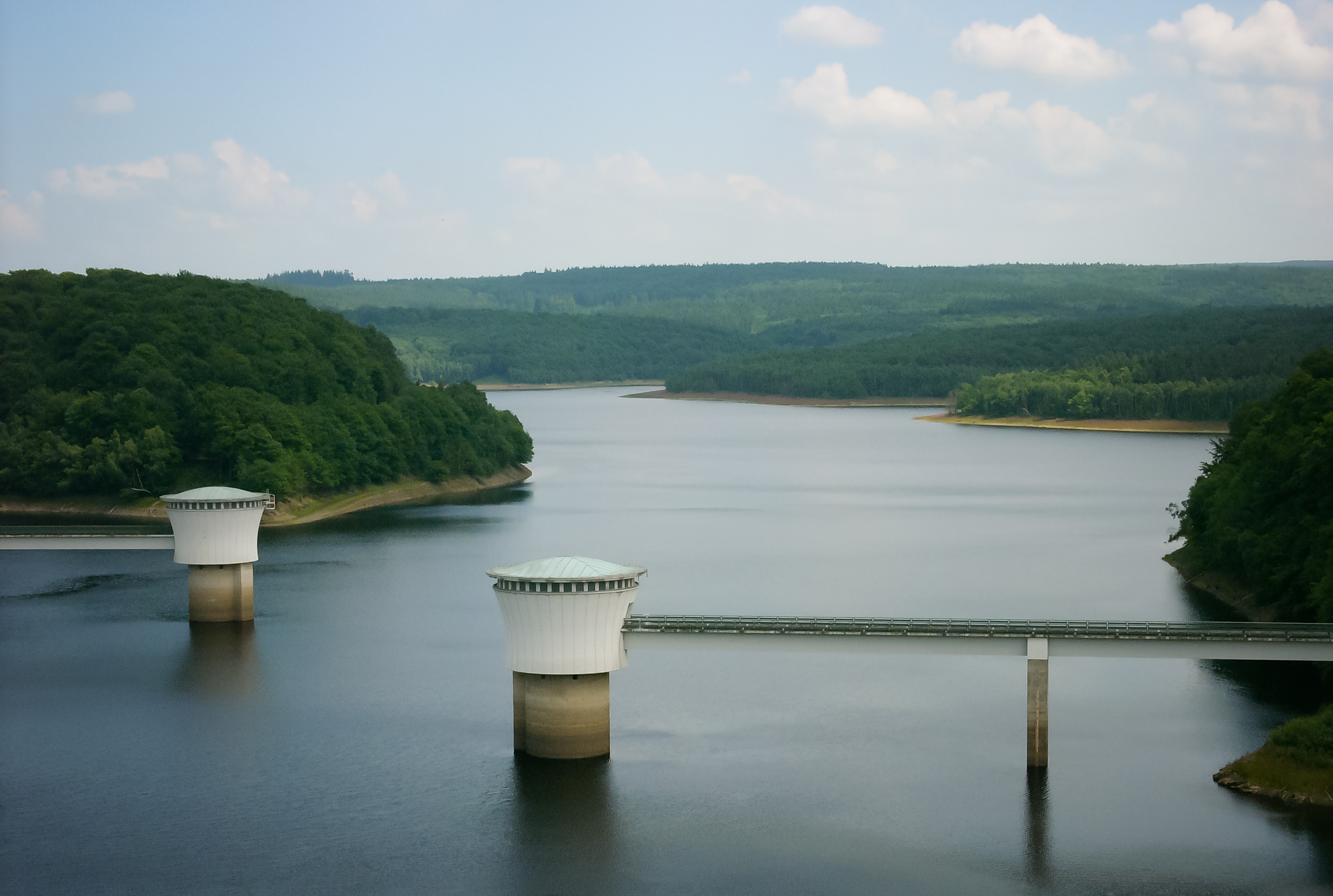

- Location within Belgium
- Coordinates: 50°35′08″N 05°59′24″E
- Basin countries: Wallonia, Belgium
- Max. length: 2.5 km (1.6 mi)
- Max. width: 1 km (0.62 mi)
- Surface area: 1.3 km^{2} (0.50 sq mi)
- Water volume: 26.4×10^{6} m^{3} (21,400 acre⋅ft)
- Surface elevation: 361 m (1,184 ft)
- Islands: 0
- Settlements: Verviers

Lake Gileppe (French: Lac de la Gileppe, pronounced [lak də la ʒilɛp]) is located in Wallonia, in the east of Belgium, near the city of Verviers. There is a 78 m high panoramic tower with a restaurant on the top to look at the lake and the landscape. The water volume is 26,400,000 m^{3} and the area is 1,3 km^{2}. The Gileppe Dam contains the lake and was built in 1869.
