= Jürgen Roelandts =

Road bicycle racer (born 1985)

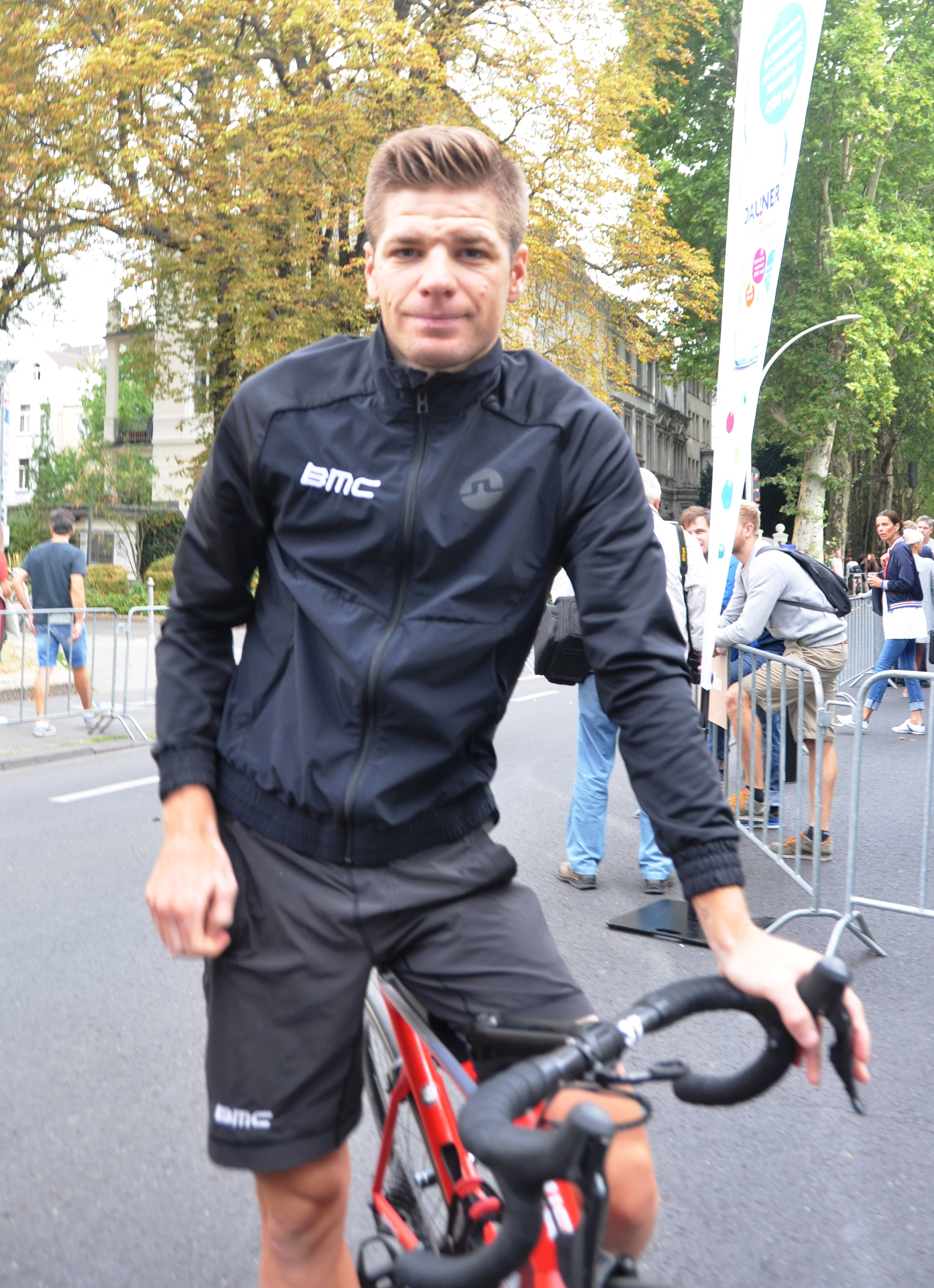
- Roelandts at the 2018 Deutschland Tour

Personal information
- Full name: Jürgen Roelandts
- Born: 2 July 1985 (age 41) Asse, Belgium
- Height: 1.85 m (6 ft 1 in)
- Weight: 78 kg (172 lb)

Cycling career
- Sport: Cycling
- Current team: Movistar Team
- Discipline: Road
- Role: Rider (retired); Directeur sportif
- Rider type: Classics rider

Amateur teams
- 2004: Jong Vlaanderen 2016
- 2005–2007: Bodysol–Win for Life–Jong Vlaanderen

Professional teams
- 2008–2017: Silence–Lotto
- 2018: BMC Racing Team
- 2019–2020: Movistar Team

Managerial teams
- 2021: Trinity Racing
- 2023–: Movistar Team

Major wins
- One-day races and Classics National Road Race Championships (2008)

Jürgen Roelandts (born 2 July 1985) is a Belgian former professional road bicycle racer, who rode professionally between 2008 and 2020, for the Lotto–Soudal, BMC Racing Team and Movistar Team squads. He now works as a directeur sportif for his final professional team, Movistar Team.

== Career ==
In 2013, he achieved a very prestigious placing, finishing third in the Tour of Flanders. In the 2015 Gent–Wevelgem, after being in a solo breakaway for 50 kilometres (31 miles) in difficult weather conditions, Roelandts got passed by the group of chasers with 20 kilometres (12 miles) to go but managed to resist to the return of the peloton, finishing seventh. In June 2015, Roelandts came in second place at the Belgian National Road Race Championships, losing out after a two-man break with Preben Van Hecke.

== Major results ==
2001
1st Time trial, National Cadet Road Championships
2002
National Junior Road Championships

1st Road race
3rd Time trial

2003
3rd Time trial, National Junior Road Championships
2004
3rd Omloop van het Houtland
2005
3rd Duo Normand (with Dominique Cornu)
5th Grand Prix de la ville de Pérenchies
8th Nationale Sluitingsprijs
2006
1st Stage 2 Tour de Normandie
1st Stage 2 Tour du Loir-et-Cher
3rd Circuit de Wallonie
4th Omloop van de Vlaamse Scheldeboorden
6th Ronde Van Vlaanderen Beloften
7th Overall Tour de Bretagne

1st Points classification

8th Schaal Sels
2007
1st Paris–Tours Espoirs
2nd Overall Ronde van Vlaams-Brabant

1st Stage 3

4th Kattekoers
4th Omloop van de Vlaamse Scheldeboorden
5th Overall Tour du Loir-et-Cher
7th Overall Tour de Bretagne

1st Points classification

10th Circuit de Wallonie
10th Nationale Sluitingsprijs
2008
1st Road race, National Road Championships
1st Stage 5 Tour de Pologne
2nd Nokere Koerse
3rd Overall Circuit Franco-Belge

1st Stage 3

3rd Memorial Rik Van Steenbergen
5th Overall Tour of Qatar
6th Overall Volta ao Algarve
6th Tour de Rijke
7th Ronde van het Groene Hart
8th Omloop van de Vlaamse Scheldeboorden
9th Overall Eneco Tour

1st Points classification

10th Grote Prijs Jef Scherens
2009
1st Points classification Tour de Pologne
3rd Tour de Rijke
4th Dutch Food Valley Classic
4th Grote Prijs Stad Zottegem
5th Overall Four Days of Dunkirk
8th Overall Tour of Belgium

1st Sprints classification

2010
3rd Memorial Rik Van Steenbergen
6th Gent–Wevelgem
8th Overall Tour Down Under

1st Young rider classification

9th Grand Prix de Wallonie
10th Overall Eneco Tour
2011
2nd E3 Prijs Vlaanderen
4th Grand Prix Cycliste de Montréal
5th Road race, UCI Road World Championships
6th Vattenfall Cyclassics
9th Omloop Het Nieuwsblad
2012
1st Overall Tour de l'Eurométropole

1st Points classification
1st Stage 1

1st Stage 4 Tour de Luxembourg
3rd Overall Ster ZLM Toer
5th GP Ouest–France
7th Road race, Olympic Games
7th Grand Prix Cycliste de Montréal
2013
3rd Tour of Flanders
4th GP Ouest–France
7th Overall Tour Méditerranéen

1st Points classification
1st Stage 5

8th Overall Tour of Belgium
8th Omloop Het Nieuwsblad
9th Overall Ster ZLM Toer
2014
3rd Overall Tour of Qatar
10th Gent–Wevelgem
10th GP Ouest–France
2015
2nd Road race, National Road Championships
3rd Overall Tour de l'Eurométropole

1st Points classification

5th GP Ouest–France
7th E3 Harelbeke
7th Gent–Wevelgem
8th Tour of Flanders
2016
3rd Milan–San Remo
3rd Binche–Chimay–Binche
7th Gent–Wevelgem
10th Tour de l'Eurométropole
2017
4th Scheldeprijs
4th Vuelta a Murcia
2018
1st Gullegem Koerse
Volta a la Comunitat Valenciana

1st Stages 3 (TTT) & 5

5th Milan–San Remo
2019
8th Trofeo Andratx–Lloseta
2020
7th Giro della Toscana
10th Kuurne–Brussels–Kuurne

=== Grand Tour general classification results timeline ===
| Grand Tour | 2009 | 2010 | 2011 | 2012 | 2013 | 2014 | 2015 | 2016 | 2017 | 2018 |
|---|---|---|---|---|---|---|---|---|---|---|
| Giro d'Italia | — | — | — | — | — | — | — | DNF | — | 124 |
| Tour de France | — | 118 | 83 | 104 | 160 | 111 | — | 126 | 136 | — |
| / Vuelta a España | 119 | — | — | — | — | — | — | — | — | — |

=== Classic results timeline ===
| Monument | 2008 | 2009 | 2010 | 2011 | 2012 | 2013 | 2014 | 2015 | 2016 | 2017 | 2018 | 2019 | 2020 |
|---|---|---|---|---|---|---|---|---|---|---|---|---|---|
| Milan–San Remo | — | 90 | 101 | 34 | — | 16 | 23 | 11 | 3 | 83 | 5 | 149 | — |
| Tour of Flanders | — | — | 86 | 54 | — | 3 | DNF | 8 | 17 | DNF | 27 | 68 | — |
| Paris–Roubaix | DNF | — | 39 | 14 | — | 43 | — | 21 | 78 | 22 | DNF | DNF | NH |
| Liège–Bastogne–Liège | Did not contest during his career | | | | | | | | | | | | |
| Giro di Lombardia | Did not contest during his career | | | | | | | | | | | | |
| Classic | 2008 | 2009 | 2010 | 2011 | 2012 | 2013 | 2014 | 2015 | 2016 | 2017 | 2018 | 2019 | 2020 |
| Omloop Het Nieuwsblad | — | — | 29 | 9 | — | 8 | 13 | — | 20 | 15 | DNF | 25 | 16 |
| Kuurne–Brussels–Kuurne | — | 61 | 15 | 106 | — | NH | 58 | — | 39 | 11 | — | 28 | 10 |
| Strade Bianche | — | — | — | — | — | — | — | — | 45 | DNF | — | — | — |
| Dwars door Vlaanderen | 43 | — | 23 | 107 | — | — | — | — | — | 71 | 27 | 20 | NH |
| E3 BinckBank Classic | 78 | DNF | — | 2 | — | 60 | 12 | 7 | DNF | — | 12 | DNF | NH |
| Gent–Wevelgem | 118 | — | 6 | — | — | DNF | 10 | 7 | 7 | 41 | 95 | 60 | — |
| Scheldeprijs | 34 | — | — | — | — | — | — | — | — | 4 | — | — | — |
| Amstel Gold Race | — | — | — | — | — | — | — | 66 | 96 | — | — | — | NH |
| Bretagne Classic | — | DNF | — | 53 | 5 | 4 | 10 | 5 | DNF | — | — | DNF | — |

Legend
| — | Did not compete |
| DNF | Did not finish |
| DSQ | Disqualified |
| NH | Not held |
