= Sven Vandousselaere =

Belgian cyclist

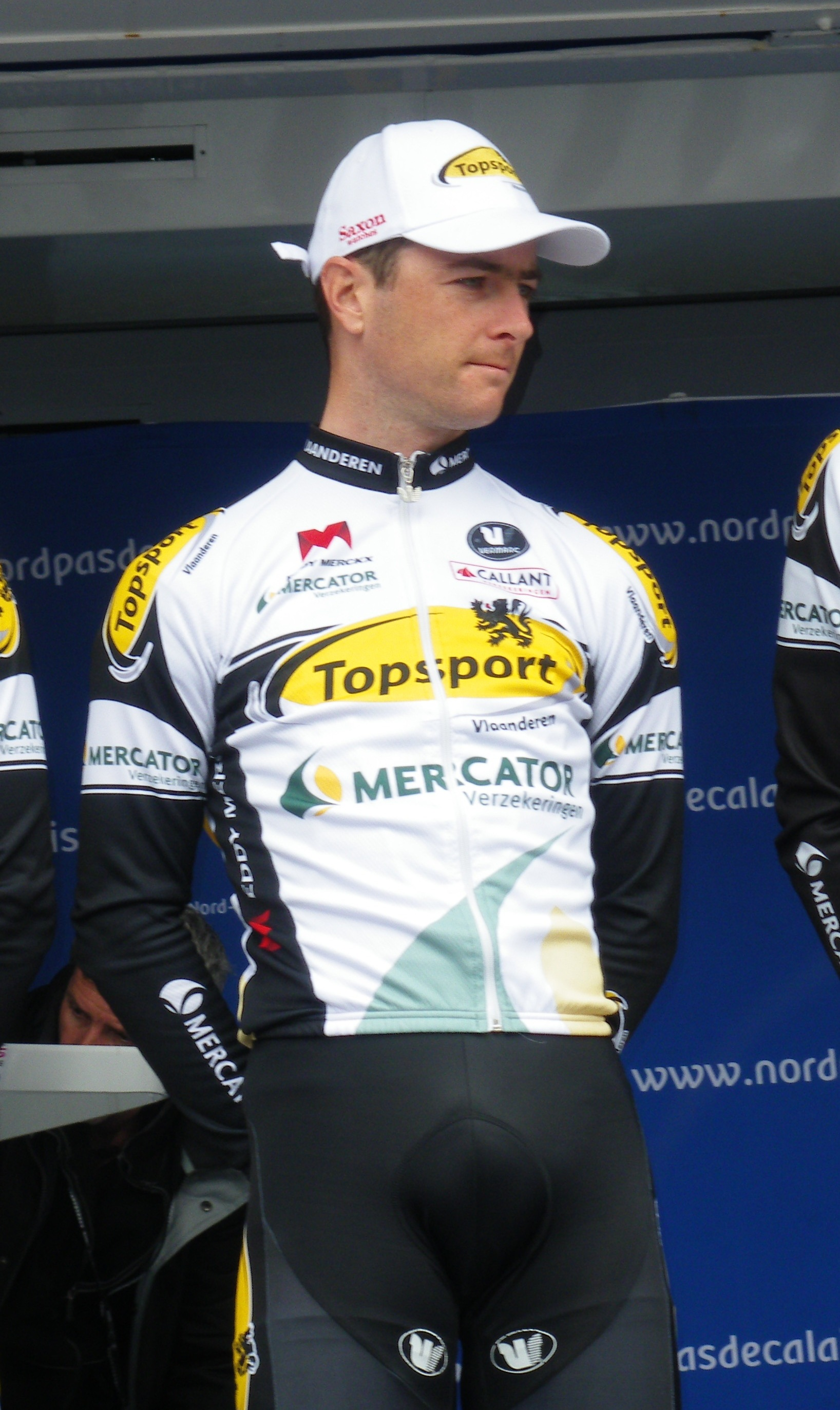

Personal information
- Born: 29 August 1988 (age 38) Bruges, Belgium

Cycling career
- Sport: Cycling
- Discipline: Road
- Role: Rider

Amateur teams
- 2004–2005: Dgr Cycling Team Vorselaar
- 2006: Koninklijke Balen BC
- 2007–2010: Davitamon–Win For Life–Jong Vlaanderen

Professional teams
- 2011: Omega Pharma–Lotto
- 2012–2013: Topsport Vlaanderen–Mercator
- 2014: Vastgoedservice–Golden Palace

Sven Vandousselaere (born 29 August 1988 in Bruges) is a Belgian cyclist.

== Palmarès ==
2005
1st Aalst-Saint-Trond
2nd Flanders-Europe Classic Geraardsbergen
2nd Wortegem Koerse
2006
1st Junior Tour of Flanders
1st stages 1 and 2 Giro di Toscana juniors
1st stages 1 and 3 Kroz Istru
1st Omloop Mandel-Leie-Schelde
2nd International Junioren Driedaagse

1st stage 1

2nd Liège-La Gleize
2nd Étoile du Sud-Limbourg

1st stage 3

3rd Paris–Roubaix juniors
2007
1st stage 2 Tour de Lleida
2008
1st stage 4 Tour de la province d'Anvers
2009
1st stage 4 Tour du Loir-et-Cher
2nd Internatie Reningelst
3rd Tour du Loir-et-Cher
2010
1st stage 5 Tour de Normandie
3rd Ronde van Vlaanderen U23
2012
3rd Belgian National Road Race Championships
2013
3rd Omloop Het Nieuwsblad
