= 2009 Eneco Tour =

2009 UCI World Ranking, race 21 of 24
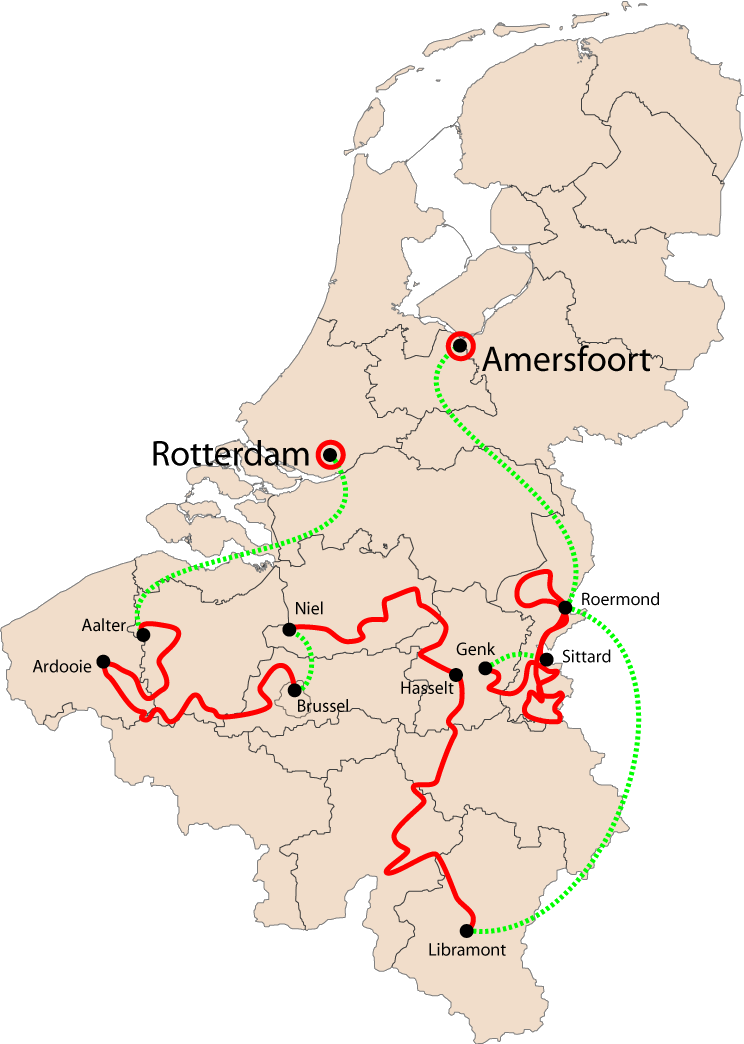

Race details
- Dates: 18—25 August 2009
- Stages: 7+Prologue
- Distance: 1,128.1 km (701.0 mi)
- Winning time: 26h 49' 40"

Results
Jersey awarded to the overall winner	Winner	Edvald Boasson Hagen (NOR)	(Team Columbia–HTC)
	Second	Sylvain Chavanel (FRA)	(Quick-Step)
	Third	Sebastian Langeveld (NED)	(Rabobank)
Jersey awarded to the points classification winner	Points	Edvald Boasson Hagen (NOR)	(Team Columbia–HTC)
	Team	Rabobank	

The 2009 Eneco Tour was the fifth edition of the Eneco Tour cycling stage race. It took place from 18 August to 25 August 2009 in the Benelux. Like the previous years, parts of the Netherlands and Belgium were covered. It was part of the inaugural UCI World Ranking. It began with a short individual time trial in Rotterdam and ended with a longer one in Amersfoort.

== Teams ==
As the Tour of Benelux is a UCI ProTour event, all 18 ProTeams were invited automatically and obligated to send a squad. Three UCI Professional Continental teams, Skil–Shimano, Topsport Vlaanderen–Mercator, and Vacansoleil were also invited to the race, for a total of 21 teams. Each team was allowed eight riders, though Euskaltel–Euskadi sent only seven and Team Milram had a rider who planned to start withdraw due to injury before the prologue, meaning 166 riders began the event.

The 21 teams participating in the race are:

- Ag2r–La Mondiale
- Astana
- Bbox Bouygues Telecom
- Caisse d'Epargne
- Cofidis
- Euskaltel–Euskadi
- Française des Jeux
- Fuji–Servetto
- Garmin–Slipstream
- Lampre–NGC
- Liquigas–Doimo
- Quick-Step
- Rabobank
- Silence–Lotto
- Skil–Shimano
- Team Columbia–HTC
- Team Katusha
- Team Milram
- Team Saxo Bank
- Topsport Vlaanderen–Mercator
- Vacansoleil

== Stages ==
=== Prologue ===
18 August 2009 - Rotterdam (Netherlands), 4.4 km (ITT)

The course for the prologue time trial was a quick, flat trip through downtown Rotterdam, taking a lap around the city's Southern Park. The course was not at all technical; it contained only gentle turns to form a rectangle, along with long straightaways.

Quick Step's Sylvain Chavanel picked up his second victory of the season in the prologue. Chavanel was one of the first men to take the course, and had to wait for ninety minutes to see if his time would hold up. His biggest threat came from Garmin-Slipstream rider Tyler Farrar, who clocked in .23 seconds slower than Chavanel. The Frenchman took the first leader's white jersey.

Prologue Result and General Classification after the Prologue

	Cyclist	Team	Time
1	Sylvain Chavanel (FRA)	Quick-Step	4' 55"
2	Tyler Farrar (USA)	Garmin–Slipstream	+ 1"
3	Tom Boonen (BEL)	Quick-Step	+ 1"
4	Bradley Wiggins (GBR)	Garmin–Slipstream	+ 2"
5	Joost Posthuma (NED)	Rabobank	+ 2"
6	Vincenzo Nibali (ITA)	Liquigas–Doimo	+ 4"
7	Juan Antonio Flecha (ESP)	Rabobank	+ 4"
8	Edvald Boasson Hagen (NOR)	Team Columbia–HTC	+ 5"
9	Maarten Tjallingii (NED)	Rabobank	+ 5"
10	Nikolas Maes (BEL)	Topsport Vlaanderen–Mercator	+ 5"

=== Stage 1 ===
19 August 2009 - Aalter (Belgium) to Ardooie (Belgium), 185.4 km

The first mass-start stage was flat, with a couple of small rises in elevation near the finish line.

A five-rider breakaway formed after 18 km in the saddle, involving Lars Bak, Maciej Bodnar, Yukiya Arashiro, Wim De Vocht, and Pieter Vanspeybrouck. Their maximum advantage over the peloton was 3'50". The top teams in the general classification, Quick Step and Garmin-Slipstream, worked to bring the breakaway back, since they also had strong sprinters who they wanted to try for the stage win. At the 85 km mark, Bobbie Traksel, Luis Pasamontes and Wim Stroetinga crashed, and Pasamontes and Stroetinga had to leave the race with injuries. The breakaway gradually fragmented because of the pace and the day's heat. Bodnar was the last escapee to be caught, with 5 km to go before the finish.

The mass sprint finish was won by Tyler Farrar, who became the new race leader. The sprint was perhaps overshadowed, however, by a dramatic crash that took place right behind it. About ten riders deep in the bunch, two riders collided, and the remainder of the peloton, in full sprint, had no chance to avoid them, leading to further crashes. All 144 riders who started the sprint together were given the same finishing time as Farrar, but five riders were injured, most notably Silence-Lotto's Gorik Gardeyn, who was taken to a hospital with four or five broken ribs, and a double fracture of his right shoulder blade. Française des Jeux's Yoann Offredo sustained a left shoulder injury. Maxime Vantomme, Sebastien Turgot, and Koen de Kort also sought medical attention, but their injuries weren't considered serious enough for them to have to leave the race.

Stage 1 Result

	Cyclist	Team	Time
1	Tyler Farrar (USA)	Garmin–Slipstream	4h 18' 40"
2	Tom Boonen (BEL)	Quick-Step	s.t.
3	Edvald Boasson Hagen (NOR)	Team Columbia–HTC	s.t.
4	Graeme Brown (AUS)	Rabobank	s.t.
5	Robert Förster (GER)	Team Milram	s.t.
6	Yauheni Hutarovich (BLR)	Française des Jeux	s.t.
7	Tom Veelers (NED)	Skil–Shimano	s.t.
8	Roy Sentjens (BEL)	Silence–Lotto	s.t.
9	Mathew Hayman (AUS)	Rabobank	s.t.
10	Juan José Haedo (ARG)	Team Saxo Bank	s.t.

General Classification after Stage 1

	Cyclist	Team	Time
1	Tyler Farrar (USA)	Garmin–Slipstream	4h 23' 26"
2	Tom Boonen (BEL)	Quick-Step	+ 4"
3	Sylvain Chavanel (FRA)	Quick-Step	+ 9"
4	Edvald Boasson Hagen (NOR)	Team Columbia–HTC	+ 10"
5	Bradley Wiggins (GBR)	Garmin–Slipstream	+ 11"
6	Joost Posthuma (NED)	Rabobank	+ 11"
7	Vincenzo Nibali (ITA)	Liquigas–Doimo	+ 13"
8	Juan Antonio Flecha (ESP)	Rabobank	+ 13"
9	Maarten Tjallingii (NED)	Rabobank	+ 14"
10	Nikolas Maes (BEL)	Topsport Vlaanderen–Mercator	+ 14"

=== Stage 2 ===
20 August 2009 - Ardooie (Belgium) to Brussels (Belgium), 178.1 km

This stage is undulating, with numerous small raises in elevation, including the Muur van Geraardsbergen, used yearly in the Tour of Flanders.

The heat combined with the many small climbs caused many riders to drop out of the race. A notable rider to abandon was Astana's Andreas Klöden due to injuring his wrist after crashing going around a roundabout. A 5-man breakaway formed after 18 km, comprising Juan José Haedo, Mathew Hayman, Tanel Kangert, Jérémy Roy, and David Deroo. Their maximum advantage was just under two minutes, and they began to splinter 76 km from the finish. By that point, the leading peloton in pursuit of the breakaway was only about 80 riders strong. Several riders from that leading peloton tried to counterattack as the morning's breakaway was caught, and a group including Edvald Boasson Hagen was able to get away briefly. As Boasson Hagen began the stage fourth overall, the contenders weren't willing to let him get very far up the road, and limited the advantage of this breakaway to just 48 seconds before it was caught. Numerous other breakaways saw riders briefly get away, and Nick Nuyens had a gap of 20 seconds inside the final kilometer, but a mass sprint finish still took place. The sprint was won by race leader Tyler Farrar, who extended his overall lead, though he expressed doubt in his ability to hold it when asked after the stage.

Stage 2 Result

	Cyclist	Team	Time
1	Tyler Farrar (USA)	Garmin–Slipstream	4h 17' 53"
2	Yauheni Hutarovich (BLR)	Française des Jeux	s.t.
3	Edvald Boasson Hagen (NOR)	Team Columbia–HTC	s.t.
4	Graeme Brown (AUS)	Rabobank	s.t.
5	Tom Veelers (NED)	Skil–Shimano	s.t.
6	Francesco Gavazzi (ITA)	Lampre–NGC	s.t.
7	Baden Cooke (AUS)	Vacansoleil	s.t.
8	Alexandre Usov (BLR)	Cofidis	s.t.
9	Jose Joaquin Rojas Gil (ESP)	Caisse d'Epargne	s.t.
10	Tom Boonen (BEL)	Quick-Step	s.t.

General Classification after Stage 2

	Cyclist	Team	Time
1	Tyler Farrar (USA)	Garmin–Slipstream	8h 41' 09"
2	Edvald Boasson Hagen (NOR)	Team Columbia–HTC	+ 13"
3	Tom Boonen (BEL)	Quick-Step	+ 14"
4	Sylvain Chavanel (FRA)	Quick-Step	+ 19"
5	Bradley Wiggins (GBR)	Garmin–Slipstream	+ 21"
6	Joost Posthuma (NED)	Rabobank	+ 21"
7	Vincenzo Nibali (ITA)	Liquigas–Doimo	+ 23"
8	Juan Antonio Flecha (ESP)	Rabobank	+ 23"
9	Maarten Tjallingii (NED)	Rabobank	+ 24"
10	Nikolas Maes (BEL)	Topsport Vlaanderen–Mercator	+ 24"

=== Stage 3 ===
21 August 2009 - Niel (Belgium) to Hasselt (Belgium), 158.3 km

This course is similar in profile to the one previous, bumpy but without any imposing rises in elevation.

A breakaway formed 39 km into this stage, with Romain Villa, Niki Terpstra, and Albert Timmer the escapees. Their maximum advantage was about three minutes before the Quick Step and Garmin Slipstream-led peloton set to reeling them in. Timmer and Terpstra eventually dropped Villa after repeated attacks and counterattacks, but the peloton was all one with 6 km left to ride. Liquigas–Doimo was the first team to try to deploy their leadout train, working for Francesco Chicchi, but they were quickly overwhelmed by Garmin, Quick Step, and Team Columbia-HTC. Edvald Boasson Hagen attacked within the final kilometer, on the last turn before the finish, but the mass sprint took him back in. The first across the line was Belgian national champion Tom Boonen, gaining his first victory with that jersey on his shoulders.

Stage 3 Result

	Cyclist	Team	Time
1	Tom Boonen (BEL)	Quick-Step	3h 43' 19"
2	Tyler Farrar (USA)	Garmin–Slipstream	s.t.
3	Francesco Chicchi (ITA)	Liquigas–Doimo	s.t.
4	José Joaquín Rojas (ESP)	Caisse d'Epargne	s.t.
5	Alexei Markov (RUS)	Team Katusha	s.t.
6	Matthew Goss (AUS)	Team Saxo Bank	s.t.
7	Mark Renshaw (AUS)	Team Columbia–HTC	s.t.
8	Baden Cooke (AUS)	Vacansoleil	s.t.
9	Robert Wagner (GER)	Skil–Shimano	s.t.
10	Alexandre Usov (BLR)	Cofidis	s.t.

General Classification after Stage 3

	Cyclist	Team	Time
1	Tyler Farrar (USA)	Garmin–Slipstream	12h 24' 22"
2	Tom Boonen (BEL)	Quick-Step	+ 10"
3	Edvald Boasson Hagen (NOR)	Team Columbia–HTC	+ 19"
4	Sylvain Chavanel (FRA)	Quick-Step	+ 25"
5	Bradley Wiggins (GBR)	Garmin–Slipstream	+ 27"
6	Joost Posthuma (NED)	Rabobank	+ 27"
7	Vincenzo Nibali (ITA)	Liquigas–Doimo	+ 29"
8	Juan Antonio Flecha (ESP)	Rabobank	+ 29"
9	Maarten Tjallingii (NED)	Rabobank	+ 30"
10	Nikolas Maes (BEL)	Topsport Vlaanderen–Mercator	+ 30"

=== Stage 4 ===
22 August 2009 - Hasselt (Belgium) to Libramont (Belgium), 221.2 km

This is the Eneco Tour's longest stage, and it is the only one with any real heights to speak of. It begins at a higher point than is previously reached in the Tour and climbs in several places, including a slight uphill to the finish.

This stage began very quickly, with the first hour of racing covering almost 50 km. At the 60 km mark, Damien Gaudin broke away and was the lone leader for a time before being joined by Reinier Honig and Niki Terpstra. Their maximum advantage over the peloton came at the 90 km mark, an advantage of 7' 45". Garmin-Slipstream and Rabobank drove the peloton to catch the breakaway, and they easily did, with over 50 km left to race. Several further breakaways were attempted, and the pace needed to bring them back combined with the stage's hilly terrain made it so the leading group was for a time only about 30 riders strong. Top contenders Bradley Wiggins, Vincenzo Nibali, and Sylvain Chavanel, among with many others, all tried to break away after the morning's initial escapees were caught, but none ultimately succeeded. A group of 79 was together for a surprising mass sprint finish. Though this was thought to be the first stage that would not end in a field sprint, race leader Tyler Farrar and other sprint specialists like fellow stage winner Tom Boonen never lost contact with the leading peloton. It was initially thought that Edvald Boasson Hagen had won the sprint, but close examination of the photo finish showed that Farrar in fact was the first across the line, for his third stage win of the Tour.

Stage 4 Result

	Cyclist	Team	Time
1	Tyler Farrar (USA)	Garmin–Slipstream	5h 27' 01"
2	Edvald Boasson Hagen (NOR)	Team Columbia–HTC	s.t.
3	Francesco Gavazzi (ITA)	Lampre–NGC	s.t.
4	Greg Van Avermaet (BEL)	Silence–Lotto	s.t.
5	Kristof Goddaert (BEL)	Topsport Vlaanderen–Mercator	s.t.
6	José Joaquín Rojas (ESP)	Caisse d'Epargne	s.t.
7	Aitor Galdos (ESP)	Euskaltel–Euskadi	s.t.
8	Roy Sentjens (BEL)	Silence–Lotto	s.t.
9	Alexandre Usov (BLR)	Cofidis	s.t.
10	Lars Bak (DEN)	Team Saxo Bank	s.t.

General Classification after Stage 4

	Cyclist	Team	Time
1	Tyler Farrar (USA)	Garmin–Slipstream	17h 51' 13"
2	Tom Boonen (BEL)	Quick-Step	+ 20"
3	Edvald Boasson Hagen (NOR)	Team Columbia–HTC	+ 23"
4	Sylvain Chavanel (FRA)	Quick-Step	+ 35"
5	Maarten Tjallingii (NED)	Rabobank	+ 37"
6	Vincenzo Nibali (ITA)	Liquigas–Doimo	+ 37"
7	Bradley Wiggins (GBR)	Garmin–Slipstream	+ 37"
8	Joost Posthuma (NED)	Rabobank	+ 37"
9	Juan Antonio Flecha (ESP)	Rabobank	+ 39"
10	Nikolas Maes (BEL)	Topsport Vlaanderen–Mercator	+ 40"

=== Stage 5 ===
23 August 2009 - Roermond (Netherlands) to Sittard (Netherlands), 204.3 km

This course is jagged, beginning at near sea level but including a number of rises, with gradients reaching as high as 7.3%. The final 25 km to the finish are either flat or on rises of less than 4% gradient. It is thought of as the Tour's most difficult stage, and it has been called a "little Amstel Gold Race."

Two kilometers into the stage, three riders broke clear of the main field. These were Sergio De Lis, David Deroo, and Jens Mouris, and they obtained a maximum advantage of close to 18 minutes, at the 75 km mark. By the 105 km mark, it had fallen all the way to 10 minutes, as the peloton began their chase in earnest and the terrain became difficult for the escapees. A 15-man chase broke clear of the peloton 20 km later, headed by Columbia-HTC, Rabobank, and some other overall contenders. Race leader Tyler Farrar and teammate Bradley Wiggins, who had been thought to be a contender for the race overall, were not in the chase and neither were any of their teammates. Wiggins would end up finishing the stage 10'21" behind the stage winner and dropping well away from contention.

The leading groups continued to attack one another and splinter, and by 48 km to go, the original three breakaway riders were brought back into the fold. Thirteen riders were together for the final 20 km circuit in Sittard, and though their advantage continually fell as they neared the line, they finished with a 31-second advantage over the main chase group, that included Farrar. The decisive attack for the stage win came with about 1 km to go. Lars Bak sprinted out of the leading group and went à bloc to survive to the line, saying later that he felt faint for a while after the stage win. Edvald Boasson Hagen assumed the race overall leadership, by 15 seconds over Farrar and Bak.

Stage 5 Result

	Cyclist	Team	Time
1	Lars Bak (DEN)	Team Saxo Bank	5h 13' 16"
2	Edvald Boasson Hagen (NOR)	Team Columbia–HTC	+ 2"
3	Francesco Gavazzi (ITA)	Lampre–NGC	s.t.
4	Greg Van Avermaet (BEL)	Silence–Lotto	s.t.
5	Juan Antonio Flecha (ESP)	Rabobank	s.t.
6	Sebastian Langeveld (NED)	Rabobank	s.t.
7	Joost Posthuma (NED)	Rabobank	s.t.
8	Jan Bakelants (BEL)	Topsport Vlaanderen–Mercator	s.t.
9	David Deroo (FRA)	Skil–Shimano	s.t.
10	Jurgen Van Goolen (BEL)	Team Saxo Bank	s.t.

General Classification after Stage 5

	Cyclist	Team	Time
1	Edvald Boasson Hagen (NOR)	Team Columbia–HTC	23h 04' 55"
2	Tyler Farrar (USA)	Garmin–Slipstream	+ 15"
3	Lars Bak (DEN)	Team Saxo Bank	+ 15"
4	Sylvain Chavanel (FRA)	Quick-Step	+ 21"
5	Vincenzo Nibali (ITA)	Liquigas–Doimo	+ 23"
6	Joost Posthuma (NED)	Rabobank	+ 23"
7	Juan Antonio Flecha (ESP)	Rabobank	+ 25"
8	Francesco Gavazzi (ITA)	Lampre–NGC	+ 28"
9	Jan Bakelants (BEL)	Topsport Vlaanderen–Mercator	+ 28"
10	Maxime Monfort (BEL)	Team Columbia–HTC	+ 29"

=== Stage 6 ===
24 August 2009 - Genk (Belgium) to Roermond (Netherlands), 163.3 km

This stage was flat. Vincenzo Nibali, who had been in fifth overall and was considered an important rider for Italy at the world championships, did not start this stage due to a season-ending broken collarbone sustained the previous day.

This was a very straightforward day of racing. A three-man breakaway, comprising Rick Flens, Huub Duyn, and Alexander Serov, came clear after 34 km. The peloton kept their advantage under tight control, as it did not extend beyond 90 seconds at any point. The catch easily occurred at the 12 km to go mark. The two Italian teams, Lampre–NGC and Liquigas–Doimo, drove the peloton in the stage's final kilometers, to try to weaken the field to the advantage of their sprinters. Team Columbia-HTC came forward inside the final kilometer and race leader Edvald Boasson Hagen jumped from an early leadout, just after a right-hand turn in the road, to sprint away to the stage win. Tyler Farrar had been caught off guard, and could not make up the ground to Boasson Hagen, finishing third as the young Norwegian took the stage win. Boasson Hagen, like Farrar before him, expressed his doubts after the stage that he could hold on for the overall win.

Stage 6 Result

	Cyclist	Team	Time
1	Edvald Boasson Hagen (NOR)	Team Columbia–HTC	3h 28' 58"
2	Matthew Goss (AUS)	Team Saxo Bank	s.t.
3	Tyler Farrar (USA)	Garmin–Slipstream	s.t.
4	Graeme Brown (AUS)	Rabobank	s.t.
5	Francesco Chicchi (ITA)	Liquigas–Doimo	s.t.
6	Mark Renshaw (AUS)	Team Columbia–HTC	s.t.
7	Baden Cooke (AUS)	Vacansoleil	s.t.
8	Kristof Goddaert (BEL)	Topsport Vlaanderen–Mercator	s.t.
9	Angelo Furlan (ITA)	Lampre–NGC	s.t.
10	Klaas Lodewyck (BEL)	Topsport Vlaanderen–Mercator	s.t.

General Classification after Stage 6

	Cyclist	Team	Time
1	Edvald Boasson Hagen (NOR)	Team Columbia–HTC	26h 33' 33"
2	Tyler Farrar (USA)	Garmin–Slipstream	+ 21"
3	Lars Bak (DEN)	Team Saxo Bank	+ 25"
4	Sylvain Chavanel (FRA)	Quick-Step	+ 31"
5	Joost Posthuma (NED)	Rabobank	+ 33"
6	Juan Antonio Flecha (ESP)	Rabobank	+ 35"
7	Francesco Gavazzi (ITA)	Lampre–NGC	+ 38"
8	Jan Bakelants (BEL)	Topsport Vlaanderen–Mercator	+ 38"
9	Maxime Monfort (BEL)	Team Columbia–HTC	+ 39"
10	Jurgen Van den Broeck (BEL)	Silence–Lotto	+ 42"

=== Stage 7 ===
25 August 2009 - Amersfoort (Netherlands), 13.1 km (ITT)

The course for the second time trial is more challenging and technical than the first. There are several sharp turns and curves in the road, and only one long straightaway.

The early best time was set by Saxo Bank rider Alex Rasmussen. An hour after Rasmussen's ride, Tony Martin and Thomas De Gendt both bettered his time by a few seconds, as rain began to fall. Bradley Wiggins, who had fallen well out of contention on Stage 5 but would figure to be a favorite in any time trial, had the best time at the intermediate time check. He did not, however, finish the course, opting instead to simply pull off shortly after the 5.9 km mark, as the rain continued to fall. The rain caused Joost Posthuma to spin out and crash after a right-hand turn, costing him such time that he fell from fifth on GC all the way to 11th after the stage. Race leader Edvald Boasson Hagen was the last man to take the course and managed to just beat the times set by the Rabobank duo of Sebastian Langeveld and Maarten Tjallingii set shortly before his run to win the stage. Tyler Farrar, who had been in second overall, decided to skip this time trial in order to better concentrate on the Vuelta a España. The win sealed the first-ever stage race victory for Boasson Hagen.

Stage 7 Result

	Cyclist	Team	Time
1	Edvald Boasson Hagen (NOR)	Team Columbia–HTC	16' 07"
2	Sebastian Langeveld (NED)	Rabobank	+ 4"
3	Maarten Tjallingii (NED)	Rabobank	+ 5"
4	Sylvain Chavanel (FRA)	Quick-Step	+ 14"
5	Jurgen Van den Broeck (BEL)	Silence–Lotto	+ 16"
6	Maxime Monfort (BEL)	Team Columbia–HTC	+ 19"
7	Andrey Amador (CRC)	Caisse d'Epargne	+ 20"
8	Juan Antonio Flecha (ESP)	Rabobank	+ 23"
9	Thomas De Gendt (BEL)	Topsport Vlaanderen–Mercator	+ 25"
10	László Bodrogi (FRA)	Team Katusha	+ 27"

Final General Classification

	Cyclist	Team	Time
1	Edvald Boasson Hagen (NOR)	Team Columbia–HTC	26h 49' 40"
2	Sylvain Chavanel (FRA)	Quick-Step	+ 45"
3	Sebastian Langeveld (NED)	Rabobank	+ 47"
4	Jurgen Van den Broeck (BEL)	Silence–Lotto	+ 58"
5	Maxime Monfort (BEL)	Team Columbia–HTC	+ 58"
6	Juan Antonio Flecha (ESP)	Rabobank	+ 58"
7	Lars Bak (DEN)	Team Saxo Bank	+ 58"
8	Maarten Tjallingii (NED)	Rabobank	+ 1' 06"
9	Jan Bakelants (BEL)	Topsport Vlaanderen–Mercator	+ 1' 12"
10	Francesco Chicchi (ITA)	Liquigas–Doimo	+ 1' 22"
