= De Roo =

De Roo is a Dutch surname meaning "the red (haired) one" (de rode in modern Dutch). It is often concatenated to DeRoo in French and West Flanders.

People with this surname include:

De Roo

- Alain De Roo (born 1955), Belgian racing cyclist
- Alexander de Roo (born 1955), Dutch politician
- Benjamin de Roo (1940–2016), Dutch-born Australian gymnast
- Carolus Josephus de Roo (1793–1880), Belgian nobility, politician, and magistrate
- Jo de Roo (born 1937), Dutch road racing cyclist
- Joseph De Roo (1932–2001), Belgian translator of Japanese
- Peter de Roo (born 1970), Dutch footballer
- Remi De Roo (1924–2022), Canadian Roman Catholic bishop
- Sara De Roo (born 1970), Belgian actress

DeRoo

- Antoon Emeric Marcel De Roo (1936–1971), Belgian naturalist after whom Deroo's mouse was named.
- Dave DeRoo (born 1974), American rock bassist
- David Deroo (born 1985), French road racing cyclist
- Sam Deroo (born 1992), Belgian volleyball player

== See also ==
- De Roo van Alderwerelt, Dutch patrician family
- De Rooij, surname of the same origin
- Roe (surname), with English and Scottish variants Roe or Roo (south), and Rae or Ray (north), meaning "a female deer"
