= Edvald Boasson Hagen =

Norwegian road racing cyclist

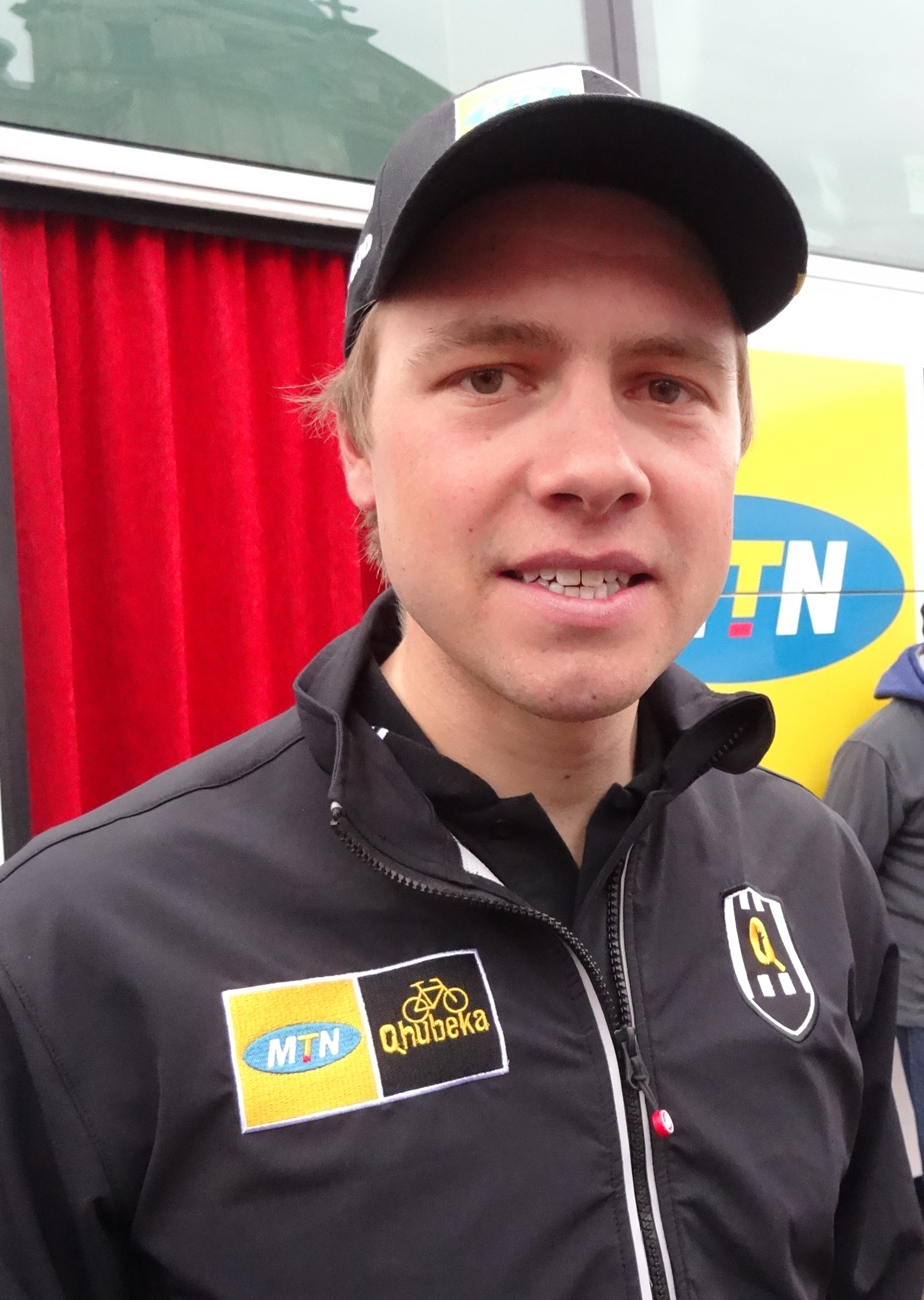
- Boasson Hagen at the 2015 Omloop Het Nieuwsblad

Personal information
- Full name: Edvald Boasson Hagen
- Nickname: Eddy the Boss
- Born: 17 May 1987 (age 39) Rudsbygd, Lillehammer, Norway
- Height: 1.81 m (5 ft 11 1/2 in)
- Weight: 73 kg (161 lb; 11 st 7 lb)

Cycling career
- Sport: Cycling
- Discipline: Road
- Role: Rider
- Rider type: Rouleur; Sprinter

Professional teams
- 2006–2007: Maxbo–Bianchi
- 2008–2009: Team High Road
- 2010–2014: Team Sky
- 2015–2020: MTN–Qhubeka
- 2021–2023: Total Direct Énergie
- 2024: Decathlon–AG2R La Mondiale

Major wins
- Grand Tours Tour de France 3 individual stages (2011, 2017) Giro d'Italia 1 individual stage (2009) Stage races Eneco Tour (2009, 2011) Tour of Britain (2009, 2015) Tour of Norway (2012, 2013, 2017) Tour des Fjords (2017) One-day races and Classics National Road Race Championships (2012, 2015, 2016) National Time Trial Championships (2007–2011, 2013, 2015–2018) Gent–Wevelgem (2009) Vattenfall Cyclassics (2011) GP Ouest-France (2012)
Medal record
Representing Norway
Men's road bicycle racing
World Championships
Silver medal – second place	2012 Valkenburg	Road race
Representing Team Sky
World Championships
Bronze medal – third place	2013 Tuscany	Team time trial

Edvald Boasson Hagen (born 17 May 1987) is a Norwegian former road racing cyclist, who competed as a professional from 2006 to 2024. He was ranked as no. 3 in the world by UCI as of 31 August 2009, when he was 22 years old. He is known as an all-rounder, having won the Norwegian National Road Race Championships in 2012, 2015 and 2016. He is also a ten-time winner of the Norwegian National Time Trial Championships.

After retiring as a professional cyclist he became an architectural drafter.

== Professional career ==
=== Maxbo–Bianchi (2006–2007) ===
Boasson Hagen joined the Norwegian continental team Maxbo–Bianchi in 2006 and in his first season in the continental circuits he took eight wins including three stages of the Tour de l'Avenir.

In 2007 he enjoyed a successful season and scored fifteen wins, ending up second in number of victories behind ProTour sprinter Alessandro Petacchi. But, after the disqualification of the Italian in May 2008 for doping, Alessandro Petacchi lost 5 stage wins in the 2007 Giro resulting in Boasson Hagen having the most victories. Boasson Hagen won the overall classification as well as stages at Paris–Corrèze, Ringerike GP and Istrian Spring Trophy. He also took stages at Tour of Ireland, Tour de Normandie and Tour de Bretagne as well as the Norwegian time trial championship. As a result of these achievements, he finished fifth in the individual point standings of 2006-2007 UCI Europe Tour. In early 2007 it was announced that for 2008 season he would leave Team Maxbo Bianchi for the German UCI ProTeam T-Mobile Team. In late 2007 it was announced that Deutsche Telekom was to end sponsorship of T-Mobile Team with immediate effect. The team continued under the name Team High Road.

=== Team High Road (2008–2009) ===
==== 2008 ====
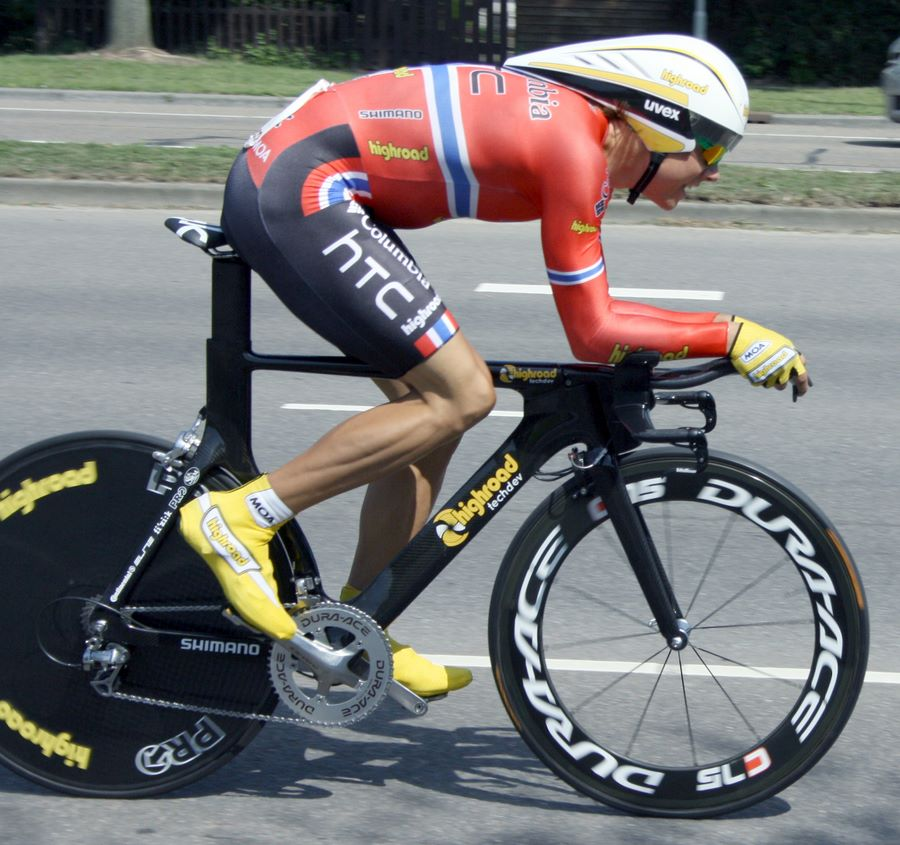
Boasson Hagen during the prologue of the 2009 Eneco Tour, in the Norwegian National Time Trial Champion jersey

Boasson Hagen began the 2008 season with a fifth place in the prologue of Tour of California, ahead of established time trial specialists like David Millar and Gustav Larsson. He later won the concluding individual time trial of Critérium International ahead of teammate Tony Martin and the Grand Prix de Denain. He also finished second at the Commerce Bank Reading Classic and became the Norway National Time Trial Champion for the second year in a row. Later in the year he competed in the Beijing Olympics Road Race, finishing 71st, and entered the ProTour race Eneco Tour aiming for the overall classification. He finished third in the prologue and was well placed in the following stages when in the fifth stage the front of the peloton split in the strong crosswinds and left him 14 minutes behind the leaders. Boasson Hagen lost any chance of overall victory but made up by winning the following stage in Brussels by passing Jimmy Engoulvent in the final fifteen meters of the race. At the Tour of Britain he won three stages and the points competition.

==== 2009 ====
In 2009, he won the cobbled classic Gent–Wevelgem in a two-man sprint against Liquigas rider Aleksandr Kuschynski. He also rode in the Giro d'Italia, his first ever Grand Tour, where Team Columbia won the Team Time trial, Boasson Hagen won the seventh stage in a sprint and finished second in the sixth and eighth stages. In the Tour de Pologne he won the fourth and sixth stages to finish third overall, and secure Norway ten riders in the upcoming UCI Road World Championships. Hagen also won his first stage race in 2009, the Eneco Tour, confirming his huge talent, and rising to third overall in the world ranking in August. Later in 2009 Boasson Hagen finished his season by winning four of the eight stages in the Tour of Britain, and winning the race overall. After months of rumours, it was official on 10 September 2009 that Boasson Hagen would be joining Team Sky from the 2010 season, along with fellow Norwegians Lars Petter Nordhaug and Kurt Asle Arvesen.

=== Team Sky (2010–2014) ===
==== 2010 ====
Boasson Hagen started his first race with Team Sky in the Tour of Qatar. After an impressive effort and stage win in the opening team time trial, Boasson Hagen secured 3rd and 6th-place finishes as his best results. In the Tour of Oman one week after the race in Qatar, Boasson Hagen won two stages, including the final stage in which he beat world time trial champion Fabian Cancellara by seventeen seconds in the individual time trial. With this win Boasson Hagen claimed second place in the overall classification, taking the young riders jersey and winning the overall points classification. Boasson Hagen won the seventh stage of the Critérium du Dauphiné. He also retained his national time trial title.

==== 2011 ====
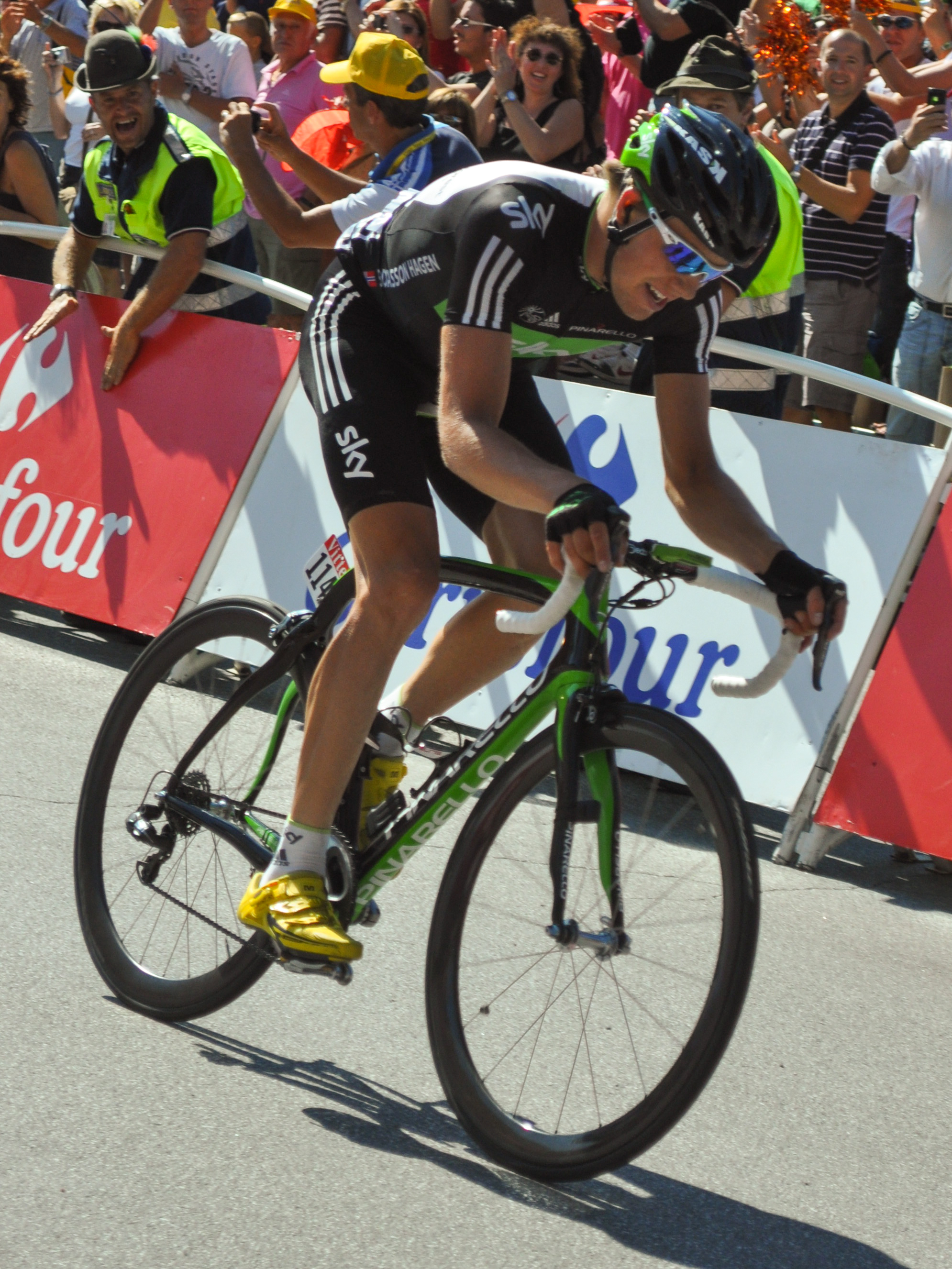
Boasson Hagen at the 2011 Tour de France; he won two stages during the race.

In 2011, Boasson Hagen again finished second in the Tour of Oman, also winning the points jersey for the second year running. Boasson Hagen won the 1st stage of Bayern Rundfahrt, and went on to win the points jersey, as well as helping team-mate Geraint Thomas win to first overall in the event. He won the Norwegian National Time Trial Championships for the fifth year running in June, but then contracted an illness that put his Tour de France in doubt.

He did recover though, and was given the go-ahead to ride the Tour. He won stage six of the Tour, the first ever victory by a British-registered professional cycling team in the Tour de France. Boasson Hagen finished second to compatriot Thor Hushovd on stage sixteen after the pair were in a three-man breakaway with Ryder Hesjedal. The next day he was again in a breakaway, and broke clear on the final climb of the day to take his second stage win of the Tour. Boasson Hagen finished second to Mark Cavendish on the final stage on the Champs Elysees. In August, Boasson Hagen took a clean sweep of the jerseys at the Eneco Tour, winning the event overall, as well as the points and young riders competitions, and finishing first on the final stage.

==== 2012 ====
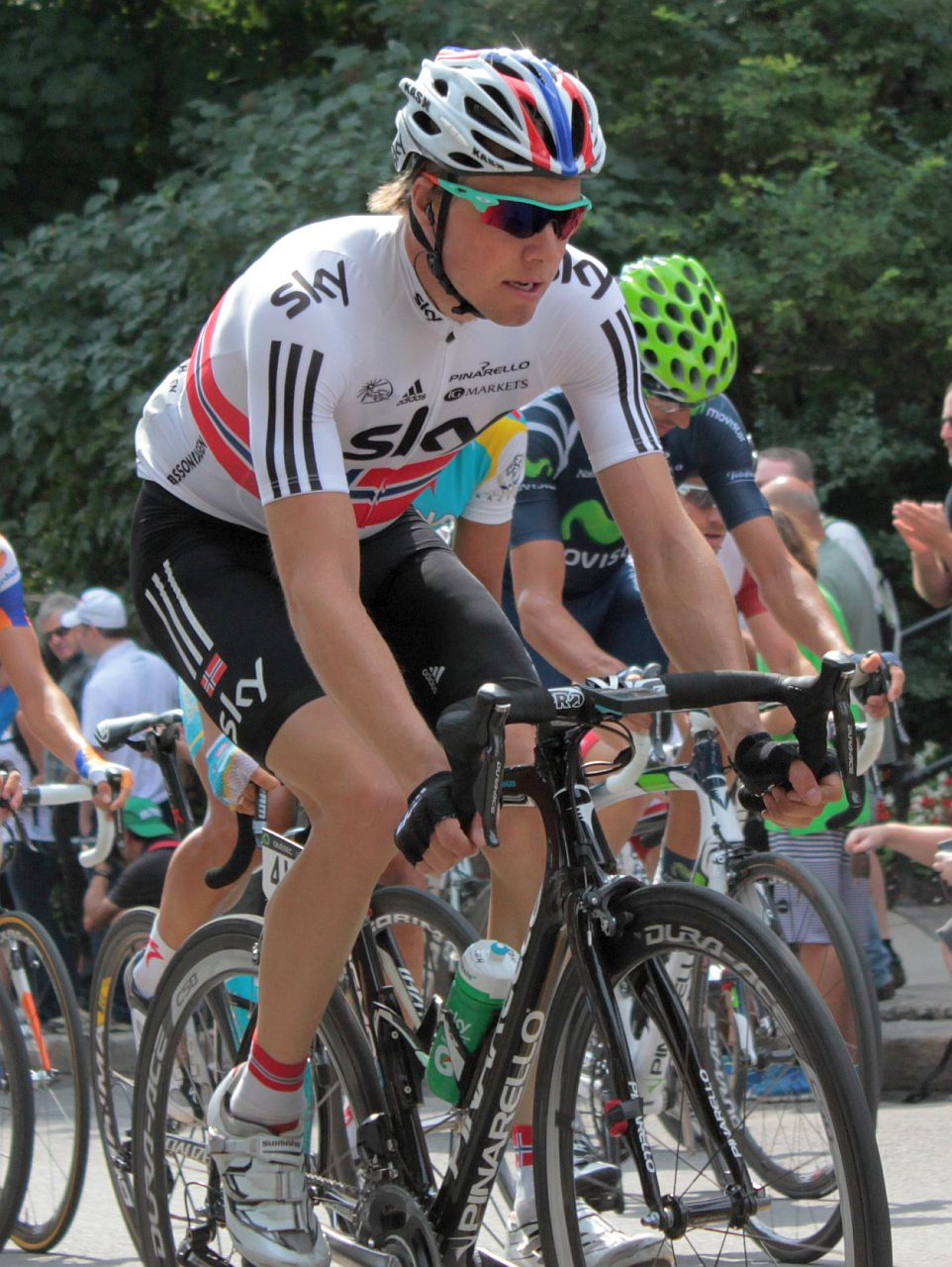
Boasson Hagen at the 2012 Grand Prix Cycliste de Québec

Boasson Hagen began the 2012 season with a second place to André Greipel in the Down Under Classic. After three top-five placings in stage finishes, he took the lead of the sprints classification after the fourth stage of the Tour Down Under and held the jersey until the end of the race. Boasson Hagen took the lead of the Volta ao Algarve after winning the second stage with a well-timed uphill sprint. He lost the race lead to team-mate Richie Porte on the next stage, after setting Porte up on the final climb, but he won the points jersey. He also won a stage of Tirreno–Adriatico, and acted as lead out man for Mark Cavendish. Boasson Hagen had a disappointing classics campaign, failing to post any major results. He did return to form at his home race, the Tour of Norway, winning the race overall, the points and young rider jerseys, and stage four which finished in his home town, Lillehammer.

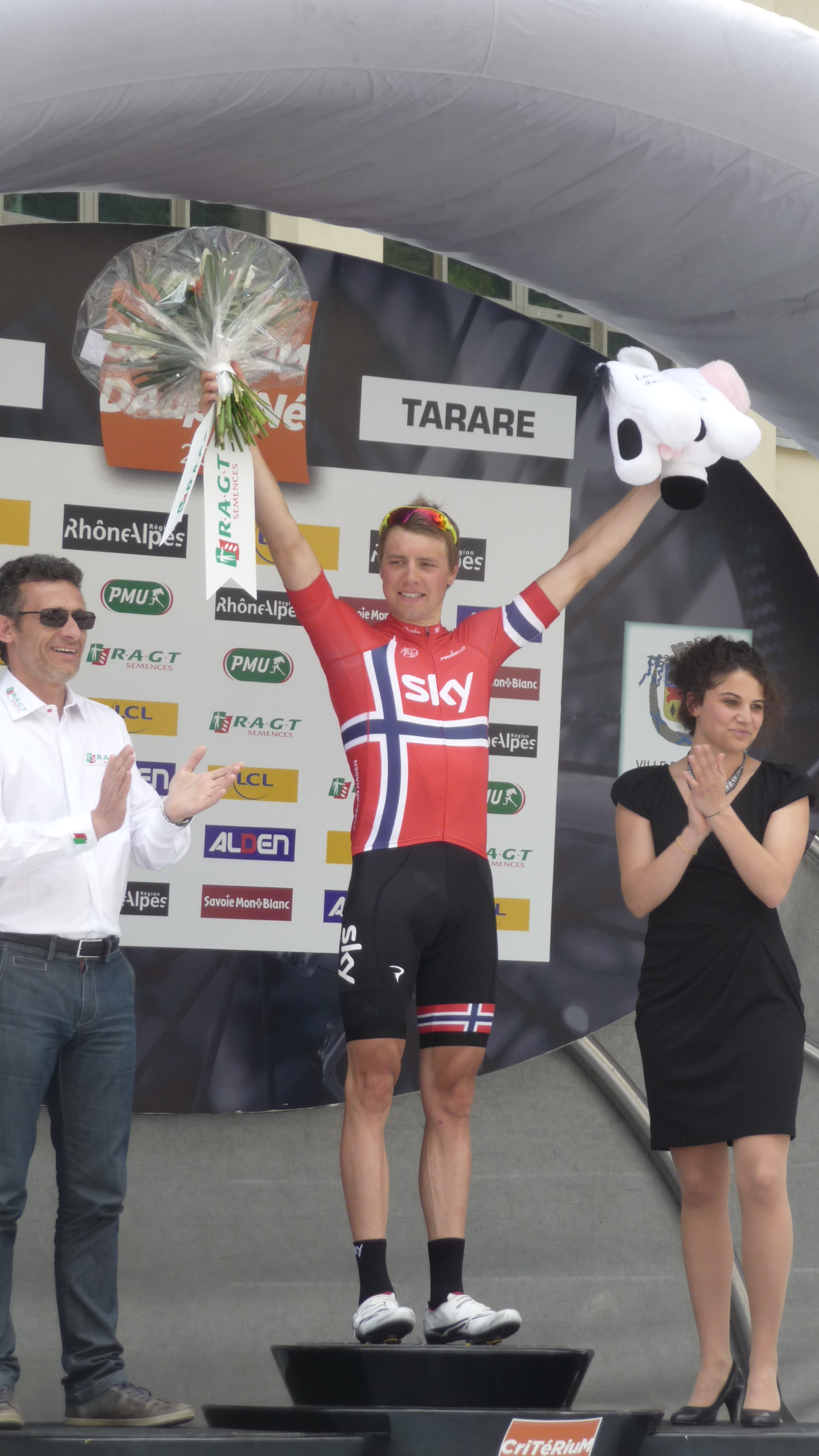
Boasson Hagen after winning stage 3 of the 2013 Criterium du Dauphine

In June 2012, Boasson Hagen won the Norwegian National Road Race Championships to take the national jersey for the first time; he did however lose his time trial national championship jersey to Joker–Merida's Reidar Borgersen. Boasson Hagen was selected in the Sky squad for the Tour de France. He finished fifth in the opening prologue in Liège, then took third on stage one, after bridging across to Peter Sagan and Cancellara in the closing stages, but being unable to beat them both in the sprint. He also finished second to Sagan on stage three, another hilltop finish. At the end of August, Boasson Hagen took the victory in the one day World Tour race the GP Ouest-France. He broke away from the bunch with a little more than two kilometers to go, caught and dropped the remaining man in front, Rui Costa (Movistar Team) on the last uphill section and descended to the finish solo. He denied the sprinters in the eighty-man chasing group a chance at victory by holding on to a five-second advantage.

==== 2013 ====
Boasson Hagen began the season with the stated ambition of winning one of the Spring classics, but failed to attain any notable results. However, Boasson Hagen returned to defend his title at the Glava Tour of Norway. After finishing as runner-up in two of the previous sprint stages, Boasson Hagen sparked a two-man breakaway with Sérgio Paulinho to win the fourth stage and consequently both the overall and points classifications. Boasson Hagen would follow this up with a sprint victory on stage three of the Critérium du Dauphiné. He was also named in the startlist for the Tour de France that year but on stage 12 he broke his collarbone in a huge crash ten kilometers from the finish line and was forced to abandon the race.

==== 2014 ====
2014 was Boasson Hagen's worst year of his career in the fact that he did not record a single stage win. On 14 August, Boasson Hagen announced that he would leave Team Sky at the end of the 2014 season. On 27 August, Boasson Hagen announced that he would join African UCI Professional Continental Team MTN–Qhubeka on a 2-year deal.

=== MTN–Qhubeka (2015–2020) ===
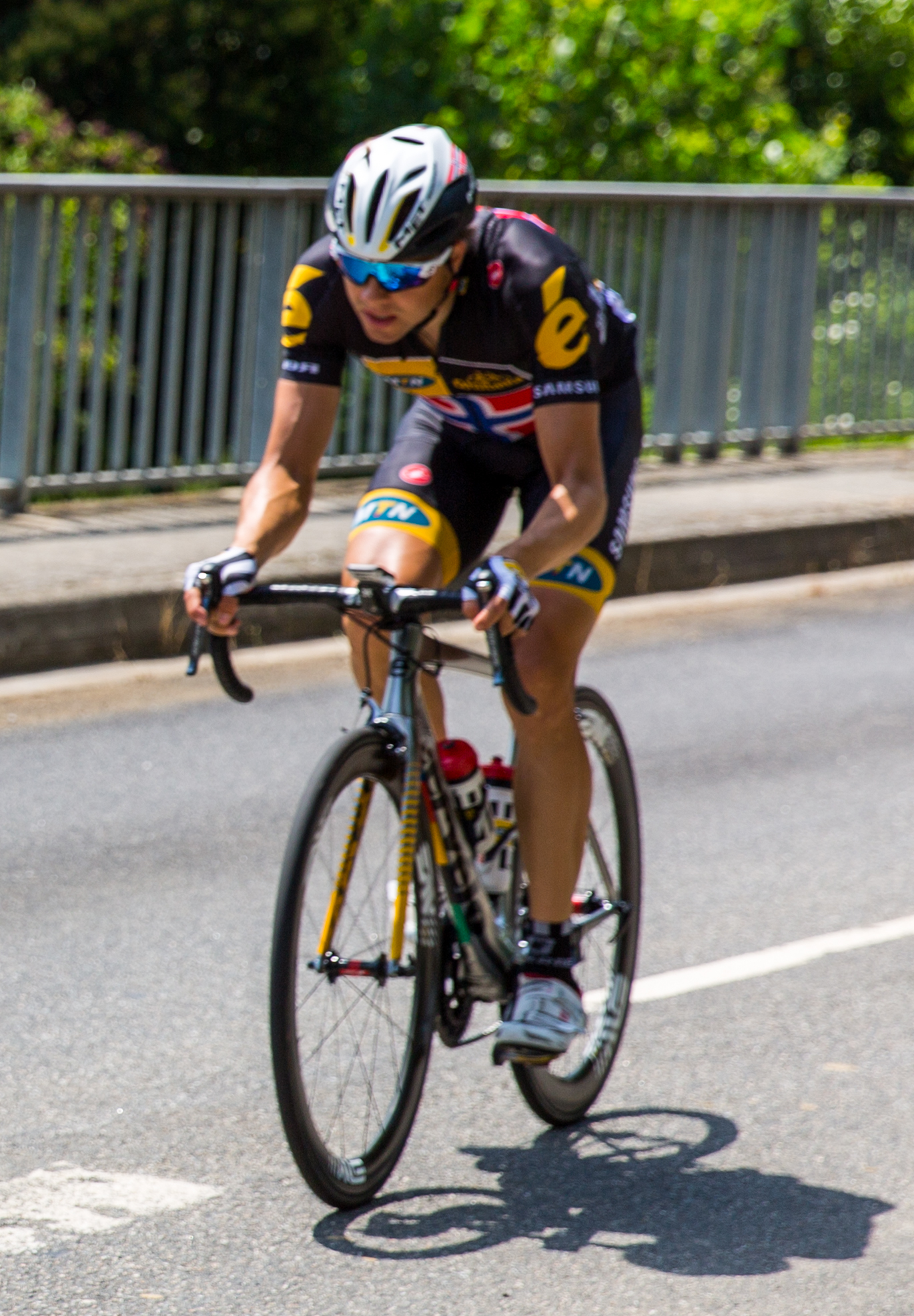
Boasson Hagen at the 2015 Tour de France.

==== 2015 ====
After finishing second overall of the Tour of Norway, Boasson Hagen picked up his first win in two years at the Tour des Fjords, on the last stage of the race. He outsprinted a small leading group of four riders to accomplish the feat. In June, Boasson Hagen won the Norwegian National Time Trial Championships and the Norwegian National Road Race Championships after jumping from the chasing group to join the lead group in the final kilometer. He won the title in a close sprint. In the final kilometers of the UCI Road World Championships, Boasson Hagen refused to cooperate with Greg van Avermaet to close the 10-second gap to later winner Peter Sagan. The most likely reason for Boasson Hagen not to put an effort in the chase was his fellow countryman and sprinter Alexander Kristoff who was in the main peloton just seconds behind the duo. Boasson Hagen eventually finished 20th, just 3 seconds behind the winner.

==== 2016 ====
Boasson Hagen enjoyed a return to form in the early part of the 2016 campaign; taking three stage victories at the Tour of Qatar and Tour of Oman, holding race leader jerseys in both races. He then ended up 5th in Paris-Roubaix after being a part of a five-man group that sprinted for the victory. Late in the season, Boasson Hagen finished 6th at the UCI World Road Championships held in Doha, Qatar, while teammate Alexander Kristoff placed 7th. After the race, Kristoff expressed frustration with Boasson Hagen and the Norwegian team's sprint. Boasson Hagen's result was the highest placing for a Norwegian rider at the event.

==== 2017 ====
Boasson Hagen soloed to victory on stage 19 of the Tour de France, successfully attacking from the breakaway in the final few kilometres. Boasson Hagen, along with Nikias Arndt, took the right side of a roundabout with only 2.2 kilometers remaining, whilst the remainder of the breakaway took the left. The right side of this roundabout ended up being shorter than the left and thus created a gap for the two cyclists. Boasson Hagen was then able to drop Arndt from his wheel to take the victory. This victory marked Boasson Hagen's only triumph at the 2017 Tour de France despite finishing on the podium 5 other times, on stages 7, 11, 14, 16 and 21.

==== 2018 ====
In January Boasson Hagen had his gallbladder removed. He started his season with an appearance at the Volta ao Algarve. In 2018 Boasson Hagen was shut out of world tour victories, only winning on stage 2 of the Tour of Norway and the Norwegian National Championships in the Individual Time Trial event.

==== 2019 ====
In 2019, Boasson Hagen was the only rider on Team Dimension Data's roster to take a victory in a World Tour race, winning stage 1 of the Critérium du Dauphiné.

==== 2020 ====
Participating in his 10th Tour de France, Boasson Hagen only achieved one top 10 finish in the race, finishing 2nd on Stage 7. Boasson Hagen also made headlines in the Tour of Flanders by attacking from the peloton right before a train arrived at a level crossing, holding up the peloton and allowing Boasson Hagen to continue.

=== Total Direct Énergie (2021–2023) ===
==== 2021 ====
In November 2020, Boasson Hagen signed a one-year contract with Total Direct Énergie, for the 2021 season. He finished sixth at the Tour de Vendée, and took top-ten stage finishes at the Arctic Race of Norway and the Tour de Luxembourg. Boasson Hagen participated in his 11th Tour de France this year, finishing outside the time limit on Stage 15. He extended his contract with the team, renamed Team TotalEnergies earlier in 2021, by a further two years.

==== 2022 ====
At the 2022 Tour de France, Boasson Hagen formed part of a successful breakaway on the fifth stage, finishing third on the stage to move up to third place in the general classification. He ultimately finished 58th overall, his best overall Tour de France finish for a decade.

==== 2023 ====
By participating in the 2023 Tour de France, Boasson Hagen marked his 13th career start in the race. Boasson Hagen's contract was not extended beyond the end of the 2023 season by Team TotalEnergies.

=== Decathlon—AG2R La Mondiale (2024) ===
==== 2024 ====
In 2024 Boasson Hagen signed for Decathlon AG2R La Mondiale. Throughout the season he participated in several UCI World Tour races including the Critérium du Dauphiné, Tour de Pologne and Paris–Roubaix. At the end of the season Boasson Hagen retired from professional cycling.

== Major results ==
2004
National Junior Road Championships

1st Road race
2nd Time trial

1st Mountains classification, Grand Prix Général Patton
3rd Trofee der Vlaamse Ardennen
4th Ledegem–Kemmel–Ledegem
5th Overall Course de la Paix Juniors
2005
National Junior Road Championships

1st Road race
1st Time trial

1st Stage 2 Keizer der Juniores
2nd Overall Internationale Junioren-Rundfahrt Niedersachsen

1st Stage 1

2nd Overall Junior Tour of Wales
6th Time trial, UCI Junior World Championships
8th Overall Course de la Paix Juniors

1st Stage 3b

2006 (3 pro wins)
1st Scandinavian Open Road Race
Tour de l'Avenir

1st Stages 2, 5 & 7

National Road Championships

2nd Road race
4th Time trial

2nd GP Aarhus
3rd Overall Thüringen Rundfahrt der U23

1st Young rider classification
1st Stages 1 & 5

UCI Under-23 Road World Championships

5th Time trial
9th Road race

5th Overall Ringerike GP

1st Stage 3

8th Overall Rhône-Alpes Isère Tour

1st Points classification
1st Young rider classification
1st Stage 4

2007 (5)
1st Time trial, National Road Championships
1st Overall Istrian Spring Trophy

1st Prologue

1st Overall Paris–Corrèze

1st Points classification
1st Stages 1 & 2

1st Overall Ringerike GP

1st Young rider classification
1st Stages 1, 2, 3 & 5

1st Stage 4 Tour of Ireland
3rd Road race, National Under-23 Road Championships
6th Time trial, UCI Under-23 Road World Championships
6th Overall Tour de Bretagne

1st Stages 2 & 7

7th Overall Tour de Normandie

1st Stage 8

8th GP Herning
9th Colliers Classic
2008 (7)
National Road Championships

1st Time trial
4th Road race

1st Grand Prix de Denain
Tour of Britain

1st Sprints classification
1st Stages 4, 5 & 7

1st Stage 3 (ITT) Critérium International
1st Stage 6 Eneco Tour
2nd Reading Classic
5th Memorial Rik Van Steenbergen
2009 (13)
1st Time trial, National Road Championships
1st Overall Tour of Britain

1st Points classification
1st Stages 3, 4, 5 & 6

1st Overall Eneco Tour

1st Points classification
1st Stages 6 & 7 (ITT)

1st Gent–Wevelgem
Giro d'Italia

1st Stages 1 (TTT) & 7

1st Sandefjord GP
2nd Trofeo Sóller
2nd Trofeo Calvia
3rd Overall Tour de Pologne

1st Stages 4 & 6

4th Monte Paschi Strade Bianche
6th UCI World Ranking
8th Trofeo Pollença
2010 (6)
National Road Championships

1st Time trial
5th Road race

1st Dutch Food Valley Classic
1st Stage 1 (TTT) Tour of Qatar
1st Stage 7 Tirreno–Adriatico
1st Stage 7 Critérium du Dauphiné
1st Oslo GP
2nd Overall Tour of Oman

1st Points classification
1st Young rider classification
1st Stages 3 & 6 (ITT)

2nd Vattenfall Cyclassics
2nd Grand Prix Cycliste de Québec
2nd Chrono des Nations
3rd Overall Eneco Tour

1st Points classification

6th Omloop Het Nieuwsblad
2011 (7)
1st Time trial, National Road Championships
1st Overall Eneco Tour

1st Points classification
1st Young rider classification
1st Stage 6

1st Vattenfall Cyclassics
Tour de France

1st Stages 6 & 17

Bayern Rundfahrt

1st Points classification
1st Stage 1

1st Sandefjord GP
2nd Overall Tour of Oman

1st Points classification

8th Road race, UCI Road World Championships
8th Kuurne–Brussels–Kuurne
2012 (7)
National Road Championships

1st Road race
2nd Time trial

1st Overall Tour of Norway

1st Points classification
1st Young rider classification
1st Stage 4

1st GP Ouest-France
Volta ao Algarve

1st Points classification
1st Stage 2

1st Stage 3 Tirreno–Adriatico
1st Stage 3 Critérium du Dauphiné
2nd Road race, UCI Road World Championships
3rd Overall Tour of Beijing

1st Points classification

5th Trofeo Migjorn
5th Gent–Wevelgem
5th Vattenfall Cyclassics
5th Grand Prix Cycliste de Montréal
7th Overall Tour Down Under

1st Sprints classification

2013 (4)
National Road Championships

1st Time trial
3rd Road race

1st Overall Tour of Norway

1st Points classification
1st Stage 4

1st Stage 3 Critérium du Dauphiné
3rd Team time trial, UCI Road World Championships
5th Down Under Classic
8th Overall Tour of Qatar
9th E3 Harelbeke
2014
2nd Trofeo Serra de Tramuntana
2nd Japan Cup
3rd Omloop Het Nieuwsblad
6th Trofeo Muro-Port d'Alcúdia
2015 (5)
National Road Championships

1st Road race
1st Time trial

1st Overall Tour of Britain
2nd Overall Tour of Norway
4th Overall Arctic Race of Norway
6th Overall Danmark Rundt

1st Stage 2

7th Overall Tour des Fjords

1st Stage 5

10th Milan–San Remo
2016 (9)
National Road Championships

1st Road race
1st Time trial

Critérium du Dauphiné

1st Points classification
1st Stage 4

1st Stage 7 Eneco Tour
2nd Overall Tour of Norway

1st Stages 4 & 5

3rd Trofeo Felanitx-Ses Salines-Campos-Porreres
5th Overall Tour of Qatar

1st Stage 3 (ITT)

5th Paris–Roubaix
6th Road race, UCI Road World Championships
6th Overall Tour of Oman

1st Points classification
1st Stages 2 & 5

10th Bretagne Classic
2017 (10)
1st Time trial, National Road Championships
1st Overall Tour des Fjords

1st Points classification
1st Stages 3, 4 & 5

1st Overall Tour of Norway

1st Points classification
1st Stages 1 & 5

1st Stage 19 Tour de France
2nd Overall Tour of Britain

1st Stage 8

7th Time trial, UEC European Road Championships
7th Bretagne Classic
2018 (2)
1st Time trial, National Road Championships
3rd Overall Tour of Norway

1st Stage 2

4th Overall Tour des Fjords
4th Dwars door Vlaanderen
8th Eschborn–Frankfurt
10th Grand Prix Cycliste de Montréal
2019 (3)
1st Stage 1 Critérium du Dauphiné
3rd Time trial, National Road Championships
3rd Overall Tour of Norway

1st Stage 3

9th Overall Volta a la Comunitat Valenciana

1st Stage 1 (ITT)

2020
9th Grand Prix La Marseillaise
2021
6th Tour de Vendée
2022
3rd Road race, National Road Championships
4th Grand Prix La Marseillaise
7th Paris–Camembert
2023
3rd Clàssica Comunitat Valenciana 1969
4th Grand Prix de Denain

=== Classics results timeline ===
Monument	2008	2009	2010	2011	2012	2013	2014	2015	2016	2017	2018	2019	2020	2021	2022	2023	2024
Milan–San Remo	—	93	106	30	25	DNF	29	10	26	19	16	—	100	137	81	—	97
Tour of Flanders	—	66	—	40	19	17	22	—	23	22	19	32	52	84	DNF	DNF	DNF
Paris–Roubaix	—	62	—	—	42	47	21	—	5	64	34	45	NH	30	38	126	77
Liège–Bastogne–Liège	127	—	—	—	—	—	—	—	—	—	—	—	—	—	—	—	—
Giro di Lombardia	—	—	DNF	—	—	—	—	—	DNF	—	—	—	—	—	—	—	—
Classic	2008	2009	2010	2011	2012	2013	2014	2015	2016	2017	2018	2019	2020	2021	2022	2023	2024
Omloop Het Nieuwsblad	—	104	6	41	—	17	3	27	—	—	DNF	52	59	98	DNF	65	113
Kuurne–Brussels–Kuurne	—	47	DNF	8	—	NH	38	13	—	—	DNF	DNF	114	DNF	81	48	74
E3 Harelbeke	—	26	58	—	16	9	17	19	—	99	24	DNF	NH	73	DNF	—	99
Gent–Wevelgem	—	1	DNF	—	5	20	23	DNF	18	44	81	56	45	DNF	92	DNF	94
Dwars door Vlaanderen	—	—	—	—	—	—	—	—	—	—	4	36	NH	—	52	67	110
Amstel Gold Race	76	—	—	—	62	DNF	39	—	56	—	—	—	NH	—	—	—	—
Hamburg Cyclassics	—	25	2	1	5	—	15	76	22	29	—	—	Not held		11	38	—
Bretagne Classic	—	—	—	100	1	—	60	—	10	7	36	—	—	31	—	60	—
Grand Prix Cycliste de Québec	Race did not exist		2	68	DNF	—	55	—	—	—	32	—	Not held		—	—	—
Grand Prix Cycliste de Montréal	Race did not exist		34	15	5	—	47	—	—	—	10	—	Not held		—	—	—

=== Grand Tour general classification results timeline ===
	2009	2010	2011	2012	2013	2014	2015	2016	2017	2018	2019	2020	2021	2022	2023
Giro d'Italia	78	—	—	—	—	DNS-16	—	—	—	—	—	—	—	—	—
Stages won	1	—	—	—	—	0	—	—	—	—	—	—	—	—	—
Mountains classification	—	—	—	—	—	—	—	—	—	—	—	—	—	—	—
Points classification	6	—	—	—	—	—	—	—	—	—	—	—	—	—	—
Tour de France	—	113	53	56	DNF-12	—	82	109	78	84	76	101	HD-15	58	100
Stages won	—	0	2	0	0	—	0	0	1	0	0	0	0	0	0
Mountains classification	—	60	31	57	—	—	58	—	—	—	—	—	—	—	53
Points classification	—	6	6	5	—	—	14	14	3	16	24	23	—	33	73
Vuelta a España	—	—	—	—	84	—	—	—	—	—	96	—	—	—	—
Stages won	—	—	—	—	0	—	—	—	—	—	0	—	—	—	—
Mountains classification	—	—	—	—	24	—	—	—	—	—	—	—	—	—	—
Points classification	—	—	—	—	8	—	—	—	—	—	31	—	—	—	—

Legend
1	Winner
2–3	Top three-finish
4–10	Top ten-finish
11–	Other finish
DNE	Did not enter
DNF-x	Did not finish (retired on stage x)
DNS-x	Did not start (not started on stage x)
HD-x	Finished outside time limit (occurred on stage x)
DSQ	Disqualified
N/A	Race/classification not held
NR	Not ranked in this classification
