= Borut Božič =

Slovenian cyclist (born 1980)

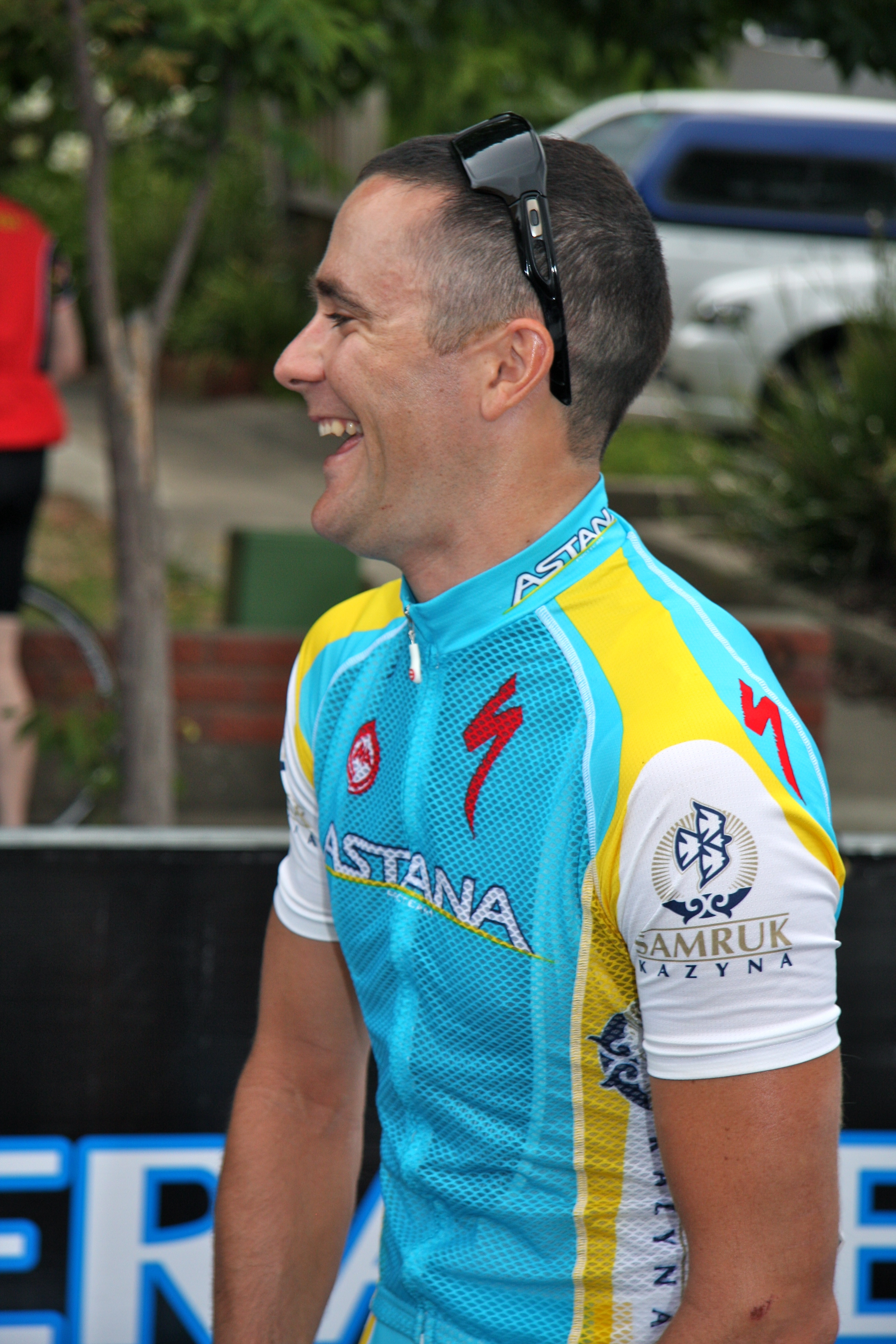
- Božič at the 2012 Tour Down Under

Personal information
- Full name: Borut Božič
- Nickname: Borjo
- Born: 8 August 1980 (age 46) Idrija, Yugoslavia
- Height: 1.80 m (5 ft 11 in)
- Weight: 67 kg (148 lb)

Cycling career
- Sport: Cycling
- Current team: Retired
- Discipline: Road
- Role: Rider; Directeur sportif
- Rider type: Sprinter

Professional teams
- 2004–2006: Perutnina Ptuj
- 2007: Team LPR
- 2008: Cycle Collstrop
- 2009–2011: Vacansoleil
- 2012–2015: Astana
- 2016: Cofidis
- 2017–2018: Bahrain–Merida

Managerial team
- 2019: Bahrain–Merida (directeur sportif)

Major wins
- Grand Tours Vuelta a España 1 individual stage (2009) Stage races Tour de Wallonie (2007) One-day races and Classics National Road Race Championships (2008, 2012)

Borut Božič (born 8 August 1980) is a Slovenian former professional road racing cyclist, who rode professionally between 2004 and 2018 for the Perutnina Ptuj, Team LPR, Cycle Collstrop, Vacansoleil–DCM, Astana, Cofidis and Bahrain–Merida teams.

Considered a sprinter in the mold of Óscar Freire, Božič's career highlights include winning the 2007 Tour de Wallonie, victory in the first stage of the 2009 Tour de Pologne (plus two days in the leader's jersey), winning the sixth stage of the 2009 Vuelta a España, and winning stage five of the 2011 Tour de Suisse. Božič worked as a directeur sportif for the Bahrain–Merida team up to October 2019 but in that month was issued with a 2-year ban for his links to the doping ring uncovered by Operation Aderlass.

== Early and personal life ==
Born in Idrija, Božič got his start in cycling at age 10, despite growing up in a family with no connection to the sport. Though his friends cycled, his dad was a football player – so he looked to his compatriot Valter Bonca for inspiration. Božič is married to Klemintina, with whom he has a son, Sas. The family resides in Idrija, Slovenia. During the first three years of his career, Božič also trained for skiing, though by age 24 he realized he could make a living as a professional cyclist.

== Professional career ==
Božič turned professional in 2004 with Perutnina Ptuj. He moved to the Italian Team LPR in 2007, but left for Belgian squad Cycle Collstrop in 2008. Božič's most successful season to date was 2009, his first with Vacansoleil, which he finished by taking third place in the Paris–Tours classic behind winner Philippe Gilbert and runner-up Tom Boonen. Božič escaped with the two Belgians with 7 kilometres (4.3 miles) to go, at the base of the Côte de l'Epan after an attack from Gilbert's teammate Greg Van Avermaet. Having led the trio into the final 300 metres (980 feet) on the Avenue du Grammont, Božič attempted to contest the sprint, but he was gapped by Gilbert with 150 metres (490 feet) to the line, and cut short his effort. He also won stage six of the Vuelta a España.

After extending his contract with Vacansoleil through 2011, Božič was able to train calmly during the winter, and he resumed his winning ways in 2010. Božič claimed stages 1 and 2 of the Étoile de Bessèges in France, and placed second on the third. He started the fourth stage as leader of the general classification, but lost over 20 minutes to eventual race winner Samuel Dumoulin (Cofidis). Nevertheless, Božič's consistency was rewarded with overall victory in the points classification, where he finished with 79 points, four more than the runner-up Niko Eeckhout of Belgium (An Post–Sean Kelly). Božič's next result of merit was a 12th-place in the 204-kilometre (127-mile) East Flanders classic, Omloop Het Nieuwsblad, where he arrived in the first chase group, 18 seconds in arrears of eventual race winner Juan Antonio Flecha (Team Sky). Unfortunately, the 2010 season was ultimately a quiet one for Božič, and he did not score a major victory.

In 2011, a frustrated Božič continued racing a similar program to years past, but he crashed out of May's Giro d'Italia and saw his progress disrupted. Taking into account their rider's two falls in Italy and general lack of results, the team reworked Božič's schedule and conceptualized an alternative approach according to Vacansoleil's sports director Jean-Paul van Poppel, who explained:

"Due to the crashes Božič couldn't follow up to a start in the Giro and get the results he was aiming for in the season. However, after the Giro we made plans with Božič. We decided he would firstly compete in the Tour of Luxembourg to build him up for races and then we agreed the Tour of Switzerland was a race that would help him get some good results in the Tour de France. The plan is coming together nicely."

Božič finally returned to the winner's circle on the UCI World Tour with a dramatic and emotional victory in the fifth stage of the Tour de Suisse. There, Božič crossed the finish line in tears after having countered a daring move by his Italian teammate Marco Marcato in the final kilometre, winning ahead of Spain's Óscar Freire, with the Slovak Peter Sagan of Liquigas–Cannondale in third.

Wiping the tears from his eyes while giving an interview immediately following his win, Božič told the press that he could not believe he had triumphed after such a long gap without a major victory:

"My last [big] win was in 2009, a stage in the Tour of Spain and even today I hadn't expected to do so well. I told my teammate Marcato to attack in the last kilometre because I felt a bit rough and that, if he couldn't make it, I'd try for the sprint. We were lucky it all worked out. I've had a very difficult last six months, no wins and never really feeling good on the bike. Today I thought it wasn't my day either but, with 50 meters to go, I got on Freire's back wheel, then got past him at the last possible moment."

Božič's win gave added impetus to his push for a coveted spot on Vacansoleil's Tour de France roster, and he ultimately made his first start at the race, taking four top-ten stage finishes.

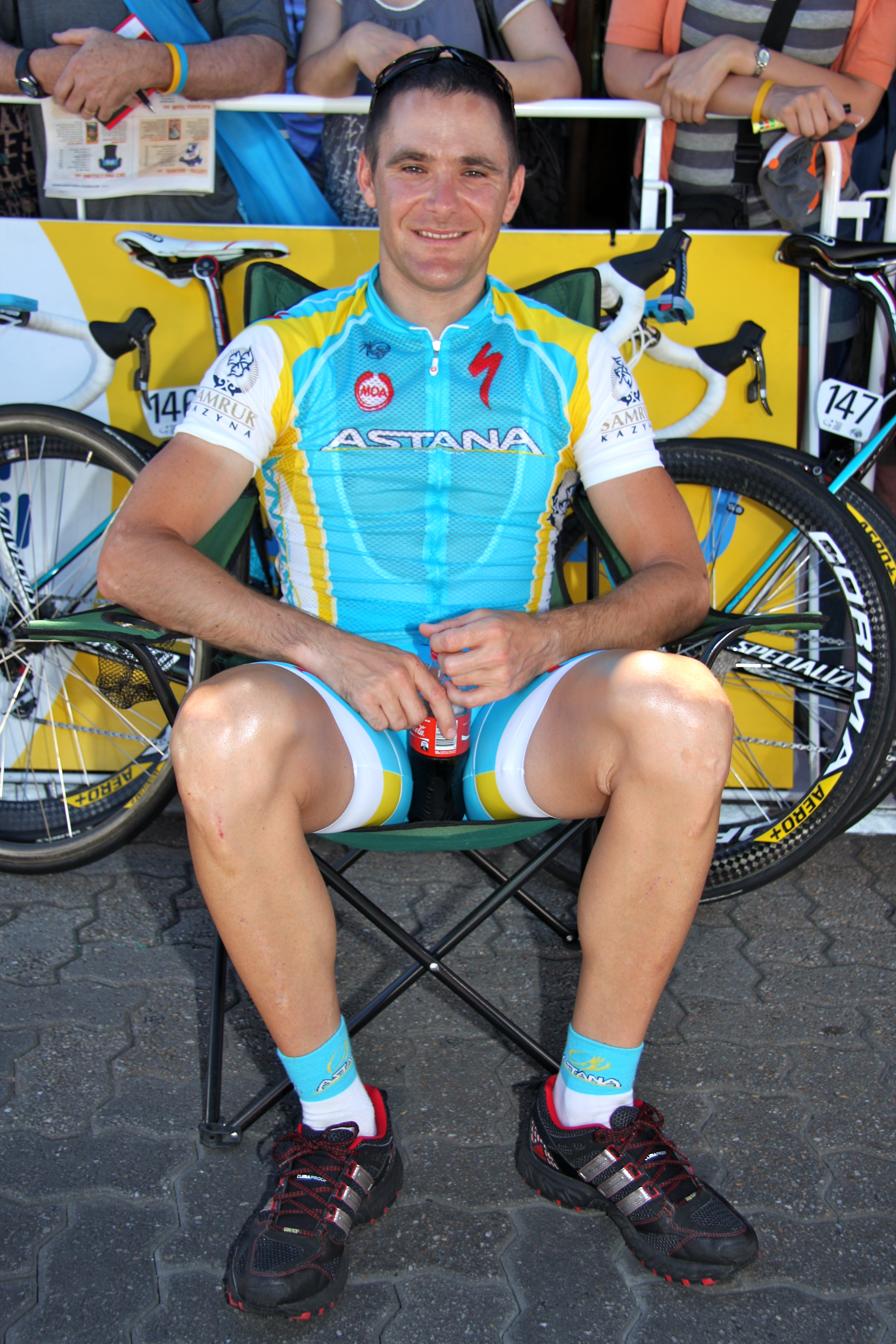
Božič at the 2012 Tour Down Under.

Božič joined Astana for the 2012 season. In October 2015 Cofidis announced that Božič would be part of their squad for 2016.

== Major results ==
2002
1st Stage 5b Grand Prix Guillaume Tell
10th Coppa San Geo
2003
8th Gran Premio Industrie del Marmo
10th Circuito del Porto
2004
Tour of Slovenia

1st Stages 2 & 3

1st Stage 6 Tour de Serbie
3rd Overall Jadranska Magistrala

1st Stage 2

3rd Omloop van de Vlaamse Scheldeboorden
5th Grand Prix de Denain
2005
1st Overall Jadranska Magistrala

1st Stage 1

1st Stage 3 Tour de l'Avenir
2nd Poreč Trophy
8th Overall Circuit des Ardennes
8th GP Kranj
2006
1st Overall Jadranska Magistrala

1st Prologue

Vuelta a Cuba

1st Stages 4, 11b & 13

Tour of Slovenia

1st Points classification
1st Stages 1 & 4

Olympia's Tour

1st Stages 2, 3 & 8

2nd Overall Circuit des Ardennes

1st Stage 1

3rd Poreč Trophy
10th Trofeo Zsšdi
2007
1st Overall Tour de Wallonie
1st GP Kranj
1st Stage 3 Tour of Ireland
4th Tour de Rijke
2008
1st Road race, National Road Championships
1st Stage 5 Étoile de Bessèges
1st Stage 4 Vuelta a Andalucía
6th Overall Delta Tour Zeeland

1st Stage 3

6th Kuurne–Brussels–Kuurne
9th Paris–Brussels
10th Scheldeprijs
2009
1st Stage 6 Vuelta a España
Tour of Belgium

1st Stages 2 & 3

1st Stage 1 Tour de Pologne
1st Stage 1 Tour du Limousin
3rd Overall Ster Elektrotoer
3rd Paris–Tours
5th Overall Tour de Picardie
6th Overall Three Days of De Panne
6th Hel van het Mergelland
9th Paris–Bourges
2010
Étoile de Bessèges

1st Stages 1 & 2

2nd Overall Tour of Britain

1st Stage 7

3rd Time trial, National Road Championships
6th Overall Tour de Picardie
2011
1st Stage 5 Tour de Suisse
3rd Vattenfall Cyclassics
4th Grand Prix d'Isbergues
6th London–Surrey Cycle Classic
6th Paris–Bruxelles
7th Road race, UCI Road World Championships
9th Memorial Rik Van Steenbergen
2012
1st Road race, National Road Championships
2nd Clásica de Almería
6th GP Stad Zottegem
8th GP Ouest–France
8th Grand Prix Pino Cerami
10th Vattenfall Cyclassics
2013
2nd Gent–Wevelgem
2nd Dwars door Vlaanderen
5th Grand Prix de Fourmies
9th GP Ouest–France
2014
3rd Dwars door Vlaanderen
7th E3 Harelbeke
2015
3rd Road race, National Road Championships
2016
5th Route Adélie

=== Grand Tour general classification results timeline ===
Grand Tour	2009	2010	2011	2012	2013	2014	2015	2016	2017
Giro d'Italia	—	—	DNF	—	—	124	—	—	—
Tour de France	—	—	136	129	—	—	—	DNF	160
Vuelta a España	102	—	—	—	—	—	—	—	—

Legend
—	Did not compete
DNF	Did not finish
