= Yoann Offredo =

French road bicycle racer

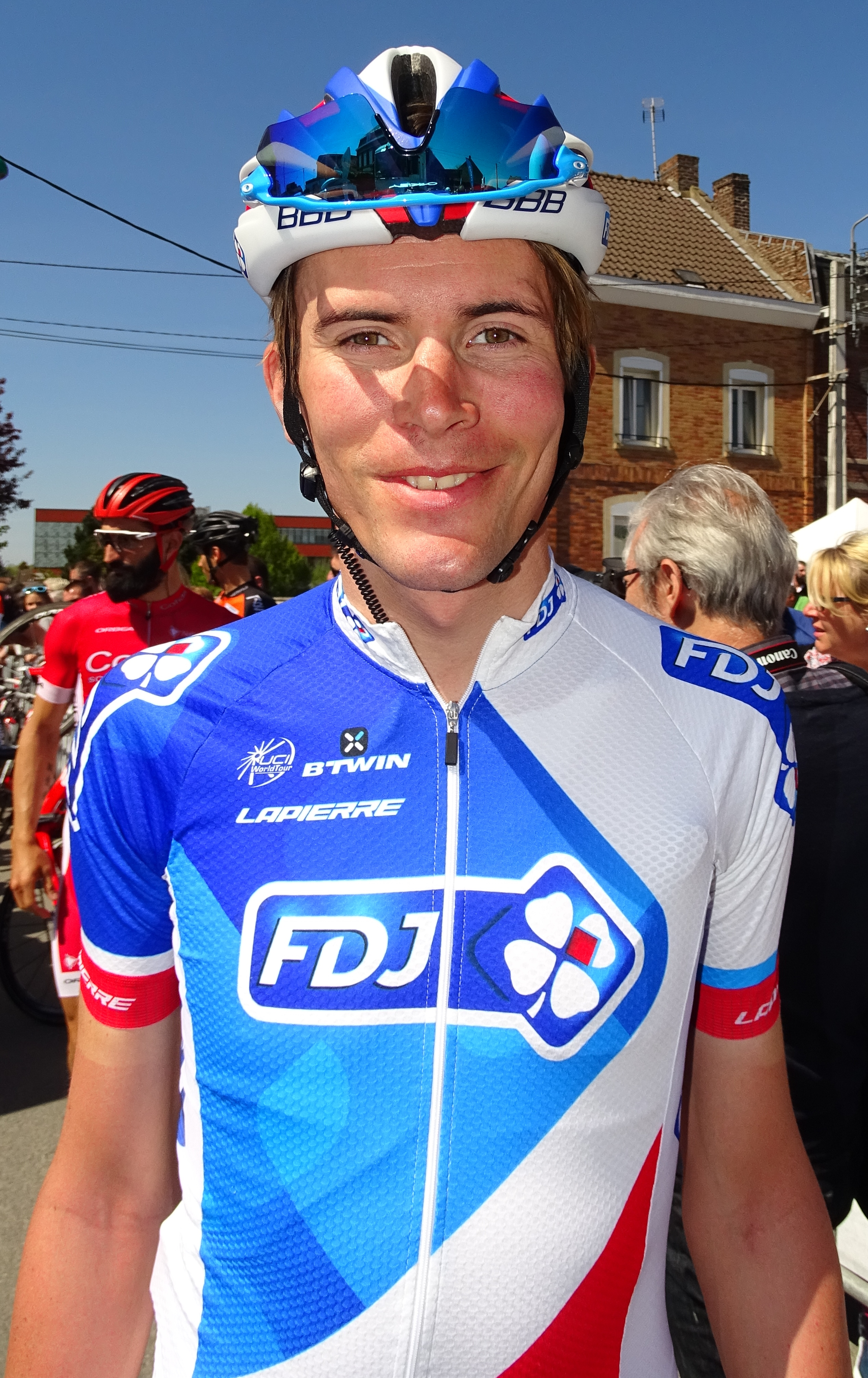
- Offredo in 2016

Personal information
- Full name: Yoann Offredo
- Born: 12 November 1986 (age 39) Savigny-sur-Orge, France
- Height: 1.89 m (6 ft 2 1/2 in)
- Weight: 66 kg (146 lb; 10 st 6 lb)

Cycling career
- Sport: Cycling
- Current team: Retired
- Discipline: Road
- Role: Rider
- Rider type: Rouleur

Amateur teams
- 2006: US La Gacilly–US Créteil
- 2007: CC Nogent-sur-Oise
- 2007: Française des Jeux (stagiaire)

Professional teams
- 2008–2016: Française des Jeux
- 2017–2020: Wanty–Groupe Gobert

Yoann Offredo (born 12 November 1986) is a French former professional road bicycle racer, who rode professionally between 2008 and 2020, for the FDJ and Circus–Wanty Gobert teams. His only professional victory came at the 2009 Tour de Picardie, where he won stage 4.

He is best known for his efforts in the spring classics where he has finished 14th in the 2017 Tour of Flanders and the 2017 Paris–Roubaix. His best result in a monument came at the 2011 Milan–San Remo where he finished 7th after trying a late attack. He has competed in the Tour de France on three occasions, in 2017, 2018, and 2019, where he was often seen in the breakaway. Offredo is a user of the popular fitness site Strava, where he posts regular rides from his training and races.

== Career ==
=== Française des Jeux (2008–2016) ===
Offredo turned professional with Française des Jeux in 2008, after riding as a stagiaire with the team in 2007.

In 2010, Offredo finished 16th at Milan–San Remo, after attacking solo on the Poggio di San Remo. He also finished 3rd in the Pro Tour Classic GP Ouest France – Plouay. He started in the Vuelta a España which was his first Grand Tour start. He abandoned the race on stage 10. Offredo also finished 7th in Paris–Tours.

In the first Belgian classics race of the 2011 season, Offredo finished 4th at Omloop Het Nieuwsblad. One month later, he started at Milan–San Remo, and finished 7th; his best result in a monument classic. A week later he started Gent–Wevelgem and just missed out on the top 10, with an 11th-place finish, despite a crash earlier in the race. After the race, it was found that he had suffered a heel injury, and as a result, he had to miss the Tour of Flanders.

After missing three whereabouts tests, Offredo received a 1-year ban at the start of the 2012 season. Upon his return to professional cycling in 2013, he finished 5th in the French National Road Race Championships.

=== Wanty–Groupe Gobert (2017–2020) ===
In the 2017 season, Offredo turned out for the Belgian Professional Continental team, Wanty–Groupe Gobert. He achieved some of his best results during the classics campaign, with a 14th place in both the Tour of Flanders and Paris–Roubaix. He also rode the Tour de France for the first time, and attacked on several stages. On Stage 2, Offredo got in the breakaway, and won the Combativity award, after a late attack from the breakaway with Taylor Phinney. He was also in the breakaway on Stage 10 with fellow Frenchman, Élie Gesbert.

Offredo started his 2018 season at the Grand Prix d'Ouverture La Marseillaise where he finished in 20th position. His best result in the 2018 season came in February where he placed 13th at the Vuelta a Murcia. At the end of March, Offredo suffered from a sprained ankle, which made him abandon the Tour of Flanders. Offredo started his second Tour de France, and was in the breakaway on the opening stage, securing the Combativity award just as he did in on the first mass start stage in 2017. Offredo was also in the breakaway on Stage 7 but as the stage was 231 kilometres (144 miles) long, and as he was the only man in the breakaway, he quickly returned to the peloton.

== Major results ==
2006
2nd Chrono des Herbiers
2007
2nd Tour de la Somme
2nd Chrono des Herbiers
2009
1st Stage 4 Tour de Picardie
5th Overall Tour de Wallonie
9th Grand Prix de Denain
2010
3rd GP Ouest–France
7th Paris–Tours
8th Grand Prix d'Isbergues
2011
4th Omloop Het Nieuwsblad
7th Milan–San Remo
8th Overall Delta Tour Zeeland
10th GP Ouest–France
2013
5th Road race, National Road Championships
2016
6th Classic Loire Atlantique
8th Overall Four Days of Dunkirk
2017
Combativity award Stage 2 Tour de France
2018
Combativity award Stage 1 Tour de France
2019
Combativity award Stage 7 Tour de France

=== Grand Tour general classification results timeline ===
Grand Tour	2008	2009	2010	2011	2012	2013	2014	2015	2016	2017	2018	2019
Giro d'Italia	—	—	—	—	—	—	—	—	—	—	—	—
Tour de France	—	—	—	—	—	—	—	—	—	110	91	154
Vuelta a España	—	—	DNF	—	—	—	—	—	—	—	—	—

=== Classics & Monuments results timeline ===
Monument	2008	2009	2010	2011	2012	2013	2014	2015	2016	2017	2018	2019
Milan–San Remo	—	51	16	7	—	19	16	34	—	—	—	—
Tour of Flanders	87	50	75	—	—	16	21	30	—	14	DNF	—
Paris–Roubaix	87	85	61	—	—	DNF	59	32	—	14	—	—
Liège–Bastogne–Liège	—	—	—	—	—	—	—	—	—	—	—	—
Giro di Lombardia	—	DNF	DNF	—	—	—	—	—	—	—	—	
Classic	2008	2009	2010	2011	2012	2013	2014	2015	2016	2017	2018	2019
Omloop Het Nieuwsblad	—	38	14	4	—	38	20	26	84	27	28	—
Kuurne–Brussels–Kuurne	23	37	23	DNF	—	—	26	DNF	32	49	36	—
Dwars door Vlaanderen	27	—	—	21	—	—	—	—	—	50	108	—
E3 Harelbeke	DNF	12	22	DNF	—	13	31	16	—	DNF	DNF	—
Gent-Wevelgem	—	DNF	DNF	11	—	27	26	DNF	DNF	30	DNF	—
Bretagne Classic – Ouest France	—	—	3	10	—	14	36	—	19	25	27	
Paris-Tours	—	51	7	43	—	31	25	—	48	—	25	

Legend
—	Did not compete
DNF	Did not finish
