= 2007 Tour of Ireland =

Cycling race

- Thirty-third edition of the Tour of Ireland

Details
- Dates: 22 - 26 August, 2007
- Location: Kilkenny to Dublin
- Races: 5

Champions
- Individual champion: (Belgium) Stijn Vandenbergh

The 2007 Tour of Ireland took place between the 22 and the 26 of August. It was the first Tour of Ireland race to take place in fifteen years. The overall classification was won by Stijn Vandenbergh, who finished 20 seconds ahead of Marcus Ljungqvist.

== Stages ==
Stage	Route	Distance	Date	Winner	Team
1	Kilkenny - Cork	174 km (108 mi)	Wednesday, 22 August	Stijn Vandenbergh	
2	Clonakilty - Killarney	166 km (103 mi)	Thursday, 23 August	Matti Breschel	
3	Tralee - Ennis	194 km (121 mi)	Friday, 24 August	Borut Božič	
4	Galway	232.5 km (144.5 mi)	Saturday, 25 August	Edvald Boasson Hagen	
5	Athlone - Dublin	147.7 km (91.8 mi)	Sunday, 26 August	Marco Marcato	

Stage (Winner, team)	General Classification	Points Classification	Mountains Classification	Young Rider Classification	Team Classification
Stage 1 (Stijn Vandenbergh, Unibet.com)	Stijn Vandenbergh (Unibet.com)	Stijn Vandenbergh (Unibet.com)	Roger Beuchat	Stijn Vandenbergh (Unibet.com)	Unibet.com
Stage 2 (Matti Breschel, Team CSC)	Stijn Vandenbergh (Unibet.com)	Matti Breschel (Team CSC)	Luis Pasamontes (Unibet)	Stijn Vandenbergh (Unibet.com)	Unibet.com
Stage 3 (Borut Božič, Team LPR)	Stijn Vandenbergh (Unibet.com)	Matti Breschel (Team CSC)	Luis Pasamontes (Unibet)	Stijn Vandenbergh (Unibet.com)	Unibet.com
Stage 4 (Edvald Boasson Hagen, Maxbo-Bianchi)	Stijn Vandenbergh (Unibet.com)	Edvald Boasson Hagen (Maxbo-Bianchi)	Roger Beuchat	Stijn Vandenbergh (Unibet.com)	Unibet.com
Stage 5 (Marco Marcato, Team LPR)	Stijn Vandenbergh (Unibet.com)	Matti Breschel (Team CSC)	Roger Beuchat	Stijn Vandenbergh (Unibet.com)	Unibet.com
Final	Stijn Vandenbergh (Unibet.com)	Matti Breschel (Team CSC)	Roger Beuchat	Stijn Vandenbergh (Unibet.com)	Unibet.com
