= Frédéric Gabriel =

Personal information
- Born: 20 July 1970 (age 56) Blesmes, France

Cycling career
- Sport: Cycling
- Current team: Retired
- Discipline: Road
- Role: Rider

Professional teams
- 1995–1998: Mutuelle de Seine-et-Marne
- 1999: Home Market–Ville de Charleroi
- 2000–2001: Bonjour
- 2002–2003: Saint-Quentin–Oktos
- 2004–2006: Mr. Bookmaker–Palmans–Collstrop
- 2007: Landbouwkrediet–Tönissteiner

Frédéric Gabriel (born 20 July 1970) is a French former road cyclist. He was professional from 1995 to 2007, and most notably won the Tour Nord-Isère in 1994 and the Tour de la Somme in 2003.

== Major results ==
1994
1st Overall Tour Nord-Isère
3rd Paris–Chauny
1997
3rd Overall Circuit des Mines

1st Stage 1

10th Overall Route du Sud
1998
2nd Overall Tour de Serbie
3rd Overall Tour de l'Oise
4th Overall Tour de l'Ain

1st Stage 1

4th Polymultipliée de l'Hautil
2000
1st Stage 3 Tour de l'Ain
2001
8th Giro della Provincia di Siracusa
2002
5th Tour du Doubs
2003
1st Overall Tour de la Somme
6th Grand Prix d'Isbergues
8th Boucles de l'Aulne
8th Tour du Finistère
2004
4th Tour du Doubs
7th Polynormande
9th Overall Paris–Corrèze
9th GP de Villers Cotterêts
2006
10th Tour du Finistère
2007
2nd Overall Tour de Wallonie
