= 2012 GP Ouest-France =

2012 UCI World Tour, race 24 of 28

Race details
- Dates: 26 August 2012
- Stages: 1
- Distance: 243 km (151.0 mi)
- Winning time: 5h 55' 28"

Results
	Winner	Edvald Boasson Hagen (Norway)	(Team Sky)
	Second	Rui Costa (Portugal)	(Movistar Team)
	Third	Heinrich Haussler (Australia)	(Garmin–Sharp)

The 2012 GP Ouest-France was the 76th edition of the GP Ouest-France, a single-day cycling race. It was held on 26 August 2012, over a distance of 243 km (151.0 mi), starting and finishing in Plouay, France. It was the twenty-fourth race of the 2012 UCI World Tour season.

The race was won by Team Sky's Edvald Boasson Hagen, after breaking away from the peloton to catch solo leader Rui Costa of the Movistar Team, and accelerated away from him to beat the field by five seconds in Plouay. Costa managed to hold off the rest of the field for second place, while the bunch sprint for third place was taken by Garmin–Sharp's Heinrich Haussler.

== Teams ==
As the GP Ouest-France was a UCI World Tour event, all 18 UCI ProTeams were invited automatically and obligated to send a squad. Five other squads were given wildcard places into the race, and as such, formed the event's 23-team peloton.

The 23 teams that competed in the race were:

- Ag2r–La Mondiale
- Argos–Shimano
- Astana
- BMC Racing Team
- Bretagne–Schuller
- Cofidis
- Team Europcar
- Euskaltel–Euskadi
- FDJ–BigMat
- Garmin–Sharp
- Team Katusha
- Lampre–ISD
- Liquigas–Cannondale
- Lotto–Belisol
- Movistar Team
- Omega Pharma–Quick-Step
- Orica–GreenEDGE
- Rabobank
- RadioShack–Nissan
- Saur–Sojasun
- Saxo Bank–Tinkoff Bank
- Team Sky
- Vacansoleil–DCM

== Results ==
	Cyclist	Team	Time	UCI World Tour Points
1	Edvald Boasson Hagen (NOR)	Team Sky	5h 55' 28"	80
2	Rui Costa (POR)	Movistar Team	+ 5"	60
3	Heinrich Haussler (AUS)	Garmin–Sharp	+ 5"	50
4	Matthew Goss (AUS)	Orica–GreenEDGE	+ 5"	40
5	Jürgen Roelandts (BEL)	Lotto–Belisol	+ 5"	30
6	Marco Marcato (ITA)	Vacansoleil–DCM	+ 5"	22
7	Giacomo Nizzolo (ITA)	RadioShack–Nissan	+ 5"	14
8	Borut Božič (SLO)	Astana	+ 5"	10
9	Samuel Dumoulin (FRA)	Cofidis	+ 5"	–
10	Luca Paolini (ITA)	Team Katusha	+ 5"	2
