= 2010 GP Ouest-France =

2010 UCI World Ranking, race 22 of 26

Race details
- Dates: August 22
- Stages: 1
- Distance: 248.3 km (154.3 mi)
- Winning time: 6h 37' 53"

Results
	Winner	Matthew Goss (AUS)	(Team HTC–Columbia)
	Second	Tyler Farrar (USA)	(Garmin–Transitions)
	Third	Yoann Offredo (FRA)	(FDJ)

The 2010 GP Ouest-France was a one-day road race which took place on 22 August 2010 in Plouay, France. The race was held over 248.3 kilometres (154.3 mi), which is 12 laps of a circuit. 2010 was the sixth time that the race was a part of the UCI ProTour, but the race can be dated back to 1931 at its present location.

== Results ==
Rank	Cyclist	Team	Time	UCI World Ranking Points
1	Matthew Goss (AUS)	Team HTC–Columbia	6h 37' 53"	80
2	Tyler Farrar (USA)	Garmin–Transitions	s.t.	60
3	Yoann Offredo (FRA)	FDJ	s.t.	50
4	Leonardo Duque (COL)	Cofidis	s.t.	40
5	José Joaquín Rojas (ESP)	Caisse d'Epargne	s.t.	30
6	Mauro Santambrogio (ITA)	BMC Racing Team	s.t.	20
7	Peter Sagan (SVK)	Liquigas–Doimo	s.t.	10
8	Francesco Gavazzi (ITA)	Lampre–Farnese	s.t.	8
9	Marco Marcato (ITA)	Vacansoleil	s.t.	6
10	Romain Feillu (FRA)	Vacansoleil	s.t.	2

== Teams ==
Twenty five teams were invited to the 2010 GP Ouest-France.

Teams from the UCI Pro Tour

- Ag2r–La Mondiale
- Astana
- Caisse d'Epargne
- Euskaltel–Euskadi
- Footon–Servetto–Fuji
- Française des Jeux
- Garmin–Transitions
- Lampre–Farnese
- Liquigas–Doimo
- Omega Pharma–Lotto
- Quick-Step
- Rabobank
- Team Sky
- Team HTC–Columbia
- Team Katusha
- Team Milram
- Team RadioShack
- Team Saxo Bank

Teams awarded a wildcard invitation

- Vacansoleil
- BMC Racing Team
- Skil–Shimano
- Cervélo TestTeam
- Saur–Sojasun
- Cofidis
- Bbox Bouygues Telecom
