= 2007 Tour de Wallonie =

Race details
- Dates: 28 July–1 August 2007
- Stages: 5
- Distance: 880.5 km (547.1 mi)
- Winning time: 21h 43' 20"

Results
	Winner	Borut Božič (SLO)
	Second	Frédéric Gabriel (FRA)
	Third	Pietro Caucchioli (ITA)

The 2007 Tour de Wallonie was the 34th edition of the Tour de Wallonie cycle race and was held from 28 July to 1 August 2007. The race started in Haccourt and finished in Barvaux. The race was won by Borut Božič.

== General classification ==
Final general classification

Rank	Rider	Time
1	Borut Božič (SLO)	21h 43' 20"
2	Frédéric Gabriel (FRA)	+ 14"
3	Pietro Caucchioli (ITA)	+ 51"
4	Antonio Bucciero (ITA)	+ 1' 40"
5	Alexandr Kolobnev (RUS)	+ 1' 45"
6	Johan Coenen (BEL)	+ 2' 00"
7	Jeremy Hunt (GBR)	+ 2' 05"
8	Peter Van Petegem (BEL)	+ 2' 24"
9	Andy Cappelle (BEL)	+ 2' 51"
10	Christophe Brandt (BEL)	+ 3' 08"
