= 2011 Milan–San Remo =

2011 UCI World Tour, race 4 of 27
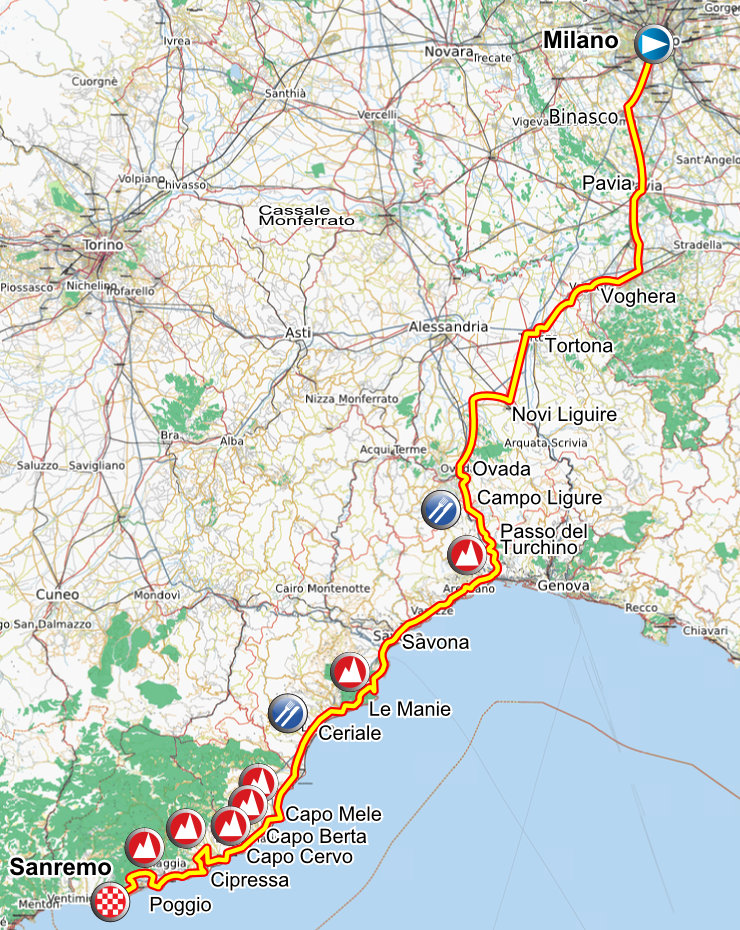
- Route of 2008 - 2011

Race details
- Dates: 19 March 2011
- Stages: 1
- Distance: 298 km (185 mi)
- Winning time: 6h 51' 10"

Results
	Winner	Matthew Goss (AUS)	(HTC–Highroad)
	Second	Fabian Cancellara (SUI)	(Leopard Trek)
	Third	Philippe Gilbert (BEL)	(Omega Pharma–Lotto)

The 2011 Milan–San Remo was the 102nd running of the Milan–San Remo single-day cycling race. It was held on 19 March over a distance of 298 kilometres (185.2 miles) and was the fourth race of the 2011 UCI World Tour season.

The race was won by HTC–Highroad rider Matthew Goss, who was part of an eight-man group that battled for the victory, in a sprint finish. Goss finished ahead of Leopard Trek's Fabian Cancellara – the winner of the race in 2008 – and Omega Pharma–Lotto's Philippe Gilbert, who completed the podium.

== Teams ==
25 teams competed in the 2011 Milan–San Remo. Each team had been scheduled to start with eight riders, making a starting peloton of 200; but only 198 started the race. They were:

- Acqua & Sapone
- Ag2r–La Mondiale
- Androni Giocattoli
- Astana
- BMC Racing Team
- Cofidis
- Colnago–CSF Inox
- Euskaltel–Euskadi
- Farnese Vini–Neri Sottoli
- FDJ
- Garmin–Cervélo
- Geox–TMC
- HTC–Highroad
- Lampre–ISD
- Leopard Trek
- Liquigas–Cannondale
- Omega Pharma–Lotto
- Quick-Step
- Rabobank
- Team Katusha
- Movistar Team
- Team RadioShack
- Saxo Bank–SunGard
- Team Sky
- Vacansoleil–DCM

== Results ==
	Cyclist	Team	Time
1	Matthew Goss (AUS)	HTC–Highroad	6h 51' 10"
2	Fabian Cancellara (SUI)	Leopard Trek	s.t.
3	Philippe Gilbert (BEL)	Omega Pharma–Lotto	s.t.
4	Alessandro Ballan (ITA)	BMC Racing Team	s.t.
5	Filippo Pozzato (ITA)	Team Katusha	s.t.
6	Michele Scarponi (ITA)	Lampre–ISD	s.t.
7	Yoann Offredo (FRA)	FDJ	s.t.
8	Vincenzo Nibali (ITA)	Liquigas–Cannondale	+ 3"
9	Greg Van Avermaet (BEL)	BMC Racing Team	+ 10"
10	Stuart O'Grady (AUS)	Leopard Trek	+ 12"
