= Van Alderwerelt =

Dutch patrician family

van Alderwerelt
- family
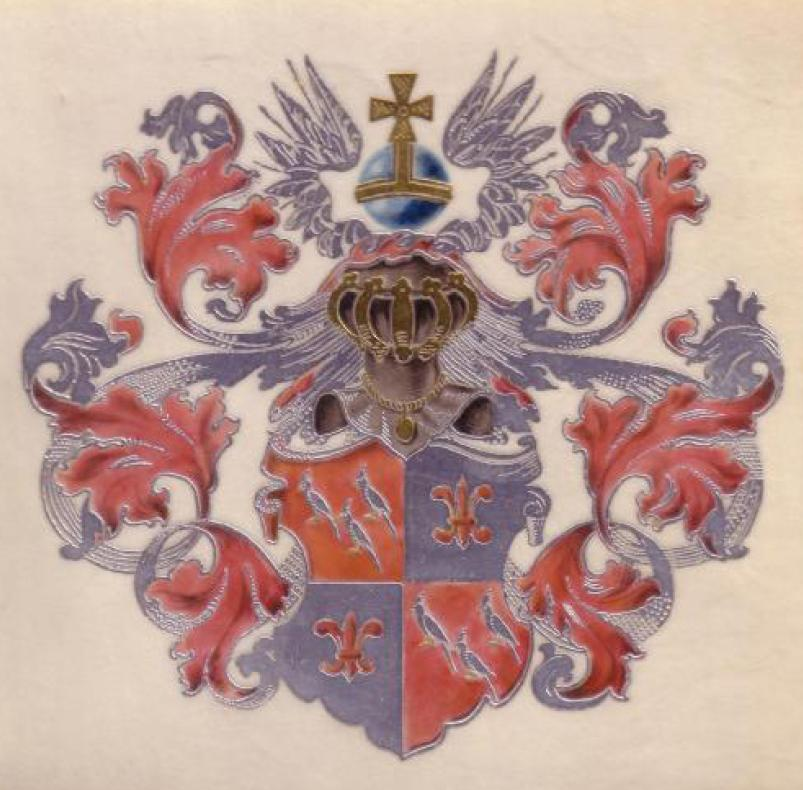
- Country: Netherlands
- Founded: 16th century
- Founder: Cornelis van Alderwerelt

Van Alderwerelt (also: Van Alderwerelt van Rosenburgh, Van Alderwerelt Houttuijn en: De Roo van Alderwerelt) is a Dutch patrician family.

The oldest known ancestor Cornelis van Alderwerelt lived in Menen (Belgium) in the 16th century. The name is the result of the wedding in 1751 of Joan Carel van Alderwerelt and Alida Anna de Roo. Their second son Willem Pieter van Alderwerelt, added his mother's name to that of his father.

== Bibliography ==
- Nederland's Patriciaat 42 (1956), pp. 23–43.
- Nederland's Adelsboek 79 (1988), pp. 75–79.
