= Matthew Goss =

Australian cyclist (born 1986)

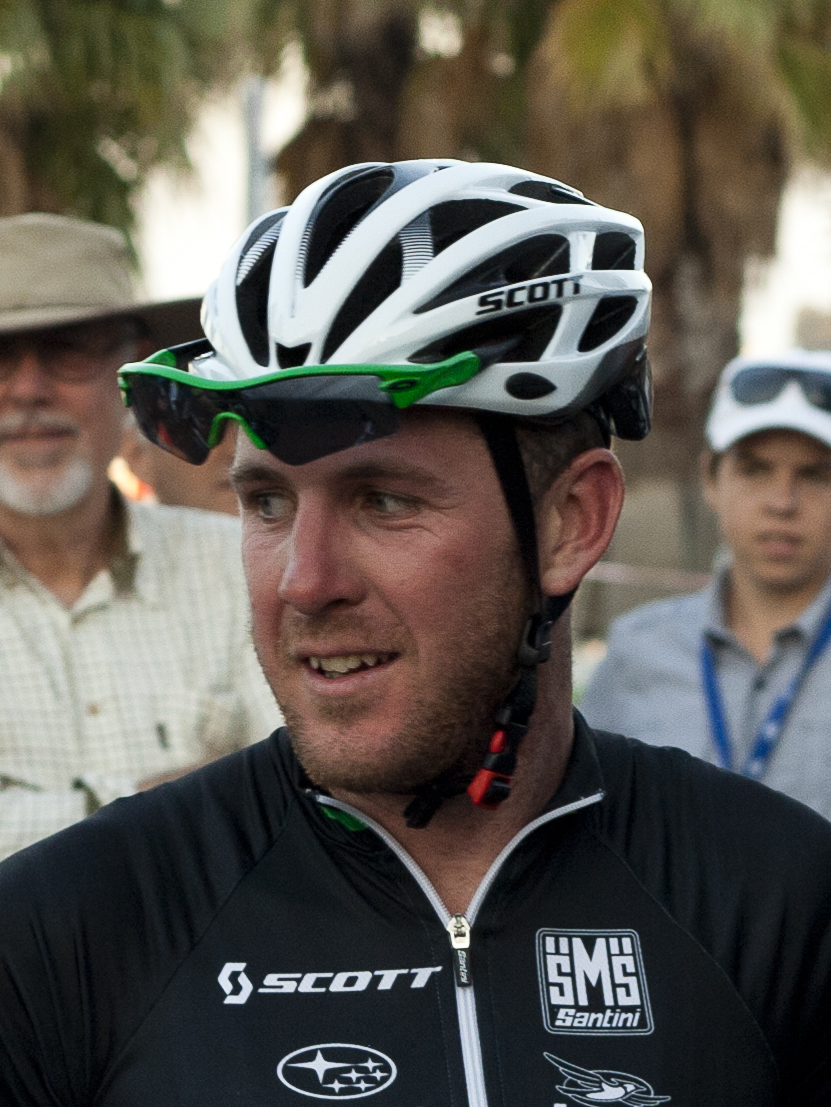
- Goss at the 2013 Jayco Bay Crits

Personal information
- Full name: Matthew Harley Goss
- Nicknames: Gossy, The Boss
- Born: 5 November 1986 (age 39) Launceston, Tasmania, Australia
- Height: 1.77 m (5 ft 10 in)
- Weight: 70 kg (154 lb)

Cycling career
- Sport: Cycling
- Current team: Retired
- Discipline: Road
- Role: Rider
- Rider type: Sprinter

Amateur team
- 2006: Southaustralia.com–AIS

Professional teams
- 2007–2009: Team CSC
- 2010–2011: Team HTC–Columbia
- 2012–2014: GreenEDGE
- 2015: MTN–Qhubeka
- 2016: ONE Pro Cycling

Major wins
- Grand Tours Giro d'Italia 2 individual stages (2010, 2012) One-day races and Classics Milan–San Remo (2011) GP Ouest–France (2010) Paris–Brussels (2009)
Medal record
Representing Australia
Men's road bicycle racing
World Championships
Silver medal – second place	2011 Copenhagen	Road race
Men's track cycling
World Championships
Gold medal – first place	2006 Bordeaux	Team Pursuit
Commonwealth Games
Silver medal – second place	2006 Melbourne	Team Pursuit

Matthew Harley Goss (born 5 November 1986) is a former Australian professional road and track racing cyclist, his final professional team before retirement was the UCI Professional Continental team ONE Pro Cycling. He first competed in track cycling before making a transition to the road. He won a gold medal at the 2006 UCI Track Cycling World Championships in the Team Pursuit event and came in second place at the 2011 World Championships Road race. He also won the 2010 GP Ouest-France, the 2011 Milan–San Remo as well as 2 stages of the Giro d'Italia, among other victories.

== Career ==
Born in Launceston, Tasmania, Goss started in the sport competing in track cycling. In 2005, he won a bronze medal in the Team Pursuit at the World Championships in Los Angeles along with Ashley Hutchinson, Mark Jamieson and Stephen Wooldridge. Then the following year he won the gold medal in Bordeaux with Peter Dawson, Mark Jamieson and Stephen Wooldridge.

In parallel with the successes on the track, he started his career on the road with the Australian team Southaustralia.com–AIS team which participated in major competitions dedicated to the Under-23. Goss had numerous victories, including Liberation Grand Prix and the Tour of the Regions.

In 2007 he turned pro with Bjarne Riis's Team CSC. In the first two years as a professional he won two stages at the Tour of Britain, one in 2007 and another in the next edition. Goss finished second at the Commerce Bank International Championship and third at the Delta Profronde. With CSC he also won the Eindhoven Team Time Trial 2007, an UCI ProTour team time trial included in the calendar.

In 2008, he took the first stage of the Herald Sun Tour. In these races he became known for his sprinter characteristics and also demonstrated qualities in other disciplines, proving strong on the cobbles, finishing third in the Belgian semi-classic Kuurne–Brussels–Kuurne.

He confirmed his qualities later in 2009 by winning Paris–Brussels, two stages of the Tour de Wallonie and finishing third at Gent–Wevelgem.

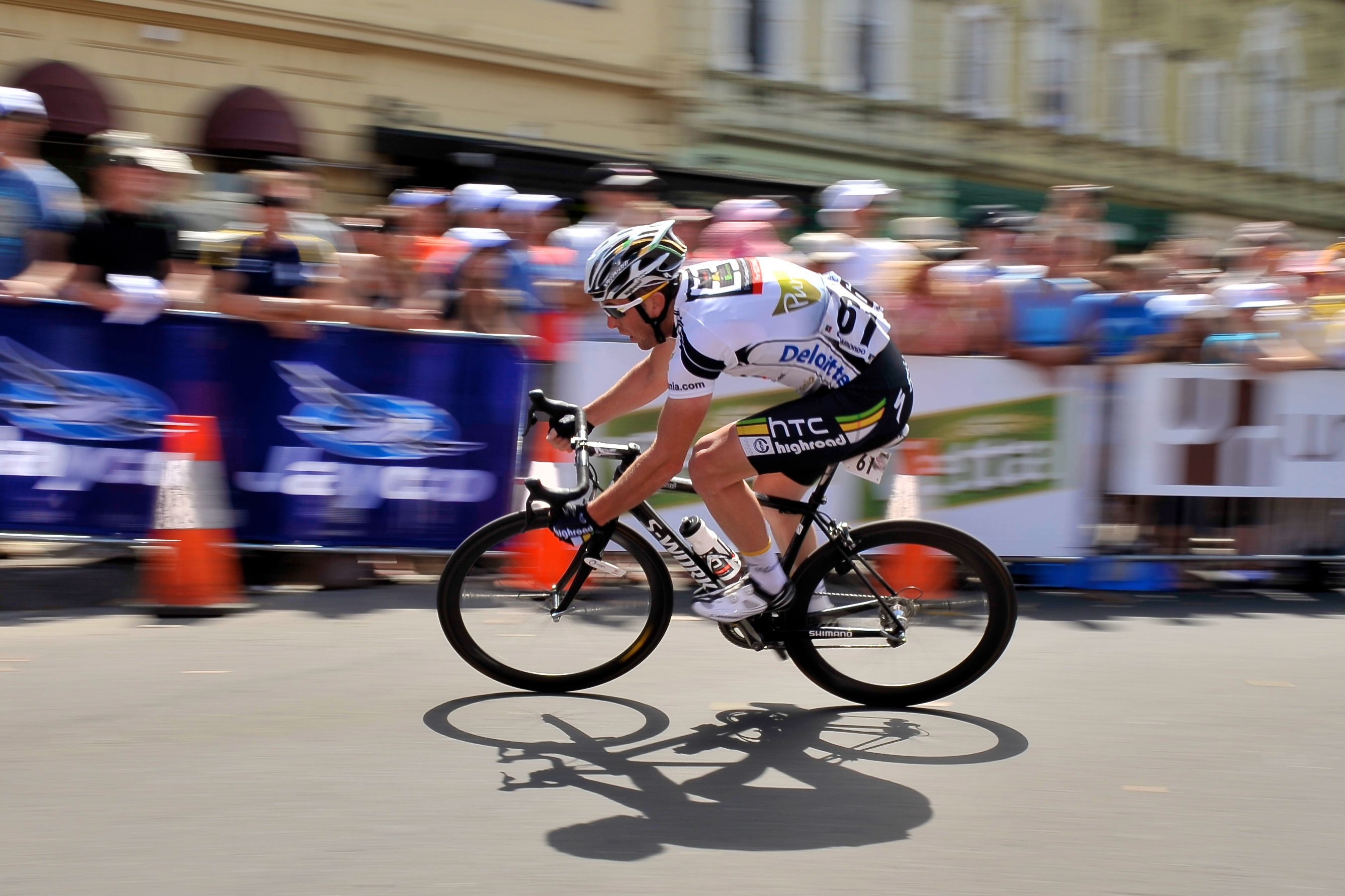
Goss at the 2011 Jayco Bay Cycling Classic, an event he would win.

=== 2010 ===
In 2010 he began with Team HTC–Columbia. On 16 May 2010 he won the ninth stage of the Giro d'Italia with arrival in Cave de Tirreni, but had to withdraw from the Giro on 23 May due to illness. In August he won the GP Ouest-France, beating Tyler Farrar in the sprint. He also claimed victory in America in the Philadelphia International Championship and a stage win at the Danmark Rundt.

=== 2011 ===
He began the 2011 season racing in Australia the Bay Classic Series, a criterium with a number of ranking points, winning the first and the fourth round and the final in an all Tasmanian team. He also came second in the National Championship. He continued his winning streak by winning the Cancer Council Classic, and met success in the Tour Down Under, winning the first stage, the points classification and finishing in second place overall. Then in the biggest win of his career, he won the 2011 Milan–San Remo Classic on Saturday 19 March. He succeeded in passing the ultimate climb of the day with the lead group and out-sprinted Fabian Cancellara of the Leopard Trek squad to take the victory.

On 6 September 2011, it was announced that Goss would be joining the GreenEDGE team for its inaugural season in 2012.

=== 2012 ===
In April, Goss took the points classification of the Tour of Turkey. He did not win a stage, but came close to it on Stage 4, where Mark Renshaw (Rabobank) edged him on the line by an extremely narrow margin.

He added a prestigious victory to his palmares at the Giro d'Italia, taking the third stage after Roberto Ferrari caused a crash that took down several riders in the finale, including Team Sky's Mark Cavendish. He withdrew from the Giro after taking the sixth place on Stage 13, explaining that he wanted to prepare himself properly for his two main objectives of the season, the Tour de France and the London Olympics' road race. Throughout La Grande Boucle, Goss would do battle with Liquigas–Cannondale's Peter Sagan for the Green jersey awarded to the best sprinter. However, his chances were greatly reduced in Stage 12 when he was handed a 30-point penalty for sprinting dangerously, touching Sagan after swerving several feet to his left while the two were going for the line. He finally took the third place of the points classification behind Sagan and André Greipel.

=== 2015 ===
On 18 September 2014 it was announced that Goss will be riding for Team MTN-Qhubeka in 2015.

=== 2016 ===
On 12 October 2015 it was announced that Goss would be moving to ONE Pro Cycling.

== Personal life ==
Goss supports the pivotal role of junior development and pathway program cycling teams in the state where he cultivated his cycling skills as a junior, and subsequently holds the title of adviser to the management committee and team ambassador for the RECAB cycling development team in Tasmania since 2009.

Goss appeared on billboards in Australia for Toshiba with teammates from the 2006 Commonwealth Games.

He lives and trains in Monte Carlo, Monaco.

== Major results ==
=== Road ===
2005
1st Stage 1 Tour of Japan
2006
1st Gran Premio della Liberazione
Vuelta a Navarra

1st Points classification
1st Stages 2 & 3

1st Stage 1 Giro delle Regioni
1st Stage 3 Baby Giro
2nd Trofeo Città di Brescia
2nd Coppa Città di Asti
2007 (1 pro win)
1st Stage 3 Tour of Britain
1st Eindhoven Team Time Trial
2nd Commerce Bank International Championship
3rd Delta Profronde
2008 (2)
Tour of Britain

1st Points classification
1st Stage 2

Herald Sun Tour

1st Points classification
1st Stage 1

3rd Kuurne–Brussels–Kuurne
2009 (3)
1st Paris–Brussels
Tour de Wallonie

1st Stages 3 & 5

2nd Grand Prix de Denain
3rd Gent–Wevelgem
10th Overall Vuelta a Murcia
2010 (4)
1st GP Ouest–France
1st Philadelphia International Championship
1st Stage 9 Giro d'Italia
1st Stage 1 Danmark Rundt
1st Stage 1 (TTT) Vuelta a España
2011 (5)
1st Overall Bay Classic Series

1st Stages 1 & 4

1st Milan–San Remo
1st Cancer Council Helpline Classic
1st Stage 3 Paris–Nice
1st Stage 8 Tour of California
1st Stage 2 Tour of Oman
2nd Road race, UCI World Championships
2nd Road race, National Championships
2nd Overall Tour Down Under

1st Sprints classification
1st Stage 1

8th London–Surrey Cycle Classic
2012 (1)
1st Stage 3 Giro d'Italia
1st Points classification, Tour of Turkey
1st Stage 1 (TTT) Tirreno–Adriatico
4th GP Ouest–France
2013 (1)
1st Stage 2 Tirreno–Adriatico
1st Stage 4 (TTT) Tour de France
2nd Cancer Council Helpline Classic
2014
1st Stage 2 Bay Classic Series

==== Grand Tour general classification results timeline ====
Grand Tour	2009	2010	2011	2012	2013
Giro d'Italia	126	DNF	—	DNF	DNF
Tour de France	—	—	140	120	152
Vuelta a España	—	138	DNF	—	—

Legend
DSQ	Disqualified
DNF	Did not finish

=== Track ===
2004
UCI World Junior Championships

1st Team pursuit
1st Madison (with Miles Olman)

2005
1st Team pursuit, National Championships
2006
1st Team pursuit, UCI World Championships
1st Team pursuit, National Championships
2nd Team pursuit, Commonwealth Games
