= Marco Marcato =

Road bicycle racer

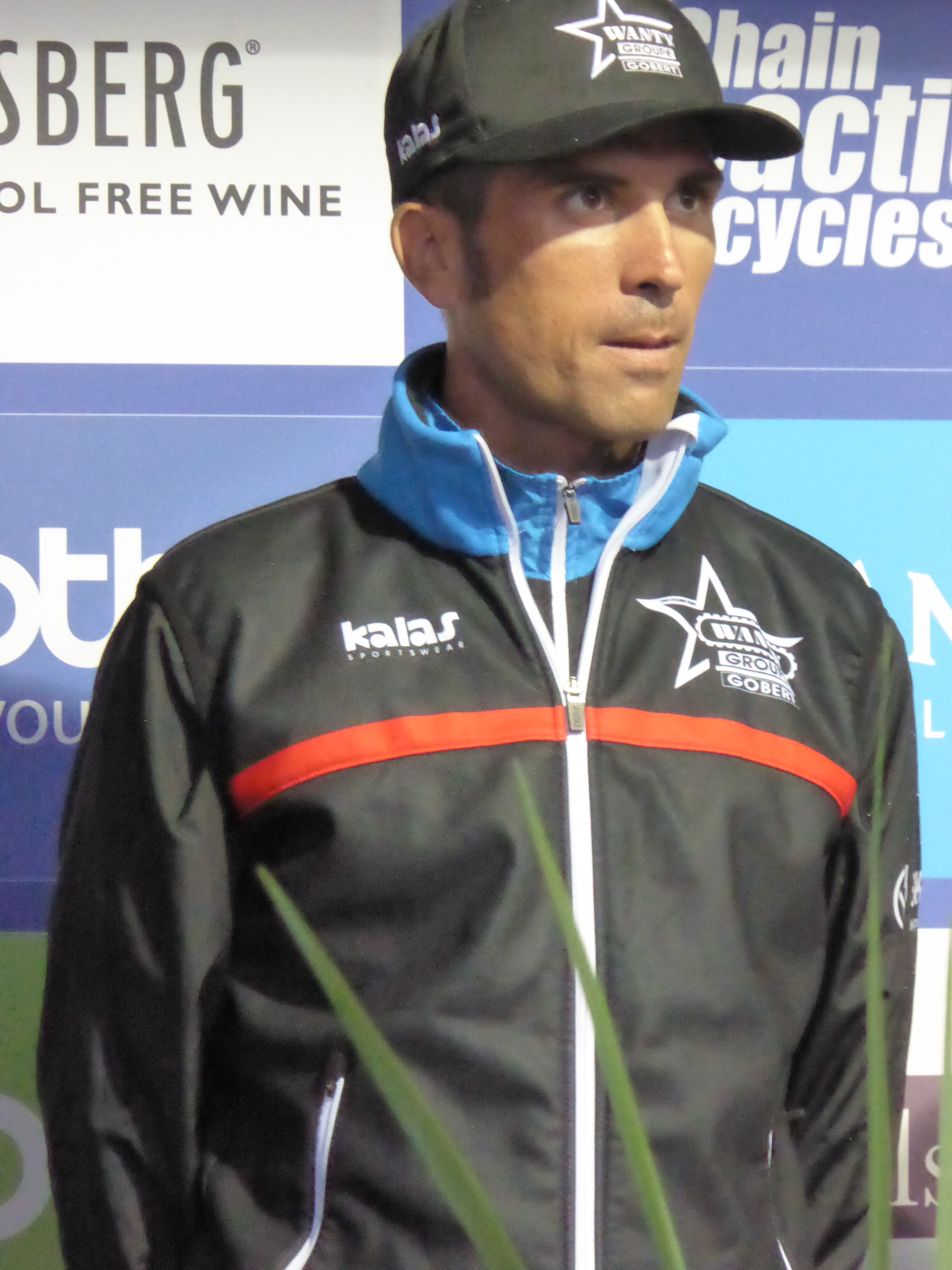
- Marcato at the 2016 Tour of Britain

Personal information
- Full name: Marco Marcato
- Born: 11 February 1984 (age 42) San Donà di Piave, Italy
- Height: 1.74 m (5 ft 8 1/2 in)
- Weight: 67 kg (148 lb; 10 st 8 lb)

Cycling career
- Sport: Cycling
- Current team: UAE Team Emirates XRG
- Discipline: Road
- Role: Rider
- Rider type: Sprinter; Classics specialist

Professional teams
- 2005–2006: Androni Giocattoli-3C Casalinghi
- 2007: Team LPR
- 2008: Cycle Collstrop
- 2009–2013: Vacansoleil
- 2014: Cannondale
- 2015–2016: Wanty–Groupe Gobert
- 2017–2021: UAE Abu Dhabi

Major wins
- One-day races and Classics Tour de Vendée (2011) Paris–Tours (2012)

Marco Marcato (born 11 February 1984) is an Italian former racing cyclist, who last rode for UCI WorldTeam UAE Team Emirates.

== Career ==
Born in San Donà di Piave, Veneto, Marcato won the Tour de Vendée in 2011, and Paris–Tours in 2012: in the latter of these he took the Ruban Jaune as the holder of the record for the fastest average speed in a race of over 200 kilometres (120 miles), at the time.

For the 2014 season, Marcato joined Cannondale, after his previous team – Vacansoleil–DCM – folded at the end of the 2013 season. Subsequently, Wanty–Groupe Gobert signed Marcato on a two-year contract from 2015, reuniting him with former Vacansoleil boss Hilaire Vanderschueren, and sharing leadership of the team in the Flemish classics with former Vacansoleil team-mate Björn Leukemans. In September 2016 it was announced that Marcato would join UAE Abu Dhabi for the 2017 season. He retired from competition at the end of the 2021 season.

== Major results ==
2005
1st Stage 2 Tour of Slovenia
7th Giro della Romagna
7th Gran Premio Città di Misano – Adriatico
7th Gran Premio Industria e Commercio di Prato
7th Giro del Piemonte
10th Memorial Cimurri
2006
1st Stage 4 Vuelta a Chihuahua
3rd Gran Premio Industria e Commercio di Prato
4th Coppa Bernocchi
5th Giro della Romagna
8th Overall Tour de Picardie
10th Gran Premio Città di Misano – Adriatico
2007
2nd Grand Prix Pino Cerami
2nd Giro della Romagna
5th Overall Circuit Franco-Belge
5th Giro di Toscana
6th Gran Premio Industria e Commercio di Prato
7th Overall Rheinland-Pfalz Rundfahrt
8th Clásica de Almería
10th Overall Tour of Ireland

1st Stage 5

2008
4th Overall Tour de Wallonie
6th Gran Premio Industria e Commercio Artigianato Carnaghese
2009
3rd Overall Tour de Luxembourg

1st Young rider classification

4th Paris–Camembert
6th Overall Tour of Belgium
7th Overall Tour de Picardie
8th Overall Tour de Pologne
2010
2nd Overall Tour de Wallonie
2nd Giro di Toscana
2nd Coppa Sabatini
2nd Druivenkoers Overijse
3rd Grand Prix Pino Cerami
4th Eschborn–Frankfurt City Loop
4th Memorial Marco Pantani
5th Overall Circuit Franco-Belge
5th Giro della Romagna
5th Grand Prix of Aargau Canton
6th Le Samyn
7th Giro del Veneto
8th Amstel Gold Race
9th E3 Prijs Vlaanderen
9th GP Ouest–France
10th Grote Prijs Stad Zottegem
10th Vattenfall Cyclassics
2011
1st Tour de Vendée
2nd Overall Étoile de Bessèges
2nd Paris–Tours
2nd Grand Prix Pino Cerami
3rd Overall Tour de Pologne
5th Druivenkoers Overijse
6th Dwars door Vlaanderen
6th Eschborn–Frankfurt City Loop
7th Grand Prix Cycliste de Montréal
8th Grand Prix Cycliste de Québec
10th Overall Circuit de Lorraine
2012
1st Paris–Tours
1st Stage 4 Étoile de Bessèges
2nd Grand Prix d'Ouverture La Marseillaise
3rd Overall Circuit de Lorraine
4th Druivenkoers Overijse
6th GP Ouest–France
6th Omloop Het Nieuwsblad
7th Gent–Wevelgem
8th Tour de Vendée
10th Grand Prix de Wallonie
2013
5th Overall Tour de Wallonie
5th Grote Prijs Stad Zottegem
6th Overall Tour de Luxembourg
6th Druivenkoers Overijse
2014
6th Overall Tour des Fjords
8th Trofeo Laigueglia
10th Overall Eneco Tour
2015
2nd Classic Loire Atlantique
2nd Druivenkoers Overijse
2nd Gran Premio Industria e Commercio di Prato
3rd Overall Danmark Rundt
5th Grote Prijs Jef Scherens
6th Grand Prix La Marseillaise
7th Tour de Vendée
2016
3rd Druivenkoers Overijse
5th Dwars door het Hageland
5th Grote Prijs Stad Zottegem
7th Overall Tour de Luxembourg
8th Trofeo Matteotti
9th Overall Danmark Rundt

=== Grand Tour general classification results timeline ===
Grand Tour	2009	2010	2011	2012	2013	2014	2015	2016	2017	2018	2019	2020
Giro d'Italia	—	—	—	—	75	—	—	—	113	69	99	—
Tour de France	—	—	87	67	—	80	—	—	96	126	—	111
Vuelta a España	DNF	—	—	—	—	—	—	—	—	—	DNF	—

Legend
—	Did not compete
DNF	Did not finish
