= De Rooij =

De Rooij or de Rooy is a Dutch surname meaning "the red one". People with this surname include:

- Gerard de Rooy (born 1980), Dutch truck racer, son of Jan
- Jan de Rooy (1943–2024), Dutch truck racer, father of Gerard
- Jan de Rooij (1932–2008), Dutch Olympic boxer
- Jessica de Rooij (born 1981), German film score composer
- Karel de Rooij (born 1946), Dutch cabaretier
- Nelly de Rooij (1883–1964), Dutch zoologist and herpetologist
- Theo de Rooij (born 1957), Dutch bicycle racer and directeur sportif
- Willem de Rooij (born 1969), Dutch film and installation artist

== See also ==
- De Roy, a French variant of the surname
