= 2010 E3 Prijs Vlaanderen =

Race details
- Dates: 27 March 2010
- Stages: 1
- Distance: 203 km (126 mi)
- Winning time: 4h 44' 34"

Results
	Winner	Fabian Cancellara (SUI)	(Team Saxo Bank)
	Second	Tom Boonen (BEL)	(Quick-Step)
	Third	Juan Antonio Flecha (ESP)	(Team Sky)

The 2010 E3 Prijs Vlaanderen was the 53rd edition of the E3 Harelbeke cycle race and was held on 27 March 2010. The race started and finished in Harelbeke. The race was won by Fabian Cancellara of Team Saxo Bank.

== General classification ==
Final general classification

Rank	Rider	Team	Time
1	Fabian Cancellara (SUI)	Team Saxo Bank	4h 44' 34"
2	Tom Boonen (BEL)	Quick-Step	+ 3"
3	Juan Antonio Flecha (ESP)	Team Sky	+ 3"
4	Filippo Pozzato (ITA)	Team Katusha	+ 50"
5	Lars Boom (NED)	Rabobank	+ 50"
6	Sebastian Langeveld (NED)	Rabobank	+ 50"
7	Björn Leukemans (BEL)	Vacansoleil	+ 50"
8	Paul Martens (GER)	Rabobank	+ 50"
9	Marco Marcato (ITA)	Vacansoleil	+ 58"
10	Fabio Felline (ITA)	Footon–Servetto–Fuji	+ 3' 16"
