= David Deroo =

French cyclist

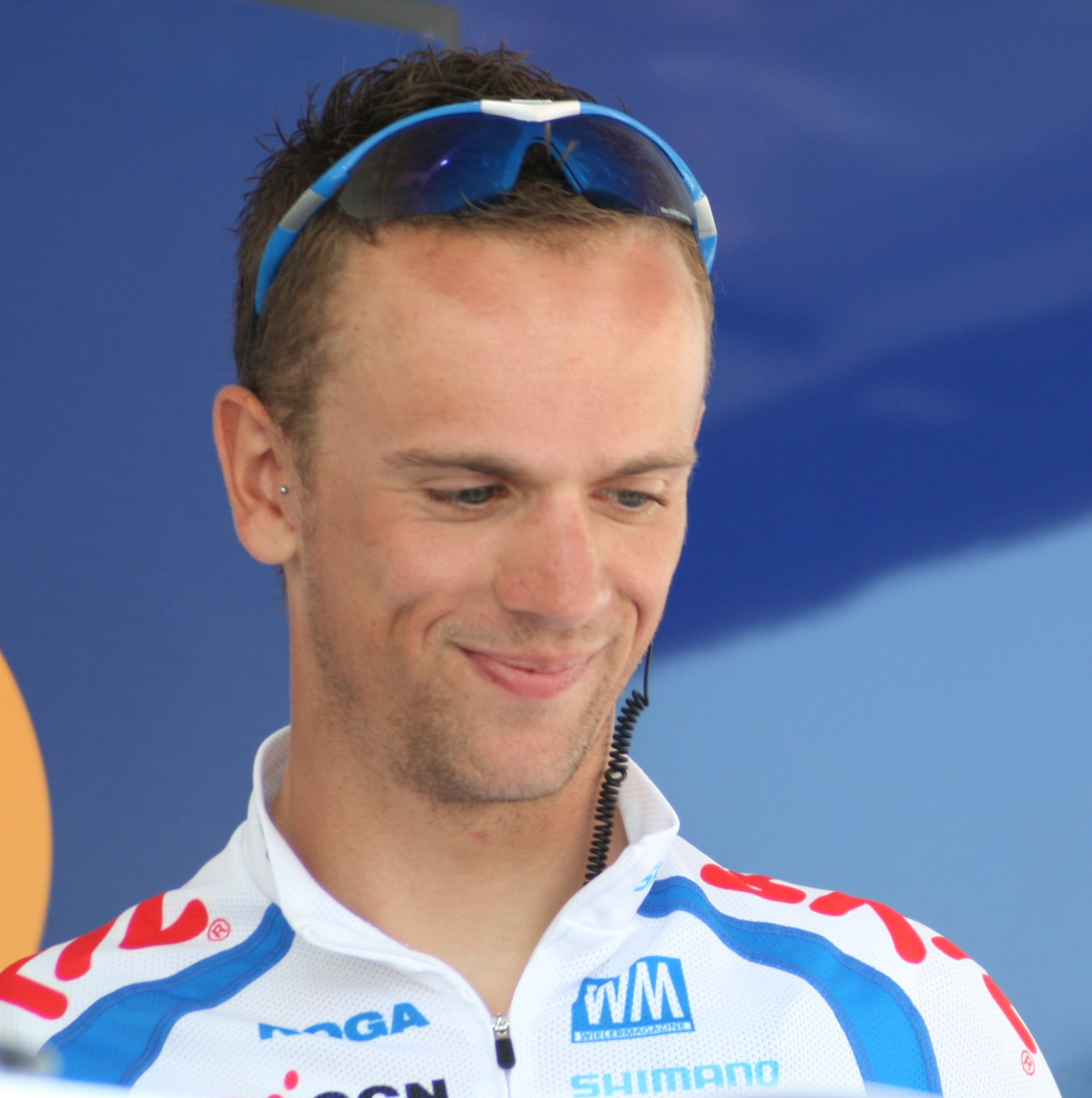

Personal information
- Born: 11 March 1985 (age 41) Roubaix, France

Cycling career
- Sport: Cycling
- Current team: Retired
- Discipline: Road
- Role: Rider

Amateur teams
- 2004–2006: VC Roubaix Lille Métropole
- 2011: ESEG Douai

Professional teams
- 2006: Skil–Shimano (stagiaire)
- 2007–2010: Skil–Shimano

David Deroo (born 11 March 1985 in Roubaix) is a French former racing cyclist.

== Major results ==
2002
10th Flanders-Europe Classic
2003
2nd Paris–Roubaix Juniors
2005
2nd Grand Prix Bavay
2006
1st Stage 6 Tour de Bretagne
9th Overall Circuit des Ardennes
