= 2011 in men's road cycling =

== World Championships ==
The World Road championships were held in Copenhagen, Denmark.

Race	Date	Winner	Second	Third
World Championship Time Trial	September 21	Tony Martin (GER)	Bradley Wiggins (GBR)	Fabian Cancellara (SUI)
World Championship Road Race	September 25	Mark Cavendish (GBR)	Matthew Goss (AUS)	André Greipel (GER)

== Grand Tours ==
Race	Date	Winner	Second	Third
(Italy) Giro d'Italia	May 7–29	Michele Scarponi (ITA)	Vincenzo Nibali (ITA)	John Gadret (FRA)
Tour de France	July 2–24	Cadel Evans (AUS)	Andy Schleck (LUX)	Fränk Schleck (LUX)
(Spain) Vuelta a España	August 20 – September 11	Juan José Cobo (ESP)	Chris Froome (GBR)	Bradley Wiggins (GBR)

== UCI WorldTour ==
Race	Date	Winner	Second	Third
(Australia) Santos Tour Down Under	January 18–23	Cameron Meyer (AUS)	Matthew Goss (AUS)	Ben Swift (GBR)
(France) Paris–Nice	March 6–13	Tony Martin (GER)	Andreas Klöden (GER)	Bradley Wiggins (GBR)
(Italy) Tirreno–Adriatico	March 9–15	Cadel Evans (AUS)	Robert Gesink (NED)	Michele Scarponi (ITA)
(Italy) Milano–Sanremo	March 19	Matthew Goss (AUS)	Fabian Cancellara (SUI)	Philippe Gilbert (BEL)
(Spain) Volta Ciclista a Catalunya	March 21–27	Alberto Contador (ESP)	Michele Scarponi (ITA)	Dan Martin (IRL)
(Belgium) Gent–Wevelgem	March 27	Tom Boonen (BEL)	Daniele Bennati (ITA)	Tyler Farrar (USA)
(Belgium) Ronde van Vlaanderen / Tour des Flandres	April 3	Nick Nuyens (BEL)	Sylvain Chavanel (FRA)	Fabian Cancellara (SUI)
(Spain) Tour of the Basque Country	April 4–9	Andreas Klöden (GER)	Chris Horner (USA)	Robert Gesink (NED)
(France) Paris–Roubaix	April 10	Johan Vansummeren (BEL)	Fabian Cancellara (SUI)	Maarten Tjallingii (NED)
(Netherlands) Amstel Gold Race	April 17	Philippe Gilbert (BEL)	Joaquim Rodríguez (ESP)	Simon Gerrans (AUS)
(Belgium) La Flèche Wallonne	April 20	Philippe Gilbert (BEL)	Joaquim Rodríguez (ESP)	Samuel Sánchez (ESP)
(Belgium) Liège–Bastogne–Liège	April 24	Philippe Gilbert (BEL)	Fränk Schleck (LUX)	Andy Schleck (LUX)
(Switzerland) Tour de Romandie	April 26 – May 1	Cadel Evans (AUS)	Tony Martin (GER)	Alexander Vinokourov (KAZ)
(France) Critérium du Dauphiné	June 5–12	Bradley Wiggins (GBR)	Cadel Evans (AUS)	Alexander Vinokourov (KAZ)
(Switzerland) Tour de Suisse	June 11–19	Levi Leipheimer (USA)	Damiano Cunego (ITA)	Steven Kruijswijk (NED)
(Spain) Clásica de San Sebastián	July 30	Philippe Gilbert (BEL)	Carlos Barredo (ESP)	Greg Van Avermaet (BEL)
(Poland) Tour de Pologne	July 31 – August 6	Peter Sagan (SVK)	Dan Martin (IRL)	Marco Marcato (ITA)
(Belgium) (Netherlands) Eneco Tour	August 8–14	Edvald Boasson Hagen (NOR)	Philippe Gilbert (BEL)	David Millar (GBR)
(Germany) Vattenfall Cyclassics	August 21	Edvald Boasson Hagen (NOR)	Gerald Ciolek (GER)	Borut Božič (SLO)
GP Ouest-France	August 28	Grega Bole (SLO)	Simon Gerrans (AUS)	Thomas Voeckler (FRA)
(Canada) GP de Québec	September 9	Philippe Gilbert (BEL)	Robert Gesink (NED)	Rigoberto Urán (COL)
(Canada) GP de Montréal	September 11	Rui Costa (POR)	Pierrick Fédrigo (FRA)	Philippe Gilbert (BEL)
(China) Tour of Beijing	October 5–9	Tony Martin (GER)	David Millar (GBR)	Chris Froome (GBR)
(Italy) Giro di Lombardia	October 15	Oliver Zaugg (SUI)	Dan Martin (IRE)	Joaquim Rodríguez (ESP)

== 2.HC Category Races ==
Race	Date	Winner	Second	Third
(Malaysia) Le Tour de Langkawi	January 23 – February 1	Jonathan Monsalve (VEN)	Libardo Niño (COL)	Emanuele Sella (ITA)
(France) Critérium International	March 26–27	Fränk Schleck (LUX)	Vasil Kiryienka (BLR)	Rein Taaramäe (EST)
(Belgium) Three Days of De Panne	March 29–31	Sébastien Rosseler (BEL)	Lieuwe Westra (NED)	Michał Kwiatkowski (POL)
(Italy) Giro del Trentino	April 19–22	Michele Scarponi (ITA)	Tiago Machado (POR)	Luca Ascani (ITA)
Presidential Tour of Turkey	April 24 – May 1	Alexander Efimkin (RUS)	Andrey Zeits (KAZ)	Thibaut Pinot (FRA)
(France) Four Days of Dunkirk	May 4–8	Thomas Voeckler (FRA)	Laurent Pichon (FRA)	Zdeněk Štybar (CZE)
(United States) Tour of California	May 15–22	Chris Horner (USA)	Levi Leipheimer (USA)	Tom Danielson (USA)
(Germany) Bayern-Rundfahrt	May 25–29	Geraint Thomas (GBR)	Nicki Sørensen (DEN)	Michael Albasini (SUI)
Tour of Belgium	May 25–29	Philippe Gilbert (BEL)	Greg Van Avermaet (BEL)	Björn Leukemans (BEL)
Tour of Luxembourg	June 1–5	Linus Gerdemann (GER)	Alexandre Geniez (FRA)	Tony Gallopin (FRA)
(China) Tour of Qinghai Lake	July 1–10	Gregor Gazvoda (SLO)	Dmitriy Gruzdev (KAZ)	Mateusz Taciak (POL)
Tour of Austria	July 3–10	Fredrik Kessiakoff (SWE)	Leopold König (CZE)	Carlos Sastre (ESP)
(Belgium) Tour de Wallonie	July 23–27	Greg Van Avermaet (BEL)	Joost van Leijen (NED)	Ben Hermans (BEL)
(Denmark) Danmark Rundt	August 3–7	Simon Gerrans (AUS)	Daniele Bennati (ITA)	Michael Mørkøv (DEN)
(Spain) Vuelta a Burgos	August 3–7	Joaquim Rodríguez (ESP)	Daniel Moreno (ESP)	Juan José Cobo (ESP)
(France) Tour du Limousin	August 16–19	Björn Leukemans (BEL)	Mathieu Ladagnous (FRA)	Florian Guillou (FRA)
(China) Tour of Hainan	October 20–28	Valentin Iglinsky (KAZ)	Reinardt Janse van Rensburg (RSA)	Alexander Schmitt (GER)

== 1.HC Category Races ==
Race	Date	Winner	Second	Third
(Belgium) Omloop Het Nieuwsblad Elite	February 26	Sebastian Langeveld (NED)	Juan Antonio Flecha (ESP)	Mathew Hayman (AUS)
(Belgium) E3 Prijs Vlaanderen – Harelbeke	March 26	Fabian Cancellara (SUI)	Jürgen Roelandts (BEL)	Vladimir Gusev (RUS)
(Spain) Gran Premio Miguel Induráin	April 2	Samuel Sánchez (ESP)	Alexandr Kolobnev (RUS)	Fabian Wegmann (GER)
(Belgium) Scheldeprijs	April 6	Mark Cavendish (GBR)	Denis Galimzyanov (RUS)	Yauheni Hutarovich (BLR)
(Belgium) Brabantse Pijl	April 13	Philippe Gilbert (BEL)	Björn Leukemans (BEL)	Anthony Geslin (FRA)
(Germany) Eschborn–Frankfurt City Loop	May 5	John Degenkolb (GER)	Jérôme Baugnies (BEL)	Michael Matthews (AUS)
(United States) TD Bank International Cycling Championship	June 5	Alex Rasmussen (DEN)	Peter Sagan (SLO)	Robert Förster (GER)
(Italy) Tre Valli Varesine	August 16	Davide Rebellin (ITA)	Domenico Pozzovivo (ITA)	Thibaut Pinot (FRA)
(France) (Belgium) Paris–Brussels	September 10	Denis Galimzyanov (RUS)	Yauheni Hutarovich (BLR)	Anthony Ravard (FRA)
(France) GP du Fourmies	September 11	Guillaume Blot (FRA)	Alexander Kristoff (NOR)	Stefan van Dijk (NED)
(France) Tour de Vendée	October 2	Marco Marcato (ITA)	Pello Bilbao (ESP)	Maxime Bouet (FRA)
(Italy) Giro dell'Emilia	October 8	Carlos Betancur (COL)	Bauke Mollema (NED)	Rigoberto Urán (COL)
(France) Paris–Tours	October 9	Greg Van Avermaet (BEL)	Marco Marcato (ITA)	Kasper Klostergaard (DEN)
(Italy) Giro del Piemonte	October 13	Daniel Moreno (ESP)	Greg Van Avermaet (BEL)	Luca Paolini (ITA)

== UCI tours ==
Tour	Individual champion	Individual champion's team	Team champion	Nations champion
World Tour	Philippe Gilbert (BEL)	Omega Pharma–Lotto	Omega Pharma–Lotto	Belgium
Africa Tour	Adil Jelloul (MAR)	None	Groupement Sportif Petrolier Algérie	Morocco
America Tour	Miguel Ubeto (VEN)	None	EPM–UNE	Colombia
Asia Tour	Mehdi Sohrabi (IRI)	Tabriz Petrochemical Cycling Team	Tabriz Petrochemical Cycling Team	Iran
Europe Tour	Giovanni Visconti (ITA)	Farnese Vini–Neri Sottoli	FDJ	Italy
Oceania Tour	Richard Lang (AUS)	Team Jayco–AIS	Team Jayco–AIS	Australia

== See also ==
- 2011 in women's road cycling
