= 2011 HTC–Highroad season =

2011 HTC–Highroad season
Manager	Bob Stapleton
One-day victories	6
Stage race overall victories	4
Stage race stage victories	37
Previous season

The 2011 season for HTC–Highroad began in January at the Tour Down Under and ended in October at the Chrono des Nations. As a UCI ProTeam, they were automatically invited and obligated to send a squad to every event in the UCI World Tour. This was the team's final season, as they failed to secure a new title sponsor.

As they had been in previous years, HTC-Highroad was again the most successful team in 2011, claiming 47 victories. Among them were six stage wins at the Tour de France, including five by Mark Cavendish. While Cavendish had won no fewer than four stages in each of the previous four Tours, the 2011 Tour was the first in which he won the points classification green jersey. Tony Martin added a time trial win, something he also did at the Vuelta a España and five other races on the season. While they were not under the auspices of HTC-Highroad, Cavendish and Martin both claimed world championship titles in their respective disciplines at the 2011 UCI Road World Championships as well.

The team's success was widespread. Along with Cavendish and Martin, Matthew Goss, Mark Renshaw, John Degenkolb, and Michael Albasini each won multiple races as well. Five other riders took a single win, along with the squad's victory in the team time trial stage of the Giro d'Italia. Goss' Milan–San Remo triumph was the team's strongest result in the spring classics season.

== 2011 roster ==
Ages as of January 1, 2011.

Rider	Date of birth
Michael Albasini (SUI)	December 20, 1980 (aged 30)
Lars Bak (DEN)	January 16, 1980 (aged 30)
Matt Brammeier (IRE)	June 7, 1985 (aged 25)
Mark Cavendish (GBR)	May 21, 1985 (aged 25)
John Degenkolb (GER)	January 7, 1989 (aged 21)
Zak Dempster (Note: Rider joined the team on August 1 as a stagiaire.) (AUS)	September 27, 1987 (aged 23)
Bernhard Eisel (AUT)	February 17, 1981 (aged 29)
Caleb Fairly (USA)	February 19, 1987 (aged 23)
Jan Ghyselinck (BEL)	February 24, 1988 (aged 22)
Matthew Goss (AUS)	November 5, 1986 (aged 24)
Bert Grabsch (GER)	June 19, 1975 (aged 35)
Patrick Gretsch (GER)	April 17, 1987 (aged 23)
Leigh Howard (AUS)	October 18, 1989 (aged 21)
Craig Lewis (USA)	January 10, 1985 (aged 25)

Rider	Date of birth
Tony Martin (GER)	April 23, 1985 (aged 25)
Lachlan Norris (AUS)	January 21, 1987 (aged 23)
Danny Pate (USA)	March 23, 1979 (aged 31)
Marco Pinotti (ITA)	February 25, 1976 (aged 34)
František Raboň (CZE)	September 26, 1983 (aged 27)
Alex Rasmussen (Note: Rasmussen's contract was terminated by the team on September 15 due to him missing a doping control) (DEN)	June 9, 1984 (aged 26)
Mark Renshaw (AUS)	October 22, 1982 (aged 28)
Hayden Roulston (NZL)	January 10, 1981 (aged 29)
Kanstantsin Sivtsov (BLR)	August 9, 1982 (aged 28)
Gatis Smukulis (LAT)	April 15, 1987 (aged 23)
Tejay van Garderen (USA)	August 12, 1988 (aged 22)
Martin Velits (SVK)	February 21, 1985 (aged 25)
Peter Velits (SVK)	February 21, 1985 (aged 25)

Riders who joined the team for the 2011 season

Rider	2010 team
Matt Brammeier	An Post–Sean Kelly
John Degenkolb	neo-pro
Caleb Fairly	stagiaire (Garmin–Transitions)
Danny Pate	Garmin–Transitions
Alex Rasmussen	Team Saxo Bank
Gatis Smukulis	Ag2r–La Mondiale

Riders who left the team during or after the 2010 season

Rider	2011 team
Gert Dockx	Omega Pharma–Lotto
André Greipel	Omega Pharma–Lotto
Rasmus Guldhammer	Team Concordia Forsikring-Himmerland
Adam Hansen	Omega Pharma–Lotto
Maxime Monfort	Leopard Trek
Vicente Reynès	Omega Pharma–Lotto
Michael Rogers	Team Sky
Aleksejs Saramotins	Cofidis
Marcel Sieberg	Omega Pharma–Lotto

== One-day races ==
Before the spring season and the races known as "classics" began, Goss was victorious in the first race of the season run under the auspices of UCI ProTeams, the Cancer Council Helpline Classic. Avoiding a crash by Team Sky's Greg Henderson, the defending champion, Goss finished the 51 kilometers (32 mi) criterium first ahead of teammate Renshaw and Team RadioShack's Robbie McEwen. Cavendish also rode this race, but finished 30 seconds back. The team was also active at the Vuelta a Mallorca series of single-day races. Degenkolb and Howard rounded out the podium at the Trofeo Cala Millor, finishing just behind the day's winner Tyler Farrar in a photo finish to a 23-rider sprint. Martin took fifth two days later at the Trofeo Deià, turning in an uncharacteristically strong sprint near the front of a 34-rider group. On the last day in Majorca, Degenkolb managed tenth place in the Trofeo Magaluf-Palmanova.

=== Spring classics ===
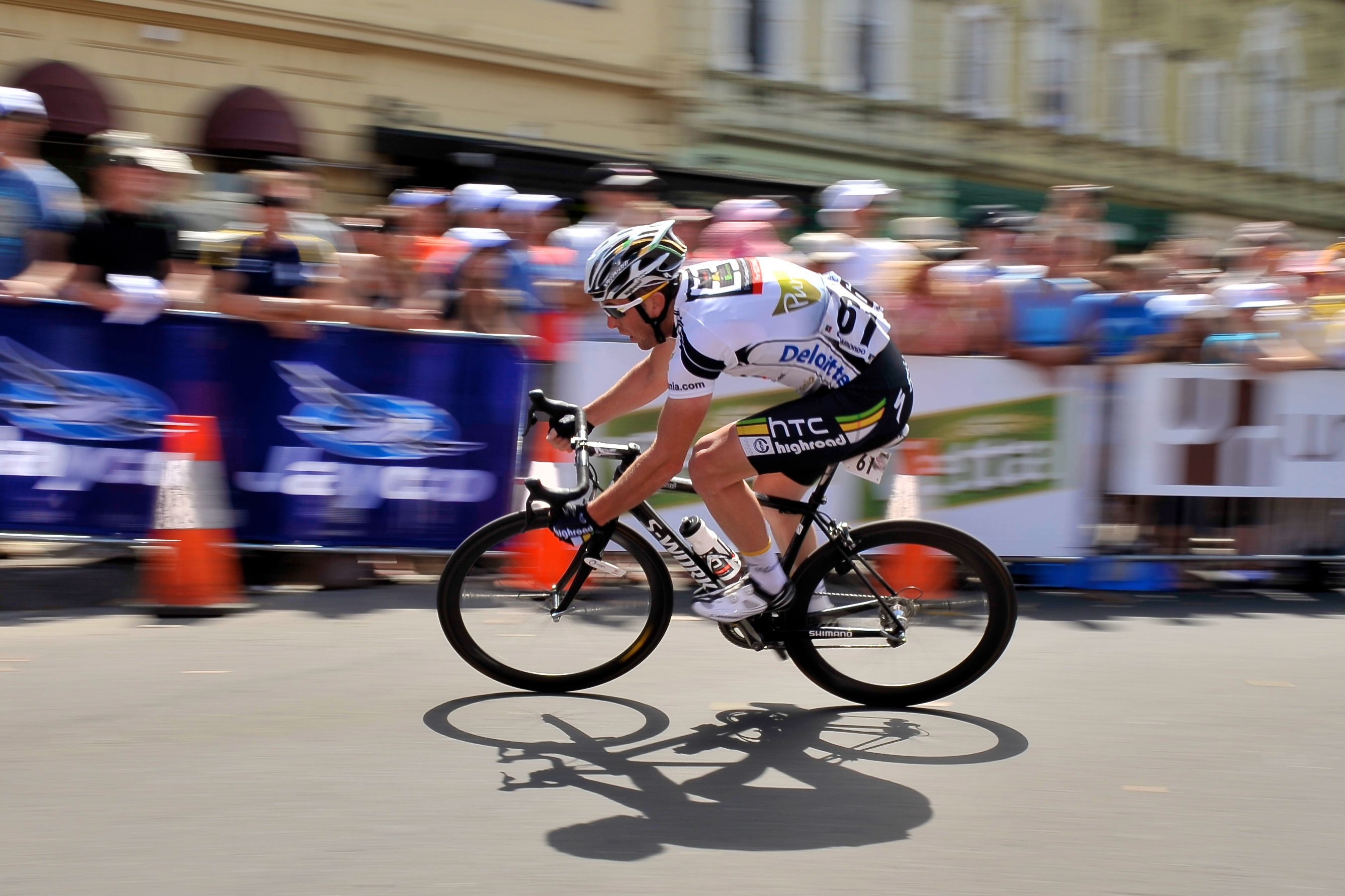
Matthew Goss had already had a successful early season prior to Milan–San Remo, and took the biggest win of his career at the Italian monument.

At the first monument race of the season, Milan–San Remo, the team came in thinking they had two options for the victory – 2009 winner Cavendish, and the 2011 season's most prolific winner to date Goss. Sporting director Valerio Piva stated that if the race came down to a large field sprint, as it often does, the team's focus would be Cavendish. For the second year in a row, Cavendish had had a slow start to his season, but stated that he felt he was on good form heading into Milan–San Remo. The race turned out to be atypical of how Milan–San Remo usually plays out. A crash occurred 90 kilometers (56 mi) from the finish of the 298 kilometers (185 mi) day on Le Manie, one of several small climbs in the profile. This allowed some 45 riders who had been ahead of world champion Thor Hushovd, the man who crashed, to speed clear of the rest of the main field. They quickly took a two-minute advantage and, working cohesively, never gave it up. Goss was the only HTC-Highroad rider to make the split, but his teammates, including Cavendish, who had been caught behind obligingly did nothing to help pull the second group up to the first. Goss effectively stayed in the slipstream of riders like Vincenzo Nibali and Philippe Gilbert, and stayed with the first group on the road over the Poggio where other sprinters like Tom Boonen, Alessandro Petacchi, and Heinrich Haussler were unable, despite having made the 45-rider selection earlier in the day. In the finale, eight riders representing eight different teams approached the finish line together. Since no one had a teammate to perform a proper leadout, the final meters were somewhat strange, as the eight riders continually looked around to see who would open up the sprint. Finally, Nibali, Gilbert, and Yoann Offredo did so, but they effectively performed a leadout for Goss, who came around them at the very end of the race for the victory. Goss was the first Australian rider ever to win the race. Afterward, Cavendish stated that he had been feeling ill on the day the race was run, and that even if he had not been caught behind the crash on Le Manie, he would not have had the form to put in a successful sprint. He said he was happy for his teammate's winning effort. The team had hoped to ride for Cavendish at Gent–Wevelgem in March, but repeated mechanical trouble and also a crash left him well short of figuring into the finale. Former Gent–Wevelgem winner Eisel was able to salvage the team's fortunes somewhat by finishing seventh on the day. In April, as the spring season was reaching its height, Cavendish took his third career win at the Scheldeprijs. The Manxman avoided a crash on the final finishing straight, one that doomed the chances for his chief rival Tyler Farrar, and was easily the best sprinter of the 31 riders who finished together at the head of the race.

At the third monument, Paris–Roubaix, the squad was one of only two (Garmin–Cervélo being the other) to have three finishers in the top 20. Degenkolb joined a breakaway group that formed right about when the first cobbled sectors began. Later, around the Arenberg sector, Bak joined a chase group that bridged up to the leaders. He stayed at the front of the race for nearly its entire remainder, fading slightly at the end to finish fifth. Degenkolb was one of the many riders caught by a surging Fabian Cancellara toward the finish, hanging on for 19th place. Also, Eisel rode most of the race with the favorites like Cancellara and Thor Hushovd, and followed their accelerations toward the finish, taking seventh. Post-race analysis praised the team's strong effort after a disappointing Tour of Flanders, when they had no rider figure into the finale. At the Grand Prix de Denain later in April, Howard narrowly missed the podium by finishing fourth in the field sprint.

The team also sent squads to Omloop Het Nieuwsblad, Kuurne–Brussels–Kuurne, Le Samyn, Montepaschi Strade Bianche, Nokere Koerse, Dwars door Vlaanderen, the Tour of Flanders, Brabantse Pijl, the Amstel Gold Race, La Flèche Wallonne, Liège–Bastogne–Liège, and the inaugural ProRace Berlin, but finished no higher than 11th in any of these races.

=== Fall races ===
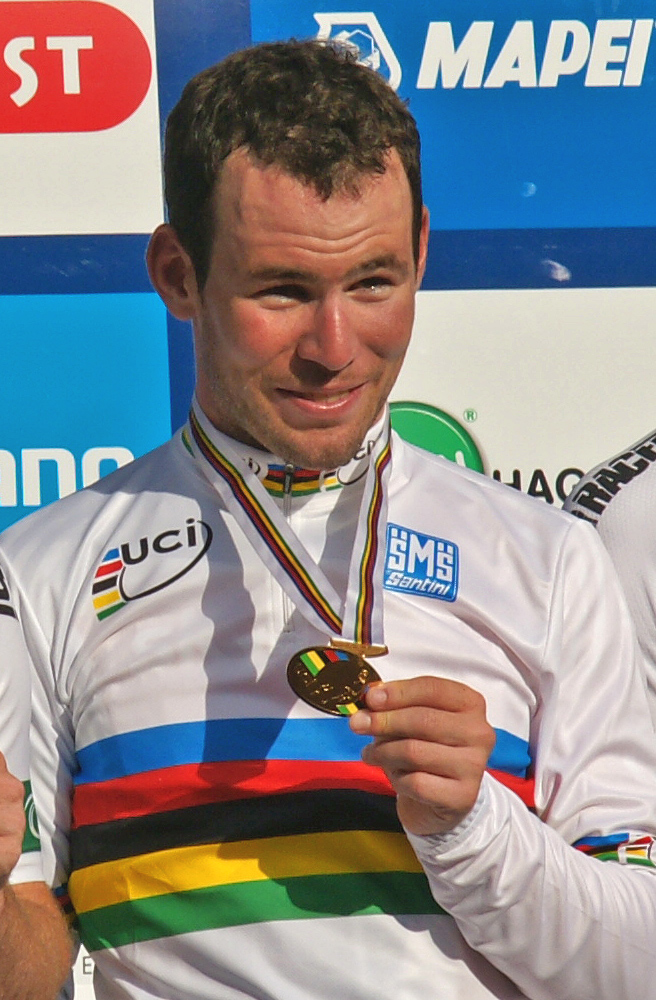
Mark Cavendish upon receiving the rainbow jersey for the first time. He debuted the jersey for HTC-Highroad in two single-day races in the fall, though he was not competitive in either.

The team's fall performances were perhaps subdued by the news of their impending collapse being confirmed in early August. It was not until October, at Paris–Bourges that the team came relatively close to another victory. Degenkolb took fourth place in a hectic that resulted in the peloton being split into several groups. The team had a bittersweet joy later that same week at Paris–Tours, as it was there that Cavendish debuted his newly won world championship rainbow jersey, in one of the few occasions he would wear it as a member of this team. With a late attack by BMC Racing Team's Greg Van Avermaet keeping the expected bunch finish from happening, the team's best-placed man on the day was Degenkolb in 11th; Cavendish was 42nd, coming in towards the back of the first large group on the road. Cavendish also rode in the rainbow jersey at the Giro del Piemonte, but did not complete the race. The team's best-placed rider that day was trainee rider Zakkari Dempster, well down in 65th position.

The team then decided against sending Cavendish to the fall monument, the Giro di Lombardia. Its profile, even hillier than the Giro del Piemonte, meant it was unlikely that Cavendish would finish that race either. Sporting director Valerio Piva explained that having Cavendish start that race only to pull out after riding for an hour would be disrespectful to Cavendish, the rainbow jersey, and the race itself. The squad therefore sent only six riders to the race instead of the customary nine, and Sivtsov in 43rd place was the only classified finisher. The next day, Martin took the team's final victory in their history at the Chrono des Nations single-day time trial. It was perhaps the most dominant victory of Martin's career, with no rider coming inside two minutes of his winning time. Coincidentally, Amber Neben of the women's HTC-Highroad team also took victory at this event, closing the team's history with double success.

The team also sent squads to the Clásica de San Sebastián, the GP Ouest-France, the Grand Prix Cycliste de Québec, the Grand Prix Cycliste de Montréal, the Championship of Flanders, and the Grand Prix d'Isbergues, but finished no higher than 18th in any of these races.

== Stage races ==
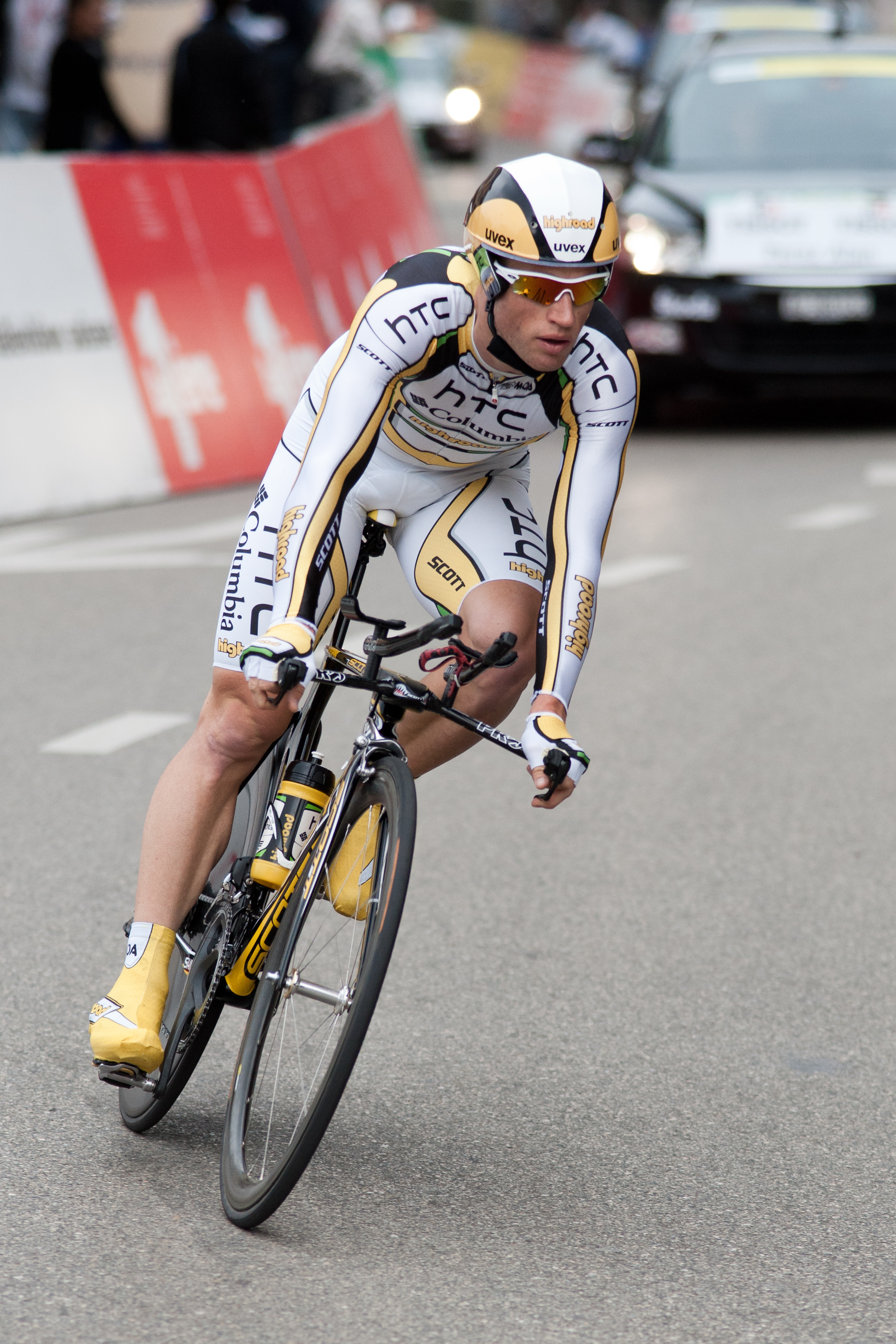
Mark Renshaw won a stage and the overall in the Tour of Qatar.

Despite losing defending champion André Greipel to Omega Pharma–Lotto in the offseason, they came to the Tour Down Under expecting to contend for overall victory. Sprinters Cavendish, Eisel, Goss, Roulston, and Renshaw were all part of the squad, though no leader was chosen ahead of time. Goss won the field sprint finish to the first stage, finishing just ahead of Greipel in second. He stated after the stage that the plan was for him to lead Cavendish out and win if able, or for Cavendish to come around him and open up a time gap if he were able. Cavendish was 62nd on the day. Numerous crashes in stage 2 thinned the number of riders present to try for the stage win. Goss and Cavendish both fell, though they were credited with the same finishing time as the leading group since the crashes took place within 3 kilometers (1.9 mi) of the finish line. Cavendish required several stitches after the stage. Time bonuses involving Goss, stage 2 winner Ben Swift, and Robbie McEwen meant all had the same time going into stage 3, but McEwen got the ochre jersey. Goss got a time bonus the next day, for third, and retook the race lead. Stage 4 featured a surprise, as the peloton ceded 24 seconds at the finish to a breakaway group including Garmin–Cervélo's Cameron Meyer, who became the new race leader. While Goss took bonus seconds in both stage 5 and stage 6, it was not enough, as he came up two seconds short of Meyer in the final overall classification. Goss was second overall, and winner of the points classification.

In February, the team attended the Tour of Qatar with another sprinter-heavy squad, featuring Cavendish, Renshaw, and Eisel. Cavendish quickly lost out at any overall contention, losing twelve and a half minutes after a crash in stage 1, but Renshaw finished near the front of the race in each of the first three road race stages and occupied second overall after stage 3. Stage 4 featured a selective final sprint, as only 11 riders finished together at the front of the race. Renshaw won this stage ahead of Daniele Bennati and Tom Boonen, and gained the overall race lead with the time bonus. Renshaw was a distant 17th in the final stage, but since second place man Heinrich Haussler failed to win any bonus time, Renshaw won the overall classification with this performance. It was the first stage race win of Renshaw's career, and he explained after the race that the squad had hoped to ride for Cavendish in the event, but that his second major crash in as many events made them change their plans. The team's successes continued at events later in February. Goss confirmed his early-season form by winning stage 2 of the Tour of Oman in a small sprint. He was one of a handful of sprinters who had stayed with the front group over a short, steep climb in the middle of the course, with Cavendish among the others left over ten minutes behind. Four days later, Cavendish picked up his first win of the year, in a more traditional field sprint. At the concurrent Volta ao Algarve, neo-pro sprinter Degenkolb won stage 2 over Tyler Farrar and Michael Matthews, who took a one-second gap over the rest of the field in their sprint. In the overall classification, Martin stayed close behind overall leader Steven Cummings, trailing by ten seconds with the individual time trial stage remaining to close out the race. Martin won the time trial, and Cummings and previously second placed man Alberto Contador finished well down, giving Martin the overall race win as well as the stage. Degenkolb added a second victory for his neo-pro season at the Three Days of West Flanders race, winning a full field sprint to finish off the first road race stage.

The team's winning ways continued at Paris–Nice in March. Goss won the field sprint finish to stage 3, after narrowly missing a victory in stage 2, maneuvering around riders who fell after Liquigas–Cannondale's Peter Sagan crashed on the course's final sharp turn. In the mountainous stage 5, Martin finished with the first group on the road to assume fourth place at the end of the day, ten seconds down on race leader Andreas Klöden. This was an advantageous position with the stage 6 individual time trial to come; Martin was viewed as a favorite for the time trial. The next day, Martin handily won the time trial, with only five riders finishing within a minute of his winning time. He took the race lead, with a 36-second lead over Klöden in the overall standings. His advantage largely held steady over the last two days, giving him the overall race crown. The team won the flat first stage of the Volta a Catalunya, but not in the manner by which they regularly win flat stages. New acquisition Smukulis made the morning breakaway and had it stick to the finish. Last shedding former teammate Ben Gastauer of Ag2r–La Mondiale, Smukulis soloed to victory 28 seconds ahead of the charging peloton. It was his first professional victory, and he was visibly emotional as he crossed the finish line. He held the race lead for a second day before giving it up on the high mountain stage 3, as he lost nearly 17 minutes that day. At the Tour of the Basque Country, Albasini won the mountains classification thanks to back-to-back nearly day-long efforts in the breakaways in stages 4 and 5. Also, Martin won the time trial which closed out the event, again besting Klöden, though this time the elder German was the overall race winner. The team was successful on two fronts at the Tour of California. Van Garderen showed solid climbing legs on the race's two summit finishes. Though he was more than a minute back of the stage winner both days, he was well better than the majority of the field, including all his rivals for the youth classification. He won the award at the end of the race by almost six minutes over Garmin–Cervélo's Andrew Talansky. The last stage featured a group sprint finish. Where their leadout train had been outmaneuvered by Team Sky's earlier in the race, this time Goss was successfully delivered to the line first. Van Garderen's final overall placing was fifth. Degenkolb and Albasini both found their way into the winner's circle at Bayern-Rundfahrt. First, Degenkolb edged out fellow young German sprinter Marcel Kittel in the finish to stage 2. Albasini won a breakaway sprint the next day, best of a nine-man group. This win gave him the race lead for a day, and he held on to finish on the event's final podium in third place.

The team took multiple wins at the Critérium du Dauphiné in June. Degenkolb won the selective stage 2 sprint that was raced so fast, the first 14 riders gained a six-second time gap on the rest of the peloton. The next day, Martin rode to a strong individual time trial victory in Grenoble, on the very same course set to be used later in the season at the Tour de France. Degenkolb then made it three wins for the team in as many days by taking a more traditional field sprint in stage 4, one where all but two riders in the peloton had the same finishing time. Later in the month Gretsch and Howard claimed wins at the Ster ZLM Toer. Gretsch was fastest against the clock in the 7 kilometers (4.3 mi) time trial that opened the race; his closest challenger was teammate Rasmussen just three seconds back. Howard took a sprint win from a 46-rider group on the Toer's final day. Amidst the team's multitude of successes at the Tour de France came a win at the partially concurrent Tour of Austria – Grabsch was solidly the strongest rider in the stage 7 individual time trial, with compatriot and teammate Gretsch finishing third on the day as well. Returning stateside in August for their first races since their dissolution was confirmed, the team got wins in both Utah and Colorado. Van Garderen won the stage 3 time trial at the Tour of Utah, holding off race leader and eventual Tour champion Levi Leipheimer by a scant five seconds. On this day, Gretsch again took third behind a teammate. The victory was the first of van Garderen's professional career, and came on his 23rd birthday. At Colorado's USA Pro Cycling Challenge, Gretsch at last got a time trial win, finishing the 8.3 kilometers (5.2 mi) prologue two seconds faster than Garmin–Cervélo's Christian Vande Velde in second. Van Garderen's eighth-place finish was enough to put him in the best young rider jersey, and Pate took the day's honors as most aggressive rider, giving the team all three jerseys available on the first day. Van Garderen later held the race lead for a day, after he figured into a six-man escape group that gained 45 seconds against the race's top riders. While he turned in a respectable sixth place the next day in the longer time trial, this was insufficient to retain the race lead. He ended the race on the podium with third overall, and held the best young rider jersey for the entire race.

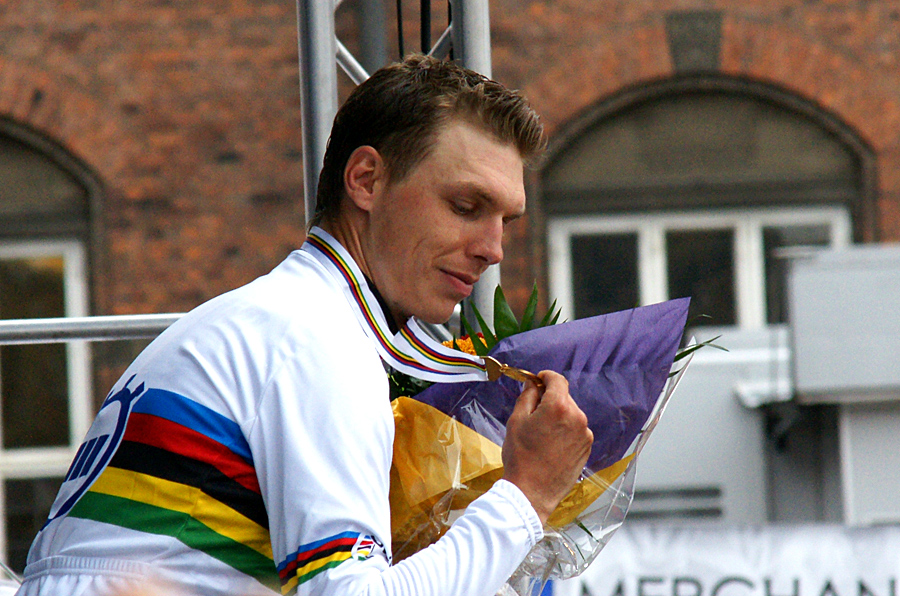
Tony Martin upon receiving the rainbow jersey for the first time. Thanks to a win in that jersey in the stage 1 individual time trial, Martin won the inaugural Tour of Beijing.

At the Tour of Britain, the final major event before the 2011 UCI Road World Championships, Cavendish made his first appearance at his 'home' race since 2007. It was part of his plan to be at peak form before worlds. He was immediately successful. He and leadout man Renshaw were so convincingly the best in the stage 1 sprint that the leadout man finished in second place right behind his sprinter, much like they had in the Champs-Élysées stage at the 2009 Tour de France. Their positions were reversed in the stage 5 sprint, as Renshaw took victory ahead of Cavendish. It was unclear whether Cavendish intentionally gifted the stage to his longtime leadout man, though Renshaw acknowledged afterward that Cavendish was definitely not giving a full effort. The news on the day for the team was not all good, as Rasmussen was pulled from the event and had his contract terminated due to news that he had missed three doping controls. Rasmussen was later exonerated due to a procedural error on the part of the UCI. Undeterred, Cavendish closed out the Tour of Britain by winning the very short road race stage into London on its final day. Renshaw, again, took second place, perhaps proving himself the better of each other team's primary sprinter. In October, as the team's time together was winding down, Martin debuted his newly won world championship rainbow jersey in the stage 1 time trial at the inaugural Tour of Beijing. None of the race's subsequent stages did anything to dislodge the German from the top of the overall standings, making him the first overall winner of the new event.

It was rare for the team to attend a stage race and come away without a stage win, classification win, or overall podium finish. Only at the Tirreno–Adriatico, the Tour de Romandie, the Tour de Suisse, and the Eneco Tour did this happen.

== Grand Tours ==
=== Giro d'Italia ===
HTC-Highroad named an ardent, multi-faceted squad for the Giro d'Italia. Cavendish was named to the squad, marking his return to the Italian Grand Tour after he instead rode the Tour of California in 2010. Sivtsov and Pinotti, both strong individual time trialists, were named as overall classification riders, with Lewis to be a support man in the mountains. The rest of the squad was named with brute strength, for the stage 1 team time trial and for leading out Cavendish's sprints, in mind. In this way, the squad targeted nearly everything in the race. The team time trial was a particular goal for the squad; their plan was to have Pinotti cross the line first and therefore claim the first pink jersey as race leader.

The team time trial went about as well as the squad could have hoped. They set the best time at the intermediate time check and at the finish line, the first and only squad to finish under 21 minutes. Though they finished with only five riders, five was all they needed, as the squad's time was taken for the fifth man to cross the line. Pinotti indeed was the first over, and took the first pink jersey. It was the second time in his career he held the Giro race lead, having previously held it for four days in the 2008 Giro d'Italia. He made it clear after the stage that the team's focus for stage 2 would be Cavendish, in the sprint. Given that the Giro awards time bonuses for the first three riders to finish a road race stage, that made it extremely likely that Cavendish would take the pink jersey the next day. The team did work for Cavendish in stage 2, and he did become the new race leader, but he missed out on the stage win. Lampre–ISD's Alessandro Petacchi opened the sprint first, to the right of Cavendish's last leadout man Renshaw, leaving Cavendish to take the line to Renshaw's left. Just as Cavendish occupied a position with open road in front of him, Petacchi deviated from his line and rode directly in front of Cavendish for a few meters. When Cavendish tried to go around Petacchi, the Italian again changed his line to stay in front of Cavendish. After a moment, both sprinted with open road in front of them, and Petacchi came across the line first by a matter of millimeters. Cavendish was visibly upset, shouting and gesticulating at Petacchi after they crossed the finish line. Cavendish later explained that his frustration was not directed at Petacchi, but at race officials, since he felt he would be relegated if he had sprinted in a similar manner. However, he also said that he never had the intention of appealing the result. His sporting director Valerio Piva also took that stance, stating that Petacchi's sprint was "not really fair play." The next day, Cavendish made a point of apologizing to Petacchi via Twitter for his outburst after crossing the finish line. Cavendish then rode as race leader on stage 3, the day Wouter Weylandt died, finishing well back after repeated mechanical trouble. Sivtsov, Pinotti, and Lewis remained highly placed overall, staying so after the neutralized fourth stage had no effect on any of the race's standings.

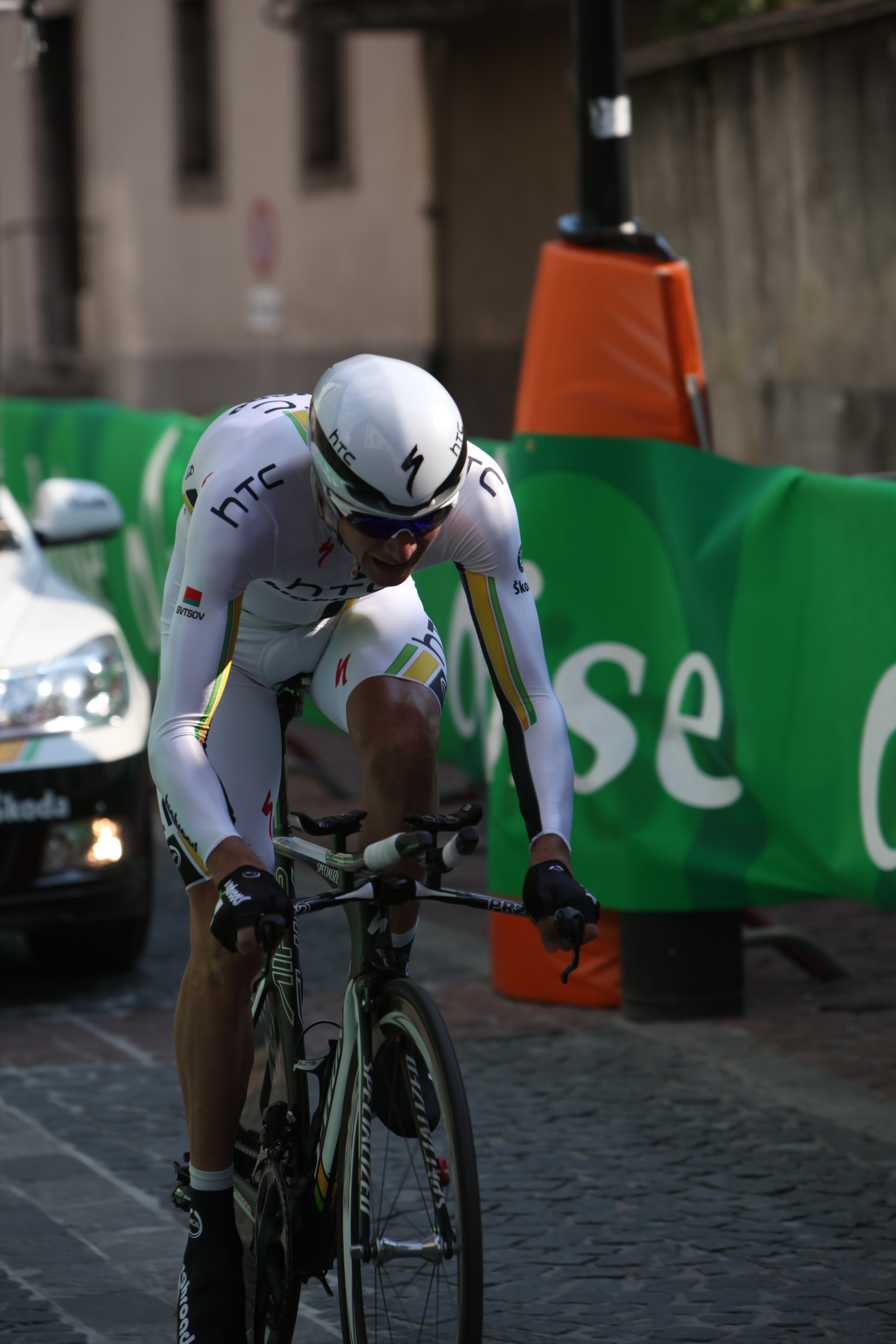
Kanstantsin Sivtsov, pictured here at the Tour de Romandie, took tenth place overall in the Giro, his highest overall placement in a Grand Tour in his career.

In stage 5, Pinotti and Sivtsov both finished with the first large group on the road, over the numerous unpaved or 'white' roads into Orvieto. Their group afforded solo stage winner Pieter Weening sufficient time that he took the next pink jersey, but the two HTC-Highroad men remained extremely well-placed in second and third overall, just two seconds back. Pinotti had a bad day on Etna in stage 9, finishing five minutes back of stage winner, new race leader, and eventual Giro champion Alberto Contador, and between three and four minutes behind the race's other top riders. The result dropped him to 25th overall, but Sivtsov remained in second place, the only rider within a minute of Contador. This difficult mountain stage nearly brought Cavendish's Giro to an end as well, as his group, which also contained Raboň, Rasmussen, and Renshaw, finished just 30 seconds inside the minimum survival time based on the stage winner's time. Rival sprinter Francisco Ventoso from Movistar Team claimed that Cavendish should have been disqualified anyway, saying that the Manxman had illegally used the race caravan for slipstreams on his ascent of Etna. Stage 10 after the rest day was one of the few seemingly straightforward sprint stages in this Giro. When former race leader David Millar attacked out of the peloton just outside the 1 kilometer (0.62 mi) to go marker, HTC-Highroad was the team to chase him down. While they did successfully bring him back, this left their vaunted leadout train disorganized. Only Cavendish, Sivtsov, and Pinotti finished with the front group. Nonetheless, Cavendish was able to surge past Petacchi, who had been left for an early sprint by his leadout man Danilo Hondo, to claim his first victory of the race. He took the opportunity after the stage to address Ventoso's remarks, claiming that because of his star status he is always led by race officials and photographers, even when at the very back of the race. Cavendish added another win in stage 12, the last flat stage before a crushingly difficult final week and a half. He was very nearly caught in the sprint by Team Sky's Davide Appollonio, but he edged out the young Italian for a second stage victory. Cavendish, and several other sprinters, left the Giro the next day.

The next day was the first of three consecutive summit finishes that preceded the second rest day. Contador, alongside José Rujano, took the opportunity to further stamp his authority on the race, taking another minute and a half out of the race's other top riders. Sivtsov lost two minutes and 42 seconds to Contador, and more significantly a little over a minute to the race's other leading riders. This dropped him to sixth place overall. He lost more time on the Zoncolan the next day, though his overall position remained unchanged. Stage 15 was the first time no HTC-Highroad rider occupied a position in the top ten, as Sivtsov dropped to 12th overall by losing close to seven minutes in the Giro's queen stage. Pinotti rebounded a bit from a disappointing second half of the Giro to ride to eighth place in the stage 16 individual time trial.

Sivtsov found an extremely fortunate breakaway in stage 17. The course's profile suggested that the winner was likely to come from the breakaway. When he, Hubert Dupont, and Christophe Le Mével, all of them within the top 16 overall at the beginning of the day, made the group, that left the onus for the chase on teams like Liquigas–Cannondale, Geox–TMC, and Euskaltel–Euskadi, since their riders could conceivably be displaced from high overall positions. Liquigas–Cannondale successfully lowered the group's time gap to the point that their leader Vincenzo Nibali's overall third place was not in jeopardy, but Geox–TMC's and Euskaltel–Euskadi's efforts were not as successful. Sivtsov finished nearly three minutes ahead of the main field, moving back into the top ten overall, at fifth. Pinotti then also made a winning breakaway the next day. Having correctly anticipated a climb where the race would break up, Pinotti made all the day's selections to feature as one of the last three riders left at the front of the race. He narrowly missed the stage win, however, to Liquigas–Cannondale's Eros Capecchi. He then turned his attentions to the final-day individual time trial, but he and Lewis were both caught up in crashes in stage 19 that ensured that they would not complete the Giro. They struck a road sign in the middle of a traffic island, with Lewis sustaining a broken right femur and Pinotti a broken pelvis. Pinotti was said to be in extreme pain, and could not move his legs for a time. Piva stated that the sign was difficult to see before the riders came up on it. The withdrawals left the team with only four riders in the race, which stood to make Sivtsov's task of defending fifth overall all the more difficult. Indeed, Sivtsov was unable to maintain contact with the group of top overall riders on the way into Sestriere, losing sufficient time that he fell to 11th overall. He rebounded in stage 21 to take tenth place in the time trial, which coupled with the losses sustained by Mikel Nieve, tenth-placed at the beginning of the day, moved him back up to tenth overall. The team overall showed well in this time trial, with Rasmussen narrowly missing the victory, coming in second just seven seconds back of stage winner Millar. Gretsch took eighth place as well. They along with Bak were the only HTC-Highroad riders to complete the Giro. They shared the Giro's Fair Play award with five other teams.

=== Tour de France ===
HTC-Highroad's squad for the Tour de France was centered around Cavendish, back again to try to win the points classification green jersey after finishing second in those standings each of the past two years. Eisel, Renshaw, Bak, and Pate were named as leadout men, with Goss also present to perhaps try for the sprints that may be too difficult for Cavendish. Peter Velits and Tony Martin were named as possible general classification hopefuls, though Martin's true strength was the individual time trial, to be raced on the identical course to the one he won on earlier in the season at the Critérium du Dauphiné. Tour de France debutant van Garderen rounded out the squad.

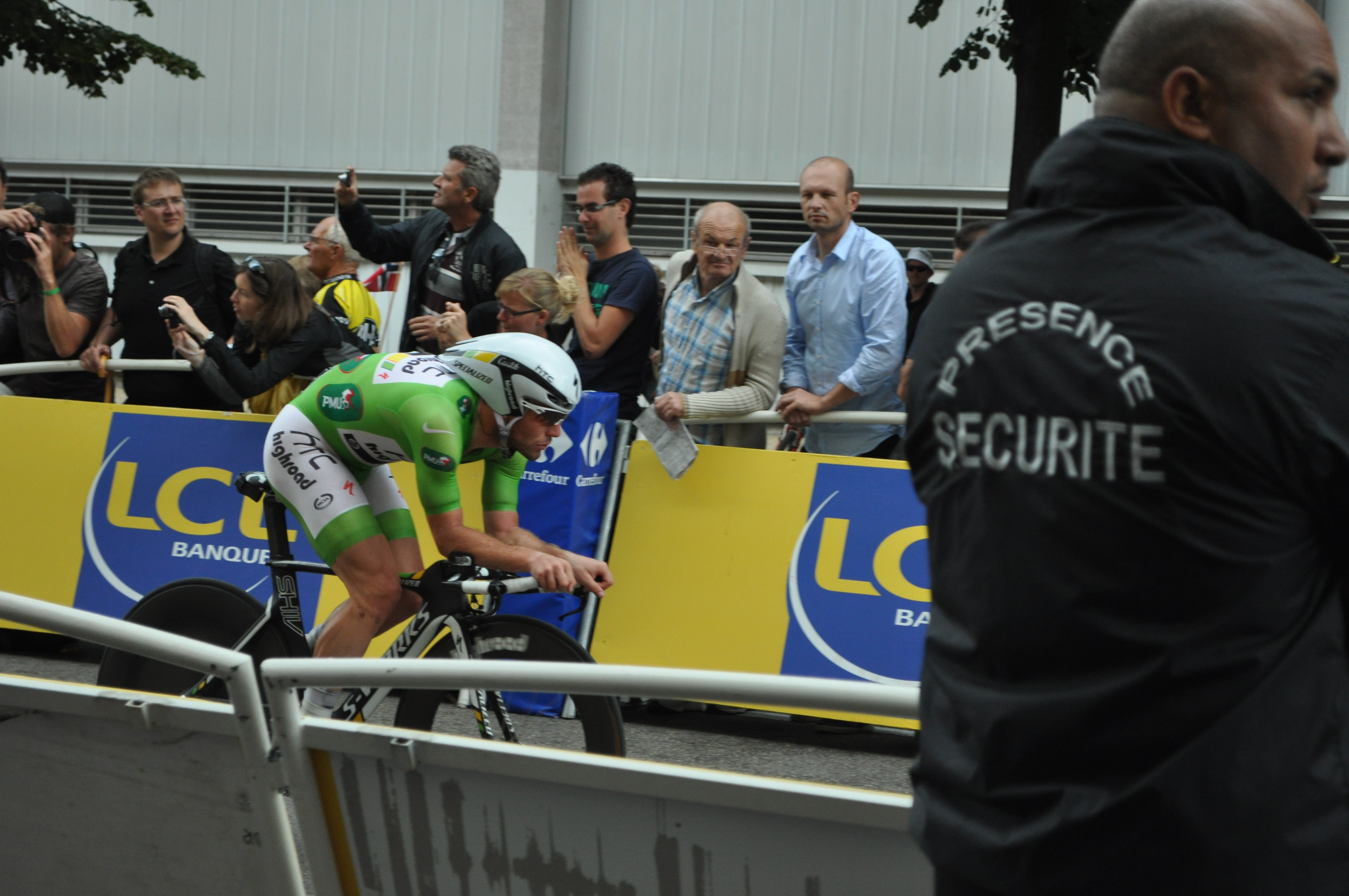
Mark Cavendish riding in the stage 20 individual time trial, wearing the green jersey he went on to win the next day.

Martin took tenth place on the first stage, ending at the Mont des Alouettes, staying with the first large group on the road but unable to match the accelerations of the day's winner Philippe Gilbert. Coming off their win in the team time trial at the Giro d'Italia, and with several of the same riders plus very strong time trialist Martin present, the squad was considered one of the favorites for the Tour's team test. However, they were unable to duplicate their success from earlier in the season, finishing five seconds slower than their American rivals Garmin–Cervélo for fifth place on the day. Stage 3 was also a day that Garmin–Cervélo got the better of them. All appeared to be going well at first, as the team hit the front with strength and numbers once the morning's breakaway was caught. However, they made errors negotiating a sharp left-hand turn at 750 meters (2,460 ft) to go, and Garmin–Cervélo was able to take first position again. Displaced by his leadout men's errors, Cavendish could only manage fifth in the sprint, behind Garmin–Cervélo's Tyler Farrar. Cavendish rebounded in stage 5, another straightforward sprint stage. While late attacks from Edvald Boasson Hagen and Philippe Gilbert threatened to disrupt the sprint once again, the peloton chased them down, and Cavendish timed his sprint perfectly to take his first win of this Tour. Stage 6 had an undulating, hilly profile, such that the finish was unlikely to suit Cavendish. The team worked for Goss, and the Australian narrowly missed the day's honors, taking second in the final sprint behind Boasson Hagen. The flat seventh stage was perhaps the first of the Tour that went completely to popular expectations, as the HTC-Highroad team provided the strength necessary to bring back the morning breakaway and was ubiquitous in the final few kilometers, dominantly leading Cavendish out to his second win of this Tour. This stage ended at Châteauroux, site of Cavendish's first win in the 2008 Tour de France. The sprint ace was evidently quite aware of this, as he mimicked his victory reaction from three years prior, grabbing his helmet with both hands and painting a shocked expression on his face. Due to a crash involving most of Team Sky, Martin and Velits entered the top ten overall with this day's results, occupying eighth and ninth place respectively at day's end. Van Garderen's presence in a stage 8 breakaway resulted in him taking the polka dot jersey as leader of the mountains classification. He was the first American to wear the polka dot jersey during a Tour stage in its history.

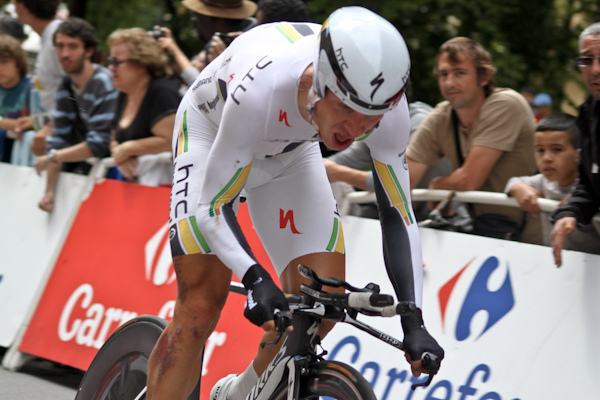
Tony Martin won the Tour's only individual time trial, having already won on this very same course earlier in the season.

Stage 10, while it contained four categorized climbs, was another likely sprint stage. Points leader Gilbert and race leader Thomas Voeckler set out on the last climb, the fourth-category Cote de Mirandol-Bourgnounac, to try to take the win themselves. The result was HTC-Highroad's support riders had to expend much more effort than usual to ensure that Cavendish was at the front of the race in the finale, and as such their leadout was less than perfect. It gave former team member André Greipel, now riding for Omega Pharma–Lotto, the opportunity to start his sprint just after Cavendish started his. Cavendish started from a seemingly optimal 170 meters (560 ft) out, but the German took the victory at the finish line. Cavendish was gracious in defeat, taking the blame himself by saying he "didn't commit enough." The two were again the top two in the sprint the next day in Lavaur, but Cavendish reversed his fate from the day before by dominantly defeating Greipel. After Geraint Thomas had begun to lead out Boasson Hagen, Renshaw jumped from Thomas' wheel to take Cavendish to the front, where the Manxman was first by almost an entire bike length. The victory put him into the green jersey for the first time.

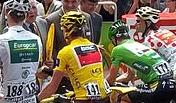
Cavendish, second from right, wearing the green jersey before the Tour's final stage, with the other jersey winners.

The next day came the Tour's first summit finish, and Velits and Martin both struggled. Velits lost four minutes and 15 seconds by finishing 31st, having been caught up in a crash at one point. Martin lost just over nine minutes by finishing 48th. Velits remained the team's highest-placed overall rider after the stage, but he fell to 14th place. The next two mountain stages were no kinder, as Velits fell to 16th after stage 14 and Martin well out of any possible contention in 35th. Stage 15 was the last stage branded as flat before the traditional flat final stage on the Champs-Élysées. Cavendish and the leadout train did not disappoint, as he took another dominant win, this time over Farrar in second. Stages 18 and 19 could have been problematic for Cavendish. Both were difficult mountain stages with summit finishes, meaning the disqualification time cut was a concern. He did in fact finish outside the time cut on stage 18, but since more than half the peloton did likewise, the group was not disqualified from the Tour. They were each individually assessed a 25-point penalty in the points classification instead. This narrowed Cavendish's lead over José Joaquín Rojas to only 15 points. A similar result happened the next day on Alpe d'Huez, with Cavendish again finishing in the last group on the road and outside the time cut. Again close to half the peloton was in the group, so they were not removed from the Tour, and since Rojas also fell in the group this time, he too was assessed the 25-point penalty. This meant the true effect was essentially nil, effectively cinching the green jersey for Cavendish.

The team found further success in the Tour's last two days. Martin made it two time trial wins in Grenoble for the season, taking a strong win in stage 20. Other than Tour champion Cadel Evans, who finished just seven seconds off Martin's pace, no other rider finished within a minute of his time. This left only the Champs-Élysées stage still to race. In the 2010 Tour de France, Cavendish became the first rider ever to win on the Champs for a second year in a row, so a third win would further extend that record. He started his sprint later than in past years, due to a headwind coming off the Place de la Concorde, but he was able to surpass Greipel and Boasson Hagen to take his fifth stage win of the Tour, putting an exclamation point on his successful green jersey campaign. Velits finished as the team's best-placed rider, taking 19th place overall.

=== Vuelta a España ===
HTC-Highroad again named a multi-faceted squad for the season's final Grand Tour, the Vuelta a España. As their dissolution was announced earlier the same month, it was also the final Grand Tour in the team's history. Cavendish and Degenkolb were named to target the sprints, with Goss and Howard also present for the possibly more difficult sprints. Martin, Sivtsov, and Martin Velits, the last of whom hoped to match his brother's surprise third-place finish in the 2010 Vuelta a España, were named as overall classification hopefuls. Albasini and Grabsch rounded out the squad. Sporting director Jens Zemke commented that the riders were mostly over the shock of the team folding, and with most of them having signed new contracts by that time, they were prepared to ride out the rest of the season as professionally and competitively as possible.

The squad had another good team time trial in stage 1, but again missed out on the victory. They finished with six riders nine seconds off the time set by the winners Leopard Trek. Cavendish and Goss were unsurprising riders to lose the pace, but a major surprise was Martin rolling in for his own time over a minute behind his teammates. Goss was later revealed to be suffering from a stomach bug, which caused him to retire from the race during stage 2. Stage 2 was flat and seemingly conducive to one of HTC-Highroad's vaunted sprinters, but Cavendish was unable to finish with the first group on the road, coming home in a large group a minute later, and Degenkolb could manage only tenth place behind the day's winner Christopher Sutton. Two days later, during stage 4, Cavendish also quit the race, citing the extremely hot temperatures as his reason. The withdrawal potentially complicated his plans to ride the Tour of Britain as preparation for the world championships road race. UCI rules state that if a rider voluntarily withdraws from an event, he is forbidden to participate in another until that first event concludes, unless its organizers give their okay. The Tour of Britain overlapped the Vuelta by a single day. Cavendish was eventually given permission by Vuelta organizers to start that race.

The squad remained quiet until the stage 10 individual time trial. Martin dominantly won the race against the clock, with only Team Sky's Chris Froome finishing within a minute of his time – and even then, only a single second inside of a minute. Post-race analysis found Martin's emphatic defeat of rival chrono specialist Fabian Cancellara a likely portend for the world championships time trial to come. Degenkolb came close to victory on stage 12, finishing second in a selective sprint behind Peter Sagan of Liquigas–Cannondale. The squad took their second Vuelta victory the next day. After making his way into a 20-man escape group, one which the race's top riders were content to let go as it contained no overall threat, Albasini proved himself easily the strongest by dominantly winning the sprint for the line. This was despite having tried to foil a sprint finish with an attack from 3 kilometers (1.9 mi) out, which was neutralized. The squad did not feature in the remainder of the race, with only Degenkolb's fourth place in the Vuelta's final sprint to show for themselves. Albasini, Velits, Grabsch, Degenkolb, and Howard were the only team members to complete the race, and all were more than three and a half hours down in the final overall standings.

== Team dissolution ==
Columbia Sportswear, who had previously sponsored the team since the middle of the 2008 season, withdrew prior to 2011, leaving the team to use the Highroad placeholder again while they searched for a new sponsor. Since HTC Corporation's sponsorship contract was set to expire after 2011, it created a sense of immediacy in the sponsor search. Team manager Stapleton said that should a sponsor not be found by the end of the Tour de France, it would be unlikely that the team would continue. He further clarified that he wanted the issue resolved by the Tour's second rest day; but despite rumors, no announcement was made that day. Stapleton attended the Tour in person in hopes of bolstering ongoing negotiations with several supposed potential new sponsors. The end of the Tour came and passed with no announcement of a new sponsor, despite ample unofficial word that Stapleton was close to finding one.

In early August, the seemingly inevitable came to pass, and Stapleton confirmed that the sponsor search had proven fruitless and the team would not continue in 2012. From the time the team first assumed the Highroad moniker in 2007 to the time its disbanding was announced, they had accumulated 484 victories among the men's and women's teams, including 54 Grand Tour stages. By the end of 2011, that number increased to 513 wins. The cycling world reacted with shock and sadness to the announcement of the team's demise. Cavendish was quick to point that HTC Corporation's sponsorship had kept the team from folding two years prior, but most reactions were based on disbelief that a team which won so frequently could fail to find a sponsor. Lewis was described as taking the announcement particularly hard, as he was still injured from his Giro d'Italia crash and unable to race at the time. All team riders eventually found new contracts.

=== Riders' 2012 teams ===
Rider	2012 team
Michael Albasini	GreenEDGE
Lars Bak	Lotto–Belisol
Matt Brammeier	Omega Pharma–Quick-Step
Mark Cavendish	Team Sky
John Degenkolb	Project 1t4i
Bernhard Eisel	Team Sky
Caleb Fairly	SpiderTech–C10
Jan Ghyselinck	Cofidis
Matthew Goss	GreenEDGE
Bert Grabsch	Omega Pharma–Quick-Step
Patrick Gretsch	Project 1t4i
Leigh Howard	GreenEDGE

Rider	2012 team
Craig Lewis	Champion System
Tony Martin	Omega Pharma–Quick-Step
Danny Pate	Team Sky
Marco Pinotti	BMC Racing Team
František Raboň	Omega Pharma–Quick-Step
Alex Rasmussen	Garmin–Barracuda
Mark Renshaw	Rabobank
Hayden Roulston	RadioShack–Nissan
Kanstantsin Sivtsov	Team Sky
Gatis Smukulis	Team Katusha
Tejay van Garderen	BMC Racing Team
Martin Velits	Omega Pharma–Quick-Step
Peter Velits	Omega Pharma–Quick-Step

== Season victories ==
Date	Race	Competition	Rider	Country	Location
January 16	Cancer Council Helpline Classic	National event	Matthew Goss (AUS)	Australia	Adelaide
January 18	Tour Down Under, Stage 1	UCI World Tour	Matthew Goss (AUS)	Australia	Angaston
January 23	Tour Down Under, Sprints classification	UCI World Tour	Matthew Goss (AUS)	Australia	
February 10	Tour of Qatar, Stage 4	UCI Asia Tour	Mark Renshaw (AUS)	Qatar	Al Kharaitiyat
February 11	Tour of Qatar, Overall	UCI Asia Tour	Mark Renshaw (AUS)	Qatar	
February 16	Tour of Oman, Stage 2	UCI Asia Tour	Matthew Goss (AUS)	Oman	Al Wutayya
February 17	Volta ao Algarve, Stage 2	UCI Europe Tour	John Degenkolb (GER)	Portugal	Lagos
February 20	Tour of Oman, Stage 6	UCI Asia Tour	Mark Cavendish (GBR)	Oman	Muttrah
February 20	Volta ao Algarve, Stage 5	UCI Europe Tour	Tony Martin (GER)	Portugal	Portimão
February 20	Volta ao Algarve, Overall	UCI Europe Tour	Tony Martin (GER)	Portugal	
February 20	Volta ao Algarve, Teams classification	UCI Europe Tour	(Note: The riders on the squad were Martin Velits, John Degenkolb, Bert Grabsch, Kanstantsin Sivtsov, Tony Martin, František Raboň, Tejay van Garderen, and Peter Velits)	Portugal	
March 5	Driedaagse van West-Vlaanderen, Stage 1	UCI Europe Tour	John Degenkolb (GER)	Belgium	Bellegem
March 8	Paris–Nice, Stage 3	UCI World Tour	Matthew Goss (AUS)	France	Nuits-Saint-Georges
March 11	Paris–Nice, Stage 6	UCI World Tour	Tony Martin (GER)	France	Aix-en-Provence
March 13	Paris–Nice, Overall	UCI World Tour	Tony Martin (GER)	France	
March 19	Milan–San Remo	UCI World Tour	Matthew Goss (AUS)	Italy	Sanremo
March 21	Volta a Catalunya, Stage 1	UCI World Tour	Gatis Smukulis (LAT)	Spain	Lloret de Mar
April 6	Scheldeprijs	UCI Europe Tour	Mark Cavendish (GBR)	Belgium	Schoten
April 9	Tour of the Basque Country, Stage 6	UCI World Tour	Tony Martin (GER)	Spain	Zalla
April 9	Tour of the Basque Country, Mountains classification	UCI World Tour	Michael Albasini (SUI)	Spain	
May 1	Eschborn-Frankfurt City Loop	UCI Europe Tour	John Degenkolb (GER)	Germany	Frankfurt
May 7	Giro d'Italia, Stage 1	UCI World Tour	Team time trial (Note: The riders on the squad were Mark Cavendish, Marco Pinotti, Patrick Gretsch, Craig Lewis, Lars Bak, František Raboň, Alex Rasmussen, Mark Renshaw, and Kanstantsin Sivtsov)	Italy	Turin
May 17	Giro d'Italia, Stage 10	UCI World Tour	Mark Cavendish (GBR)	Italy	Teramo
May 19	Giro d'Italia, Stage 12	UCI World Tour	Mark Cavendish (GBR)	Italy	Ravenna
May 22	Tour of California, Stage 8	UCI America Tour	Matthew Goss (AUS)	United States	Thousand Oaks
May 22	Tour of California, Young rider classification	UCI America Tour	Tejay van Garderen (USA)	United States	
May 26	Bayern-Rundfahrt, Stage 2	UCI Europe Tour	John Degenkolb (GER)	Germany	Bad Gögging
May 27	Bayern-Rundfahrt, Stage 3	UCI Europe Tour	Michael Albasini (SUI)	Germany	Aichach
May 29	Giro d'Italia, Fair Play Teams classification	UCI World Tour	(Note: Six-way tie with Androni Giocattoli, Liquigas–Cannondale, Quick-Step, BMC Racing Team, and Colnago–CSF Inox)	Italy	
June 5	Philadelphia International Championship	UCI America Tour	Alex Rasmussen (DEN)	United States	Philadelphia
June 7	Critérium du Dauphiné, Stage 2	UCI World Tour	John Degenkolb (GER)	France	Lyon
June 8	Critérium du Dauphiné, Stage 3	UCI World Tour	Tony Martin (GER)	France	Grenoble
June 9	Critérium du Dauphiné, Stage 4	UCI World Tour	John Degenkolb (GER)	France	Mâcon
June 15	Ster ZLM Toer, Stage 1	UCI Europe Tour	Patrick Gretsch (GER)	Netherlands	Alblasserdam
June 19	Ster ZLM Toer, Stage 5	UCI Europe Tour	Leigh Howard (AUS)	Netherlands	Etten-Leur
July 6	Tour de France, Stage 5	UCI World Tour	Mark Cavendish (GBR)	France	Cap Fréhel
July 8	Tour de France, Stage 7	UCI World Tour	Mark Cavendish (GBR)	France	Châteauroux
July 9	Tour of Austria, Stage 7	UCI Europe Tour	Bert Grabsch (GER)	Austria	Podersdorf
July 13	Tour de France, Stage 11	UCI World Tour	Mark Cavendish (GBR)	France	Lavaur
July 17	Tour de France, Stage 15	UCI World Tour	Mark Cavendish (GBR)	France	Montpellier
July 23	Tour de France, Stage 20	UCI World Tour	Tony Martin (GER)	France	Grenoble
July 24	Tour de France, Stage 21	UCI World Tour	Mark Cavendish (GBR)	France	Champs-Élysées
July 24	Tour de France, Points classification	UCI World Tour	Mark Cavendish (GBR)	France	
August 12	Tour of Utah, Stage 3	UCI America Tour	Tejay van Garderen (USA)	United States	Miller Motorsports Park
August 22	USA Pro Cycling Challenge, Prologue	UCI America Tour	Patrick Gretsch (GER)	United States	Colorado Springs
August 28	USA Pro Cycling Challenge, Youth classification	UCI America Tour	Tejay van Garderen (USA)	United States	
August 29	Vuelta a España, Stage 10	UCI World Tour	Tony Martin (GER)	Spain	Salamanca
September 2	Vuelta a España, Stage 13	UCI World Tour	Michael Albasini (SUI)	Spain	Ponferrada
September 11	Tour of Britain, Stage 1	UCI Europe Tour	Mark Cavendish (GBR)	Great Britain	Dumfries
September 15	Tour of Britain, Stage 5	UCI Europe Tour	Mark Renshaw (AUS)	Great Britain	Exmouth
September 18	Tour of Britain, Stage 8b	UCI Europe Tour	Mark Cavendish (GBR)	Great Britain	London
October 5	Tour of Beijing, Stage 1	UCI World Tour	Tony Martin (GER)	China	Beijing
October 9	Tour of Beijing, Overall	UCI World Tour	Tony Martin (GER)	China	
October 16	Chrono des Nations	UCI Europe Tour	Tony Martin (GER)	France	Les Herbiers
