= Laurens ten Dam =

Dutch road racing cyclist

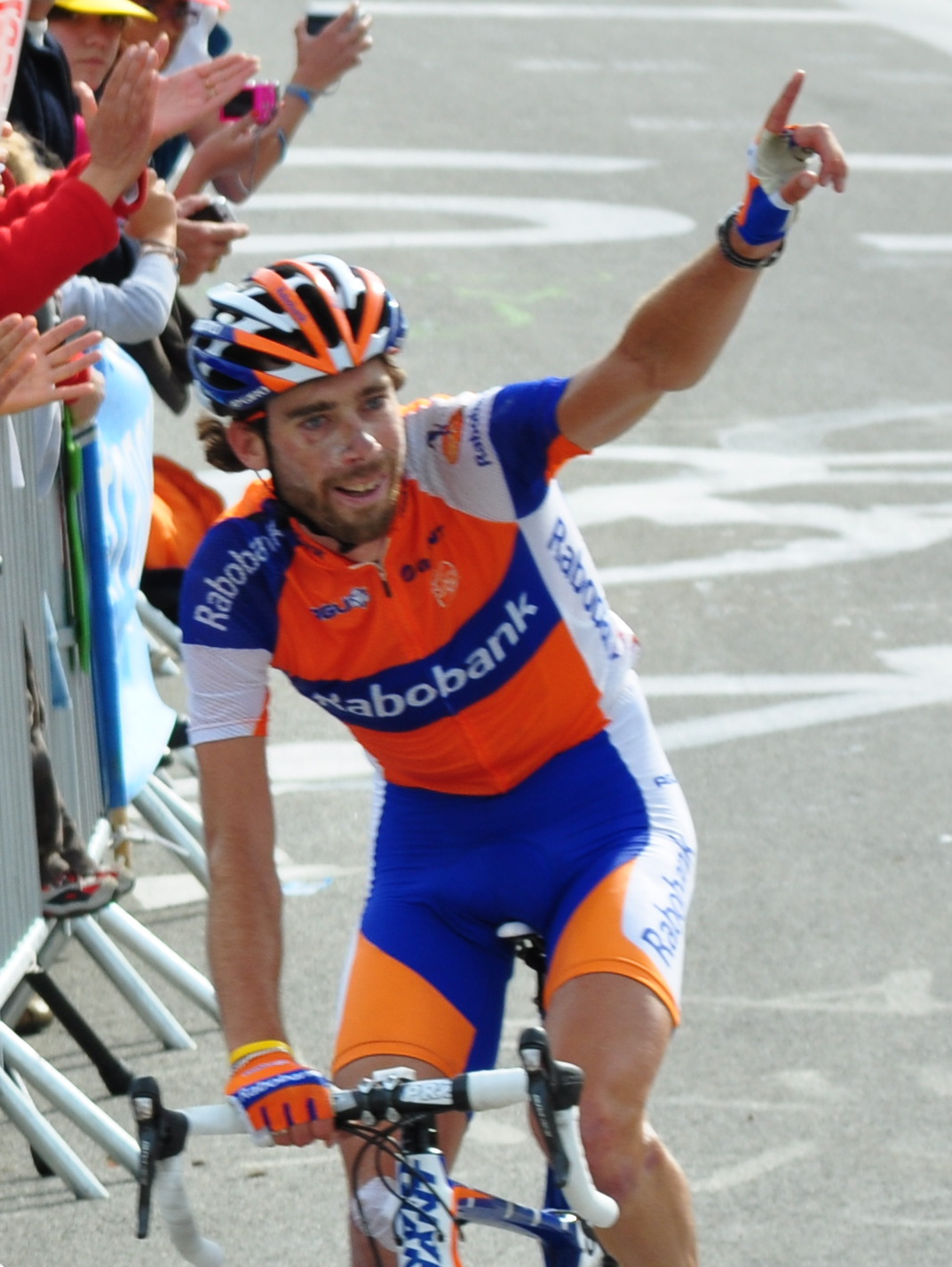
- Ten Dam at the 2011 Tour de France

Personal information
- Full name: Laurens ten Dam
- Nickname: LTD
- Born: 13 November 1980 (age 45) Bedum, Netherlands
- Height: 1.84 m (6 ft 0 in)
- Weight: 67 kg (148 lb; 10 st 8 lb)

Cycling career
- Sport: Cycling
- Disciplines: Road (former); Gravel
- Role: Rider
- Rider type: Climber

Amateur team
- 2000–2002: Rabobank Beloften

Professional teams
- 2003: Rabobank GS3
- 2004: BankGiroLoterij
- 2005: Shimano–Memory Corp
- 2006–2007: Unibet.com
- 2008–2015: Rabobank
- 2016–2018: Team Giant–Alpecin
- 2019: CCC Team

Laurens ten Dam (born 13 November 1980) is a Dutch cyclist, who competes in gravel cycling. He formerly competed professionally in road cycling between 2003 and 2019 for the Rabobank GS3, BankGiroLoterij, Unibet.com, LottoNL–Jumbo, Team Sunweb and CCC Team squads. During his road racing career, Ten Dam took two victories – stage wins at the 2006 Course de Solidarność et des Champions Olympiques and the 2008 Critérium International.

== Career ==
A native of the village of Zuidwolde in Groningen, Ten Dam started racing in 2000 with Rabobank Beloften. He remained with the team until 2003, before spending one season at both BankGiroLoterij in 2004 and Shimano–Memory Corp in 2005. He then spent two years with Unibet.com in 2006 and 2007, where he recorded a stage victory at the 2006 Course de Solidarność et des Champions Olympiques, and a top-ten overall finish at the 2007 Volta a Catalunya (ninth).

=== Rabobank (2008–2015) ===
Ten Dam joined Rabobank for the 2008 season, and won a stage at the Critérium International. The following year, he won the mountains classification at the 2009 Tour de Romandie. After no victories in 2010, Ten Dam recorded top-ten finishes at the 2011 editions of the Tour Down Under (fifth), the Tour of California (sixth), and the Tour de Suisse (eighth). In 2012, Ten Dam finished 8th in the Vuelta a España, his best grand tour finish.

In the 2013 Tour de France, Ten Dam had an excellent first two weeks of the Tour, sitting 5th overall after the end of the second week with his teammate, Bauke Mollema 2nd overall. However, in the last week, Ten Dam struggled to stay with the general classification contenders making him slip out of the top ten, finishing 13th overall.

At the 2014 Tour de France, Ten Dam was selected to lead Belkin Pro Cycling with Mollema. Through the Vosges on stages 9 and 10 Ten Dam was already almost 8 minutes behind race leader, Vincenzo Nibali giving his leadership to Mollema. Ten Dam's form slowly improved as the race went through the Alps finishing 8th on stages 13 and 14. With his good form moving through the Pyrenees, Ten Dam managed to finish in the top 10 overall, finishing 9th.

=== Team Giant–Alpecin (2016–2018) ===
In October 2015 it was announced that Ten Dam would join Team Giant–Alpecin on an initial one-year contract for 2016, after spending eight years with Rabobank and its other guises, combining racing in the United States with competing in Europe and a focus on supporting Warren Barguil and Tom Dumoulin through his climbing ability and tactical knowledge. He finished in tenth place overall at the 2016 Tour of California, but this was his only top-ten overall finish in three years with the team.

=== Retirement from road racing ===
While riding for CCC Team, Ten Dam announced his retirement from road racing in July 2019, but moved into gravel cycling.

In May 2021, Ten Dam won the Gravel Locos race in Hico, Texas.

== Personal life ==
Ten Dam is married with two children. Since his retirement from road racing, Ten Dam is able to spend more time with his family and life has become less regimented. In 2021, Ten Dam started a podcast called the "Beter Worden Podcast" (English: Get Better) in which several aspects of improving on the bike are highlighted and discussed with a human movement scientist.

== Major results ==
1999
3rd Overall Flèche du Sud
2003
1st La Marmotte
2004
9th Grote Prijs Stad Zottegem
2005
3rd Overall Ster Elektrotoer
3rd Omloop der Kempen
4th Overall Tour of Belgium
4th Overall Rheinland-Pfalz Rundfahrt
8th Overall Tour de Luxembourg
8th Kampioenschap van Vlaanderen
9th Hel van het Mergelland
2006
1st Mountains classification, Ster Elektrotoer
5th Overall Four Days of Dunkirk
7th Route Adélie de Vitré
7th Polynormande
9th Overall Course de la Solidarité Olympique

1st Stage 2a (ITT)

2007
5th Grand Prix d'Ouverture La Marseillaise
7th Overall Deutschland Tour
9th Overall Volta a Catalunya
2008
5th Overall Critérium International

1st Stage 1

10th Overall Tour de Suisse
2009
1st Mountains classification, Tour de Romandie
8th Overall Vuelta a Murcia
2010
10th Overall Vuelta a Burgos
2011
5th Overall Tour Down Under
6th Overall Tour of California
8th Overall Tour de Suisse
10th Overall Vuelta a Castilla y León
2012
1st Ridderronde Maastricht
8th Overall Vuelta a España
9th Brabantse Pijl
2013
3rd Overall Tour du Haut Var
8th Overall Tour of Norway
2014
8th Overall Tour of California
9th Overall Tour de France
2016
10th Overall Tour of California
2021
1st Gravel Locos 150
2nd Unbound Gravel 200
2022
4th Unbound Gravel 200
2023
4th Unbound Gravel 200

=== General classification results timeline ===
Grand Tour general classification results
Grand Tour	2007	2008	2009	2010	2011	2012	2013	2014	2015	2016	2017	2018	2019
Giro d'Italia	—	—	28	—	—	—	—	—	—	—	34	35	DNF
Tour de France	—	21	60	—	58	28	13	9	92	73	67	51	—
Vuelta a España	—	—	—	DNF	—	8	DNF	44	—	—	—	—	—
Major stage race general classification results
Race	2007	2008	2009	2010	2011	2012	2013	2014	2015	2016	2017	2018	2019
Paris–Nice	—	42	—	—	DNF	43	—	—	—	122	—	—	44
Tirreno–Adriatico	—	—	—	—	—	—	—	—	80	—	—	—	—
Volta a Catalunya	9	—	—	28	12	77	60	62	DNF	80	16	65	31
Tour of the Basque Country	62	29	—	59	—	—	39	—	—	—	60	DNF	—
Tour de Romandie	30	59	42	—	—	39	—	24	63	—	37	36	—
Critérium du Dauphiné	—	—	—	—	—	—	13	—	—	—	—	DNF	86
Tour de Suisse	65	10	—	DNF	8	23	—	13	20	72	—	—	—
Tour de Pologne	18	85	—	—	—	—	—	—	—	—	—	—	—

=== Classics results timeline ===
Monument	2004	2005	2006	2007	2008	2009	2010	2011	2012	2013	2014	2015	2016	2017	2018	2019
Milan–San Remo	—	—	—	56	—	—	—	—	—	—	—	—	—	—	—	—
Tour of Flanders	—	—	—	48	—	—	—	—	—	—	—	—	—	—	—	—
Paris–Roubaix	Did not contest during his career															
Liège–Bastogne–Liège	—	—	71	—	DNF	—	31	53	63	49	—	62	—	—	—	DNF
Giro di Lombardia	—	—	—	—	—	DNF	—	DNF	39	DNF	DNF	—	—	DNF	—	94
Classic	2004	2005	2006	2007	2008	2009	2010	2011	2012	2013	2014	2015	2016	2017	2018	2019
Strade Bianche	Race did not exist			—	—	—	—	—	—	—	—	—	—	DNF	OTL	—
Amstel Gold Race	DNF	101	41	43	50	—	52	—	—	44	51	—	—	—	94	—
La Flèche Wallonne	—	—	55	—	34	—	112	33	56	79	30	101	—	—	49	—
Clásica de San Sebastián	—	—	—	62	—	—	84	39	56	—	57	—	DNF	50	—	—
Grand Prix Cycliste de Québec	Race did not exist						—	DNF	—	—	—	—	DNF	—	—	—
Grand Prix Cycliste de Montréal	Race did not exist						—	78	—	—	—	—	96	—	—	—

=== Major championship results timeline ===
Event		2003	2004	2005	2006	2007	2008	2009	2010	2011	2012	2013	2014	2015	2016	2017	2018	2019
Olympic Games	Road race	NH	—	Not held			64	Not held			—	Not held			—	Not held		
World Championships	Road race	—	—	—	—	DNF	—	—	—	—	119	DNF	—	—	—	—	—	—
National Championships	Road race	25	—	84	35	6	38	32	—	36	DNF	18	40	DNF	47	DNF	58	73

Legend
—	Did not compete
DNF	Did not finish
NH	Not held
OTL	Outside time limit

== See also ==
- List of Dutch Olympic cyclists
