= Tour of Beijing =

Chinese multi-day road cycling race

Race details
- Date: October
- Region: Beijing, China
- Local name: 环北京职业公路自行车赛
- Nickname: 环北京、环京赛
- Discipline: Road
- Competition: UCI World Tour
- Type: Stage race
- Web site: www.discoverchina.com/beijing-tours

History
- First edition: 2011
- Editions: 4
- Final edition: 2014
- First winner: Tony Martin (GER)
- Most wins: Tony Martin (GER) (2 wins)
- Final winner: Philippe Gilbert (BEL)

The Tour of Beijing was an annual professional stage bicycle road race held in Beijing, China.

== History ==
Its first edition took place in October 2011, as the penultimate event in the 2011 UCI World Tour. The tour was a partnership between the UCI and the Beijing City Government and covered a period of four years from 2011 to 2014. The event was a legacy of the 2008 Olympic Games and promoted Beijing as a global event city, whilst also promoting the environmental and healthy living outcomes cycling represent.

In September 2014 the UCI announced that the 2014 edition of the race would be the last.

== Winners ==
Year	Country	Rider	Team
2011	Germany	Tony Martin	HTC–Highroad
2012	Germany	Tony Martin	Omega Pharma–Quick-Step
2013	Spain	Beñat Intxausti	Movistar Team
2014	Belgium	Philippe Gilbert	BMC Racing Team
