= 2011 Vattenfall Cyclassics =

Vattenfall Cyclassics
2011 UCI World Tour, race 22 of 27
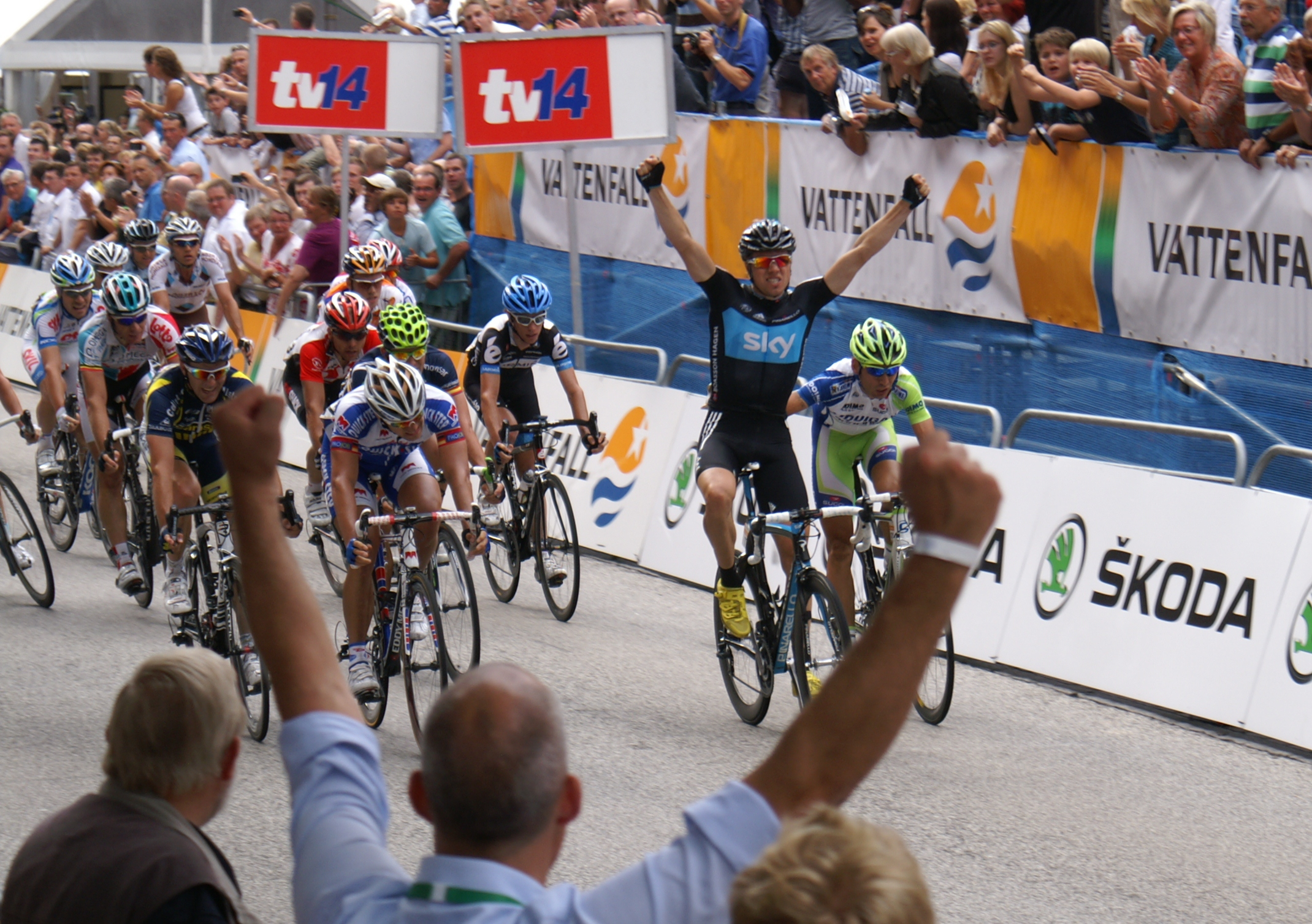
- Boasson Hagen celebrating his victory

Race details
- Dates: August 21, 2011
- Stages: 1
- Distance: 215 km (134 mi)
- Winning time: 4h 49' 40"

Results
	Winner	Edvald Boasson Hagen (NOR)	(Team Sky)
	Second	Gerald Ciolek (GER)	(Quick-Step)
	Third	Borut Božič (SLO)	(Vacansoleil–DCM)

The 2011 Vattenfall Cyclassics was the 16th edition of the Vattenfall Cyclassics, a single-day cycling race. It was held on 21 August 2011, over a distance of 215 km (133.6 mi), starting and finishing in Hamburg, Germany. It was the 22nd event of the 2011 UCI World Tour season.

Fresh from his victory in the Eneco Tour a week before the Cyclassics, Team Sky's Edvald Boasson Hagen – who, in 2010, was second to Tyler Farrar, who elected to compete in the concurrent Vuelta a España in 2011 – took the victory in a sprint finish out of a large group of riders, who had broken away after a split in the field. Boasson Hagen had attacked from 250 metres out, and held off Gerald Ciolek, who took second place for Quick-Step, while Borut Božič completed the podium for Vacansoleil–DCM.

== Results ==
Rank	Cyclist	Team	Time	UCI World Tour Points
1	Edvald Boasson Hagen (NOR)	Team Sky	4h 49' 40"	80
2	Gerald Ciolek (GER)	Quick-Step	s.t.	60
3	Borut Božič (SLO)	Vacansoleil–DCM	s.t.	50
4	Simone Ponzi (ITA)	Liquigas–Cannondale	s.t.	40
5	José Joaquín Rojas (ESP)	Movistar Team	s.t.	30
6	Jürgen Roelandts (BEL)	Omega Pharma–Lotto	s.t.	22
7	Simon Clarke (AUS)	Astana	s.t.	14
8	Manuel Antonio Cardoso (POR)	Team RadioShack	s.t.	10
9	Grega Bole (SLO)	Lampre–ISD	s.t.	6
10	Michel Kreder (NED)	Garmin–Cervélo	s.t.	2
