= 2011 UCI World Tour =

Road cycling competitions

- First edition of the UCI World Tour

Details
- Dates: 18 January – 15 October
- Location: Europe, Canada, Australia and China
- Races: 27

Champions
- Individual champion: Philippe Gilbert (BEL) (Omega Pharma–Lotto)
- Teams' champion: Omega Pharma–Lotto
- Nations' champion: Italy

The 2011 UCI World Tour was the third edition of the ranking system launched by the Union Cycliste Internationale (UCI) in 2009. The series started with the Tour Down Under's opening stage on 18 January, and consisted of 14 stage races and 13 one-day races, culminating in the Giro di Lombardia on 15 October.

== Events ==
All 26 events from the 2010 UCI World Ranking were included, though the UCI ProTour classification of events under which 16 of these were previously promoted has now been disbanded. In addition to this, the five stage Tour of Beijing has been added to the schedule.

The 18 teams that hold UCI ProTeam status are obliged to participate in all races. The organisers of each race can additionally invite other teams that hold UCI Pro-Continental status, or an ad hoc national selection, to compete.

Race	Date	Winner	Second	Third	Other points (4th place onwards)	Stage points
(Australia) Tour Down Under	January 18–23	Cameron Meyer (AUS) (100 pts)	Matthew Goss (AUS) (80 pts)	Ben Swift (GBR) (70 pts)	60, 50, 40, 30, 20, 10, 4	6, 4, 2, 1, 1
(France) Paris–Nice	March 6–13	Tony Martin (GER) (100 pts)	Andreas Klöden (GER) (80 pts)	Bradley Wiggins (GBR) (70 pts)	60, 50, 40, 30, 20, 10, 4	6, 4, 2, 1, 1
(Italy) Tirreno–Adriatico	March 9–15	Cadel Evans (AUS) (100 pts)	Robert Gesink (NED) (80 pts)	Michele Scarponi (ITA) (70 pts)	60, 50, 40, 30, 20, 10, 4	6, 4, 2, 1, 1
(Italy) Milan–San Remo	March 19	Matthew Goss (AUS) (100 pts)	Fabian Cancellara (SUI) (80 pts)	Philippe Gilbert (BEL) (70 pts)	60, 50, 40, 30, 20, 10, 4	N/A
(Spain) Volta a Catalunya	March 21–27	Michele Scarponi (ITA)† (100 pts)	Dan Martin (IRL)† (80 pts)	Chris Horner (USA)† (70 pts)	60, 50, 40, 30, 20, 10, 4	6, 4, 2, 1, 1
(Belgium) Gent–Wevelgem	March 27	Tom Boonen (BEL) (80 pts)	Daniele Bennati (ITA) (60 pts)	Tyler Farrar (USA) (50 pts)	40, 30, 22, 14, 10, 6, 2	N/A
(Belgium) Tour of Flanders	April 3	Nick Nuyens (BEL) (100 pts)	Sylvain Chavanel (FRA) (80 pts)	Fabian Cancellara (SUI) (70 pts)	60, 50, 40, 30, 20, 10, 4	N/A
(Spain) Tour of the Basque Country	April 4–9	Andreas Klöden (GER) (100 pts)	Chris Horner (USA) (80 pts)	Robert Gesink (NED) (70 pts)	60, 50, 40, 30, 20, 10, 4	6, 4, 2, 1, 1
(France) Paris–Roubaix	April 10	Johan Vansummeren (BEL) (100 pts)	Fabian Cancellara (SUI) (80 pts)	Maarten Tjallingii (NED) (70 pts)	60, 50, 40, 30, 20, 10, 4	N/A
(Netherlands) Amstel Gold Race	April 17	Philippe Gilbert (BEL) (80 pts)	Joaquim Rodríguez (ESP) (60 pts)	Simon Gerrans (AUS) (50 pts)	40, 30, 22, 14, 10, 6, 2	N/A
(Belgium) La Flèche Wallonne	April 20	Philippe Gilbert (BEL) (80 pts)	Joaquim Rodríguez (ESP) (60 pts)	Samuel Sánchez (ESP) (50 pts)	40, 30, 22, 14, 10, 6, 2	N/A
(Belgium) Liège–Bastogne–Liège	April 24	Philippe Gilbert (BEL) (100 pts)	Fränk Schleck (LUX) (80 pts)	Andy Schleck (LUX) (70 pts)	60, 50, 40, 30, 20, 10, 4	N/A
(Switzerland) Tour de Romandie	April 26 – May 1	Cadel Evans (AUS) (100 pts)	Tony Martin (GER) (80 pts)	Alexander Vinokourov (KAZ) (70 pts)	60, 50, 40, 30, 20, 10, 4	6, 4, 2, 1, 1
(Italy) Giro d'Italia	May 7–29	Michele Scarponi (ITA)† (170 pts)	Vincenzo Nibali (ITA)† (130 pts)	John Gadret (FRA)† (100 pts)	90, 80, 70, 60, 52, 44, 38, 32, 26, 22, 18, 14, 10, 8, 6, 4, 2	16, 8, 4, 2, 1
(France) Critérium du Dauphiné	June 5–12	Bradley Wiggins (GBR) (100 pts)	Cadel Evans (AUS) (80 pts)	Alexander Vinokourov (KAZ) (70 pts)	60, 50, 40, 30, 20, 10, 4	6, 4, 2, 1, 1
(Switzerland) Tour de Suisse	June 11–19	Levi Leipheimer (USA) (100 pts)	Damiano Cunego (ITA) (80 pts)	Steven Kruijswijk (NED) (70 pts)	60, 50, 40, 30, 20, 10, 4	6, 4, 2, 1, 1
Tour de France	July 2–24	Cadel Evans (AUS) (200 pts)	Andy Schleck (LUX) (150 pts)	Fränk Schleck (LUX) (120 pts)	110, 100, 90, 80, 70, 60, 50, 40, 30, 24, 20, 16, 12, 10, 8, 6, 4	20, 10, 6, 4, 2
(Spain) Clásica de San Sebastián	July 30	Philippe Gilbert (BEL) (80 pts)	Carlos Barredo (ESP) (60 pts)	Greg Van Avermaet (BEL) (50 pts)	40, 30, 22, 14, 10, 6, 2	N/A
(Poland) Tour de Pologne	July 31 – August 6	Peter Sagan (SVK) (100 pts)	Dan Martin (IRL) (80 pts)	Marco Marcato (ITA) (70 pts)	60, 50, 40, 30, 20, 10, 4	6, 4, 2, 1, 1
(Belgium) (Netherlands) Eneco Tour	August 8–14	Edvald Boasson Hagen (NOR) (100 pts)	Philippe Gilbert (BEL) (80 pts)	David Millar (GBR) (70 pts)	60, 50, 40, 30, 20, 10, 4	6, 4, 2, 1, 1
(Spain) Vuelta a España	August 20 – September 11	Chris Froome (GBR)^ (170 pts)	Bradley Wiggins (GBR)^ (130 pts)	Bauke Mollema (NED)^ (100 pts)	90, 80, 70, 60, 52, 44, 38, 32, 26, 22, 18, 14, 10, 8, 6, 4, 2	16, 8, 4, 2, 1
(Germany) Vattenfall Cyclassics	August 21	Edvald Boasson Hagen (NOR) (80 pts)	Gerald Ciolek (GER) (60 pts)	Borut Božič (SLO) (50 pts)	40, 30, 22, 14, 10, 6, 2	N/A
GP Ouest-France	August 28	Grega Bole (SLO) (80 pts)	Simon Gerrans (AUS) (60 pts)	Thomas Voeckler (FRA) (50 pts)	40, 30, 22, 14, 10, 6, 2	N/A
(Canada) GP de Québec	September 9	Philippe Gilbert (BEL) (80 pts)	Robert Gesink (NED) (60 pts)	Rigoberto Urán (COL) (50 pts)	40, 30, 22, 14, 10, 6, 2	N/A
(Canada) GP de Montréal	September 11	Rui Costa (POR) (80 pts)	Pierrick Fédrigo (FRA) (60 pts)	Philippe Gilbert (BEL) (50 pts)	40, 30, 22, 14, 10, 6, 2	N/A
(China) Tour of Beijing	October 5–9	Tony Martin (GER) (100 pts)	David Millar (GBR) (80 pts)	Chris Froome (GBR) (70 pts)	60, 50, 40, 30, 20, 10, 4	6, 4, 2, 1, 1
(Italy) Giro di Lombardia	October 15	Oliver Zaugg (SUI) (100 pts)	Dan Martin (IRL) (80 pts)	Joaquim Rodríguez (ESP) (70 pts)	60, 50, 40, 30, 20, 10, 4	N/A

†: Riders promoted after removal of the results of Alberto Contador.
^: Riders promoted after removal of the results of Juan José Cobo.

== Final standings ==
In a change from previous years, only riders of a UCI ProTeam were to be able to score points for the world ranking. However, in early 2012, the UCI included such riders in a revised table, but non ProTour teams were still omitted from the team rankings. This was subsequently reverted, and the 52 non ProTeam riders were again removed from the calculations.

Alberto Contador, who initially finished in third place overall, had his results retrospectively removed in February 2012, and his points were reallocated. Spain had been leader of the nation rankings before this reallocation.

=== Individual ===
Riders tied with the same number of points are classified by number of victories, then number of second places, third places, and so on, in World Tour events and stages.

Rank	Name	Team	Points
1	Philippe Gilbert (BEL)	Omega Pharma–Lotto	718
2	Cadel Evans (AUS)	BMC Racing Team	584
3	Joaquim Rodríguez (ESP)	Team Katusha	446
4	Michele Scarponi (ITA)	Lampre–ISD	419
5	Tony Martin (GER)	HTC–Highroad	349
6	Samuel Sánchez (ESP)	Euskaltel–Euskadi	317
7	Vincenzo Nibali (ITA)	Liquigas–Cannondale	310
8	Dan Martin (IRL)	Garmin–Cervélo	296
9	Bradley Wiggins (GBR)	Team Sky	289
10	Fränk Schleck (LUX)	Leopard Trek	284
11	Edvald Boasson Hagen (NOR)	Team Sky	260
12	Fabian Cancellara (SUI)	Leopard Trek	252
13	Andy Schleck (LUX)	Leopard Trek	252
14	Ivan Basso (ITA)	Liquigas–Cannondale	250
15	Chris Froome (GBR)	Team Sky	230
16	Alexander Vinokourov (KAZ)	Astana	230
17	Robert Gesink (NED)	Rabobank	222
18	Matthew Goss (AUS)	HTC–Highroad	217
19	Damiano Cunego (ITA)	Lampre–ISD	213
20	Andreas Klöden (GER)	Team RadioShack	207

- 230 riders on UCI ProTour teams scored points.

=== Team ===
Team rankings were calculated by adding the ranking points of the top five riders of a team in the table.

Rank	Team	Points	Top five riders
1	Omega Pharma–Lotto	1101	Gilbert (718), Greipel (132), Van Den Broeck (125), Roelandts (66), Vanendert (60)
2	Team Sky	1069	Wiggins (289), Boasson Hagen (260), Froome (230), Urán (179), Gerrans (111)
3	Leopard Trek	1024	F Schleck (284), A Schleck (252), Cancellara (252), Fuglsang (136) Zaugg (100)
4	HTC–Highroad	892	Martin (349), Goss (217), Cavendish (152), Pinotti (110), Sivtsov (64)
5	BMC Racing Team	887	Evans (584), Ballan (100), Van Avermaet (90), Phinney (71), Frank (42)
6	Lampre–ISD	856	Scarponi (419), Cunego (213), Bole (91), Petacchi (81), Niemiec (52)
7	Liquigas–Cannondale	837	Nibali (310), Basso (250), P. Sagan (198), Ponzi (54), Capecchi (25)
8	Garmin–Cervélo	818	Martin (296), Millar (185), Hushovd (123), Farrar (108), Meyer (106)
9	Rabobank	687	Gesink (222), Mollema (190), Kruijswijk (128), Matthews (74), Ten Dam (73)
10	Team RadioShack	649	Klöden (207), Leipheimer (158), Horner (153), Brajkovič (71), Rast (60)
11	Team Katusha	632	Rodríguez (446), Moreno (80), Pozzato (50), Kolobnev (30), Brutt (26)
12	Euskaltel–Euskadi	489	Sánchez (317), Nieve (92), Antón (72), Castroviejo (6), Pérez (2)
13	Movistar Team	484	Intxausti (118), Costa (101), Tondo (100), Rojas (95), Ventoso (70)
14	Astana	434	Vinokourov (230), Kreuziger (145), Tiralongo (23), Hryvko (20), Clarke (16)
15	Ag2r–La Mondiale	398	Péraud (161), Gadret (126), Nocentini (46), Dupont (34), Mondory (31)
16	Quick-Step	383	Boonen (140), Chavanel (90), Ciolek (67), Devenyns (50), Cataldo (36)
17	Vacansoleil–DCM	369	Marcato (102), Poels (94), Leukemans (76), Božič (57), Van Leijen (40)
18	Saxo Bank–SunGard	228	Nuyens (101), C A Sørensen (80), J. J. Haedo (34), Porte (10), Cooke (3)

=== Nation ===
National rankings were calculated by adding the ranking points of the top five riders registered in a nation in the table. The national rankings are used to determine how many riders a country can have in the World Championships and the Olympics.

Rank	Nation	Points	Top five riders
1	Italy	1302	Scarponi (419), Nibali (310), Basso (250), Cunego (213), Pinotti (110)
2	Belgium	1184	Gilbert (718), Boonen (140), Van Den Broeck (125), Nuyens (101), Van Summeren (100)
3	Australia	1092	Evans (584), Goss (217), Gerrans (111), Meyer (106), Matthews (74)
4	Spain	1076	Rodríguez (446), Sánchez (317), Intxausti (118), Tondo (100), Rojas (95)
5	Great Britain	947	Wiggins (289), Froome (230), Millar (185), Cavendish (152), Swift (91)
6	Germany	798	Martin (349), Klöden (207), Greipel (132), Ciolek (67), Weggman (43)
7	Netherlands	707	Gesink (222), Mollema (190), Kruijswijk (128), Poels (94), Ten Dam (73)
8	United States	571	Leipheimer (158), Horner (153), Farrar (108), Danielson (81), Phinney (71)
9	Luxembourg	536	F Schleck (284), A Schleck (252)
10	Switzerland	470	Cancellara (252), Zaugg (100), Rast (60), Frank (42), Albasini (16)
11	France	442	Péraud (161), Gadret (126), Chavanel (90), Dupont (34), Mondory (31)
12	Norway	390	Boasson Hagen (260), Hushovd (123), Kristoff (7)
13	Ireland	319	Martin (296), Roche (19), Deignan (4)
14	Denmark	285	Fuglsang (136), Sørensen (80), Bak (54), Rasmussen (13), Jørgensen (2)
15	Kazakhstan	234	Vinokourov (230), Renev (4)
16	Slovenia	219	Bole (91), Brajkovič (71), Božič (57)
17	Slovakia	214	P. Sagan (198), P. Velits (16)
18	Colombia	185	Urán (179), Soler (6)
19	Portugal	165	Costa (101), Machado (35), Cardoso (27), Paulinho (1), Oliveira (1)
20	Czech Republic	146	Kreuziger (145), Raboň (1)

- Riders from 35 countries scored points.

== Leader progress ==
Event (Winner)	Individual	Team	Nation
Tour Down Under (Cameron Meyer)	Cameron Meyer	Rabobank	Australia
Paris–Nice (Tony Martin)	Tony Martin	HTC–Highroad	Australia
Tirreno–Adriatico (Cadel Evans)	Cadel Evans	HTC–Highroad	Australia
Milan–San Remo (Matthew Goss)	Matthew Goss	HTC–Highroad	Australia
Volta a Catalunya (Alberto Contador)	Matthew Goss	HTC–Highroad	Australia
Gent–Wevelgem (Tom Boonen)	Matthew Goss	HTC–Highroad	Australia
Tour of Flanders (Nick Nuyens)	Matthew Goss	HTC–Highroad	Australia
Tour of the Basque Country (Andreas Klöden)	Matthew Goss	Team RadioShack	Australia
Paris–Roubaix (Johan Vansummeren)	Fabian Cancellara	Team RadioShack	Italy
Amstel Gold Race (Philippe Gilbert)	Fabian Cancellara	Team RadioShack	Belgium
Flèche Wallonne (Philippe Gilbert)	Philippe Gilbert	Team RadioShack	Belgium
Liège–Bastogne–Liège (Philippe Gilbert)	Philippe Gilbert	Leopard Trek	Belgium
Tour de Romandie (Cadel Evans)	Philippe Gilbert	HTC–Highroad	Belgium
Giro d'Italia (Alberto Contador)	Philippe Gilbert	HTC–Highroad	Spain
Critérium du Dauphiné (Bradley Wiggins)	Philippe Gilbert	HTC–Highroad	Spain
Tour de Suisse (Levi Leipheimer)	Philippe Gilbert	HTC–Highroad	Spain
Tour de France (Cadel Evans)	Cadel Evans	Leopard Trek	Spain
Clásica de San Sebastián (Philippe Gilbert)	Cadel Evans	Leopard Trek	Spain
Tour de Pologne (Peter Sagan)	Cadel Evans	Leopard Trek	Spain
Eneco Tour (Edvald Boasson Hagen)	Cadel Evans	Leopard Trek	Spain
Vattenfall Cyclassics (Edvald Boasson Hagen)	Cadel Evans	Leopard Trek	Spain
GP Ouest-France (Grega Bole)	Cadel Evans	Leopard Trek	Spain
GP de Québec (Philippe Gilbert)	Philippe Gilbert	Leopard Trek	Spain
Vuelta a España (Chris Froome)	Philippe Gilbert	Omega Pharma–Lotto	Spain
GP de Montréal (Rui Costa)	Philippe Gilbert	Omega Pharma–Lotto	Spain
Tour of Beijing (Tony Martin)	Philippe Gilbert	Omega Pharma–Lotto	Spain
Giro di Lombardia (Oliver Zaugg)	Philippe Gilbert	Omega Pharma–Lotto	Spain
Removal of Contador's results	Philippe Gilbert	Omega Pharma–Lotto	Italy
