= 2011 GP Ouest-France =

GP Ouest-France
2011 UCI World Tour, race 23 of 27

Race details
- Dates: 28 August 2011
- Stages: 1
- Distance: 248.3 km (154.3 mi)
- Winning time: 6h 32' 40"

Results
	Winner	Grega Bole (Slovenia)	(Lampre–ISD)
	Second	Simon Gerrans (Australia)	(Team Sky)
	Third	Thomas Voeckler (France)	(Team Europcar)

The 2011 GP Ouest-France was the 75th edition of the GP Ouest-France, a single-day cycling race. It was held on 28 August 2011, over a distance of 248.3 km (154.3 mi), starting and finishing in Plouay, France. It was the 23rd event of the 2011 UCI World Tour season.

Grega Bole, the Slovenian road race champion riding for the Lampre–ISD team, took the victory after an attack within the final 2 km (1.2 mi) of the race and managed to hold on to his advantage, as the rest of the field closed on him in the closing metres. Bole had been part of an eight-man breakaway, and held off Simon Gerrans – the winner of the race in 2009 – who took second place for Team Sky, while another previous race winner, Thomas Voeckler – the winner in 2007 – completed the podium for Team Europcar.

== Results ==
Rank	Cyclist	Team	Time	UCI World Tour Points
1	Grega Bole (SLO)	Lampre–ISD	6h 32' 40"	80
2	Simon Gerrans (AUS)	Team Sky	s.t.	60
3	Thomas Voeckler (FRA)	Team Europcar	s.t.	–
4	Thor Hushovd (NOR)	Garmin–Cervélo	s.t.	40
5	Giacomo Nizzolo (ITA)	Leopard Trek	s.t.	30
6	Arnaud Gérard (FRA)	FDJ	s.t.	–
7	José Joaquín Rojas (ESP)	Movistar Team	s.t.	14
8	Fumiyuki Beppu (JPN)	Team RadioShack	s.t.	10
9	Julien Simon (FRA)	Saur–Sojasun	s.t.	–
10	Yoann Offredo (FRA)	FDJ	s.t.	–
