= 2011 Tour of Beijing =

2011 UCI World Tour, race 25 of 26

Race details
- Dates: 5–9 October
- Stages: 5
- Distance: 613.8 km (381.4 mi)
- Winning time: 13h 39' 11"

Results
Jersey awarded to the overall winner	Winner	Tony Martin (Germany)	(HTC–Highroad)
	Second	David Millar (Great Britain)	(Garmin–Cervélo)
	Third	Chris Froome (Great Britain)	(Team Sky)
Jersey awarded to the points classification winner	Points	Denis Galimzyanov (Russia)	(Team Katusha)
Jersey awarded to the mountains classification winner	Mountains	Igor Antón (Spain)	(Euskaltel–Euskadi)
Jersey awarded to the young rider classification winner	Young rider	Ben King (United States)	(Team RadioShack)
	Team	Team Sky	

The 2011 Tour of Beijing was the inaugural running of the Tour of Beijing cycling stage race. It started with an individual time trial around the Beijing Olympic Village on 5 October and finished at the Bird's Nest on 9 October.

The race covered 614.3 kilometres (381.7 mi) across Beijing over five stages, and was the first race to be owned by Global Cycling's governing body, the Union Cycliste Internationale, a move which raised some controversy. It was the 25th race of the UCI World Tour season.

The race was won by HTC–Highroad rider Tony Martin, after winning the opening time trial stage and maintaining his advantage to the end of the race. Martin's winning margin over runner-up David Millar of Garmin–Cervélo was 17 seconds, and Team Sky's Chris Froome completed the podium, 9 seconds behind Millar and 26 seconds down on Martin. In the race's other classifications, Denis Galimzyanov of Team Katusha won the points classification, Euskaltel–Euskadi's Igor Antón won the mountains classification, Ben King finished on top of the young rider classification, with Team Sky topping the teams classification.

== Stages ==
Stage	Date	Course	Distance	Type	Winner
1	October 5	Bird's Nest to Water Cube	11.3 km (7 mi)	Individual Time Trial	Tony Martin (GER)
2	October 6	Bird's Nest to MenTouGou	133.5 km (83 mi)	Flat Stage	Heinrich Haussler (AUS)
3	October 7	MenTouGou to YongNing Town	162.0 km (101 mi)	Mountain Stage	Nicolas Roche (IRL)
4	October 8	YanQing Gui Chuan Square to Shunyi Olympic Rowing-Canoeing Park	189.5 km (118 mi)	Mountain Stage	Elia Viviani (ITA)
5	October 9	Tiananmen Square to Bird's Nest	118.0 km (73 mi)	Flat Stage	Denis Galimzyanov (RUS)

== Teams ==
As the race was held under the auspices of the UCI World Tour, all eighteen ProTour teams were invited automatically. Together with a selection of Chinese riders forming the Chinese National Cycling Team this formed the event's 19-team peloton.

The 19 teams invited to the race were:

- Ag2r–La Mondiale
- Astana
- BMC Racing Team
- Chinese National Cycling Team
- Euskaltel–Euskadi
- Garmin–Cervélo
- HTC–Highroad
- Lampre–ISD
- Leopard Trek
- Liquigas–Cannondale
- Movistar Team
- Omega Pharma–Lotto
- Quick-Step
- Rabobank
- Saxo Bank–SunGard
- Team Katusha
- Team RadioShack
- Team Sky
- Vacansoleil–DCM

== Stages ==
=== Stage 1 ===
5 October 2011 – Bird's Nest to Water Cube, 11.3 km (7.0 mi)

Stage 1 Result and General Classification after Stage 1

	Rider	Team	Time
1	Tony Martin (GER)	HTC–Highroad	13' 33"
2	David Millar (GBR)	Garmin–Cervélo	+ 17"
3	Alex Dowsett (GBR)	Team Sky	+ 24"
4	Chris Froome (GBR)	Team Sky	+ 26"
5	Steve Cummings (GBR)	Team Sky	+ 35"
6	Lars Boom (NED)	Rabobank	+ 36"
7	Olivier Kaisen (BEL)	Omega Pharma–Lotto	+ 39"
8	Luis León Sánchez (ESP)	Rabobank	+ 41"
9	Jean-Christophe Péraud (FRA)	Ag2r–La Mondiale	+ 43"
10	Dario Cataldo (ITA)	Quick-Step	+ 43"

=== Stage 2 ===
6 October 2011 – Bird's Nest to MenTouGou, 133.5 km (83.0 mi)

Stage 2 Result

	Rider	Team	Time
1	Heinrich Haussler (AUS)	Garmin–Cervélo	3h 03' 30"
2	Denis Galimzyanov (RUS)	Team Katusha	s.t.
3	Theo Bos (NED)	Rabobank	s.t.
4	Francesco Chicchi (ITA)	Quick-Step	s.t.
5	Alexander Kristoff (NOR)	BMC Racing Team	s.t.
6	Elia Viviani (ITA)	Liquigas–Cannondale	s.t.
7	Davide Appollonio (ITA)	Team Sky	s.t.
8	Giacomo Nizzolo (ITA)	Leopard Trek	s.t.
9	Manuele Mori (ITA)	Lampre–ISD	s.t.
10	Ángel Madrazo (ESP)	Movistar Team	s.t.

General Classification after Stage 2

	Rider	Team	Time
1	Tony Martin (GER)	HTC–Highroad	3h 17' 03"
2	David Millar (GBR)	Garmin–Cervélo	+ 17"
3	Alex Dowsett (GBR)	Team Sky	+ 24"
4	Chris Froome (GBR)	Team Sky	+ 26"
5	Steve Cummings (GBR)	Team Sky	+ 35"
6	Olivier Kaisen (BEL)	Omega Pharma–Lotto	+ 39"
7	Luis León Sánchez (ESP)	Rabobank	+ 41"
8	Jean-Christophe Péraud (FRA)	Ag2r–La Mondiale	+ 43"
9	Andriy Hryvko (UKR)	Astana	+ 43"
10	Dario Cataldo (ITA)	Quick-Step	+ 43"

=== Stage 3 ===
7 October 2011 – MenTouGou to YongNing Town, 162.0 km (100.7 mi)

Stage 3 Result

	Rider	Team	Time
1	Nicolas Roche (IRL)	Ag2r–La Mondiale	3h 53' 15"
2	Philip Deignan (IRL)	Team RadioShack	s.t.
3	Chris Froome (GBR)	Team Sky	+ 1"
4	Francesco Gavazzi (ITA)	Lampre–ISD	+ 1"
5	Nick Nuyens (BEL)	Saxo Bank–SunGard	+ 1"
6	Paul Martens (GER)	Rabobank	+ 1"
7	Ángel Madrazo (ESP)	Movistar Team	+ 1"
8	Simon Clarke (AUS)	Astana	+ 1"
9	Michael Barry (CAN)	Team Sky	+ 1"
10	Luke Roberts (AUS)	Saxo Bank–SunGard	+ 1"

General Classification after Stage 3

	Rider	Team	Time
1	Tony Martin (GER)	HTC–Highroad	7h 10' 19"
2	David Millar (GBR)	Garmin–Cervélo	+ 17"
3	Chris Froome (GBR)	Team Sky	+ 26"
4	Steve Cummings (GBR)	Team Sky	+ 35"
5	Olivier Kaisen (BEL)	Omega Pharma–Lotto	+ 39"
6	Luis León Sánchez (ESP)	Rabobank	+ 41"
7	Jean-Christophe Péraud (FRA)	Ag2r–La Mondiale	+ 43"
8	Andriy Hryvko (UKR)	Astana	+ 43"
9	Dario Cataldo (ITA)	Quick-Step	+ 43"
10	Niki Terpstra (NED)	Quick-Step	+ 46"

=== Stage 4 ===
8 October 2011 – YanQing Gui Chuan Square to Shunyi Olympic Rowing-Canoeing Park, 189.5 km (117.7 mi)

Stage 4 Result

	Rider	Team	Time
1	Elia Viviani (ITA)	Liquigas–Cannondale	4h 09' 08"
2	Peter Sagan (SVK)	Liquigas–Cannondale	s.t.
3	Juan José Haedo (ARG)	Saxo Bank–SunGard	s.t.
4	Denis Galimzyanov (RUS)	Team Katusha	s.t.
5	Alexander Porsev (RUS)	Team Katusha	s.t.
6	Alexander Kristoff (NOR)	BMC Racing Team	s.t.
7	Leigh Howard (AUS)	HTC–Highroad	s.t.
8	Manuele Mori (ITA)	Lampre–ISD	s.t.
9	Enrique Sanz (ESP)	Movistar Team	s.t.
10	Heinrich Haussler (AUS)	Garmin–Cervélo	s.t.

General Classification after Stage 4

	Rider	Team	Time
1	Tony Martin (GER)	HTC–Highroad	11h 19' 27"
2	David Millar (GBR)	Garmin–Cervélo	+ 17"
3	Chris Froome (GBR)	Team Sky	+ 26"
4	Steve Cummings (GBR)	Team Sky	+ 35"
5	Olivier Kaisen (BEL)	Omega Pharma–Lotto	+ 39"
6	Luis León Sánchez (ESP)	Rabobank	+ 41"
7	Jean-Christophe Péraud (FRA)	Ag2r–La Mondiale	+ 43"
8	Andriy Hryvko (UKR)	Astana	+ 43"
9	Dario Cataldo (ITA)	Quick-Step	+ 43"
10	Niki Terpstra (NED)	Quick-Step	+ 46"

=== Stage 5 ===
9 October 2011 – Tiananmen Square to Bird's Nest, 118.0 km (73.3 mi)

Stage 5 Result

	Rider	Team	Time
1	Denis Galimzyanov (RUS)	Team Katusha	2h 19' 44"
2	Juan José Haedo (ARG)	Saxo Bank–SunGard	s.t.
3	Elia Viviani (ITA)	Liquigas–Cannondale	s.t.
4	Matteo Trentin (ITA)	Quick-Step	s.t.
5	Davide Appollonio (ITA)	Team Sky	s.t.
6	Francesco Chicchi (ITA)	Quick-Step	s.t.
7	Heinrich Haussler (AUS)	Garmin–Cervélo	s.t.
8	Giacomo Nizzolo (ITA)	Leopard Trek	s.t.
9	Alexander Kristoff (NOR)	BMC Racing Team	s.t.
10	Sébastien Hinault (FRA)	Ag2r–La Mondiale	s.t.

Final General Classification

	Rider	Team	Time
1	Tony Martin (GER)	HTC–Highroad	13h 39' 11"
2	David Millar (GBR)	Garmin–Cervélo	+ 17"
3	Chris Froome (GBR)	Team Sky	+ 26"
4	Steve Cummings (GBR)	Team Sky	+ 35"
5	Olivier Kaisen (BEL)	Omega Pharma–Lotto	+ 39"
6	Luis León Sánchez (ESP)	Rabobank	+ 41"
7	Jean-Christophe Péraud (FRA)	Ag2r–La Mondiale	+ 43"
8	Andriy Hryvko (UKR)	Astana	+ 43"
9	Dario Cataldo (ITA)	Quick-Step	+ 43"
10	Niki Terpstra (NED)	Quick-Step	+ 46"

== Classification leadership ==
Stage	Winner	General classification	Mountains classification	Points classification	Young rider classification	Team Classification
1	Tony Martin	Tony Martin	no award	Tony Martin	Alex Dowsett	Team Sky
2	Heinrich Haussler	Tony Martin	Thomas De Gendt	Tony Martin	Alex Dowsett	Team Sky
3	Nicolas Roche	Tony Martin	Igor Antón	Chris Froome	Ben King	Team Sky
4	Elia Viviani	Tony Martin	Igor Antón	Denis Galimzyanov	Ben King	Team Sky
5	Denis Galimzyanov	Tony Martin	Igor Antón	Denis Galimzyanov	Ben King	Team Sky
Final		Tony Martin	Igor Antón	Denis Galimzyanov	Ben King	Team Sky
