= 2011 Grand Prix Cycliste de Québec =

2011 UCI World Tour, race 24 of 27

Race details
- Dates: 9 September 2011
- Stages: 1
- Distance: 201.6 km (125.3 mi)
- Winning time: 5h 03' 08"

Results
	Winner	Philippe Gilbert (Belgium)	(Omega Pharma–Lotto)
	Second	Robert Gesink (Netherlands)	(Rabobank)
	Third	Rigoberto Urán (Colombia)	(Team Sky)

The 2011 Grand Prix Cycliste de Québec was the second edition of the Grand Prix Cycliste de Québec, a single-day professional bicycle road race. It was held on 9 September 2011, over a distance of 201.6 km (125.3 mi), starting and finishing in Quebec City, Quebec, Canada. It was the 24th event of the 2011 UCI World Tour season.

Omega Pharma–Lotto rider Philippe Gilbert achieved his 17th race win of the season after launching several late-race attacks. Gilbert moved clear on the penultimate circuit but was pulled back to a lead group with nine other riders, before making his final move on the Côte de la Potasse and only Robert Gesink of Rabobank – who finished third in the 2010 event – remained in touch with Gilbert at the finish; finishing in the same time. Team Sky's Rigoberto Urán completed the podium, nine seconds down on Gilbert and Gesink.

Gilbert's victory also meant that he would finish the World Tour season, as the number one ranked rider after many of his closest rivals, including his nearest challenger Cadel Evans of BMC Racing Team, elected to finish their seasons early and not challenge for points in the remaining three World Tour events on the calendar.

== Course ==
The race consisted of 16 laps of a circuit 12.6 km (7.8 mi) in length, an increase of one lap from the 2010 running of the race. The circuit is well-suited for climbers and those who are used to steep descents. The finish was on an uphill climb, that was located on Grand-Allée, in the heart of Old Québec.

== Teams ==
As the race was held under the auspices of the UCI World Tour, all eighteen ProTour teams were invited automatically. Four additional wildcard invitations were given – Cofidis, FDJ, SpiderTech–C10 and Team Europcar – to form the event's 22-team peloton.

The 22 teams invited to the race were:

- Ag2r–La Mondiale
- Astana
- BMC Racing Team
- Cofidis
- Euskaltel–Euskadi
- FDJ
- Garmin–Cervélo
- HTC–Highroad
- Lampre–ISD
- Leopard Trek
- Liquigas–Cannondale
- Movistar Team
- Omega Pharma–Lotto
- Quick-Step
- Rabobank
- Saxo Bank–SunGard
- SpiderTech–C10
- Team Europcar
- Team Katusha
- Team RadioShack
- Team Sky
- Vacansoleil–DCM

== Results ==
Rank	Cyclist	Team	Time	UCI World Tour Points
1	Philippe Gilbert (BEL)	Omega Pharma–Lotto	5h 03' 08"	80
2	Robert Gesink (NED)	Rabobank	s.t.	60
3	Rigoberto Urán (COL)	Team Sky	+ 9"	50
4	Fabian Wegmann (GER)	Leopard Trek	+ 14"	40
5	Levi Leipheimer (USA)	Team RadioShack	+ 15"	30
6	Björn Leukemans (BEL)	Vacansoleil–DCM	+ 23"	22
7	Simone Ponzi (ITA)	Liquigas–Cannondale	+ 23"	14
8	Marco Marcato (ITA)	Vacansoleil–DCM	+ 25"	10
9	Gerald Ciolek (GER)	Quick-Step	+ 30"	6
10	Simon Clarke (AUS)	Astana	+ 47"	2
