= 2011 Liège–Bastogne–Liège =

2011 UCI World Tour, race 12 of 27

Race details
- Dates: 24 April 2011
- Stages: 1
- Distance: 255.5 km (158.8 mi)
- Winning time: 6h 13' 18"

Results
	Winner	Philippe Gilbert (Belgium)	(Omega Pharma–Lotto)
	Second	Fränk Schleck (Luxembourg)	(Leopard Trek)
	Third	Andy Schleck (Luxembourg)	(Leopard Trek)

The 2011 Liège–Bastogne–Liège was the 97th running of the Liège–Bastogne–Liège, a single-day cycling race. It was held on 24 April 2011 over a distance of 255.5 kilometres (158.8 miles), starting in Liège and finishing in Ans, via Bastogne in the Ardennes region of Belgium. It was the twelfth race of the 2011 UCI World Tour season.

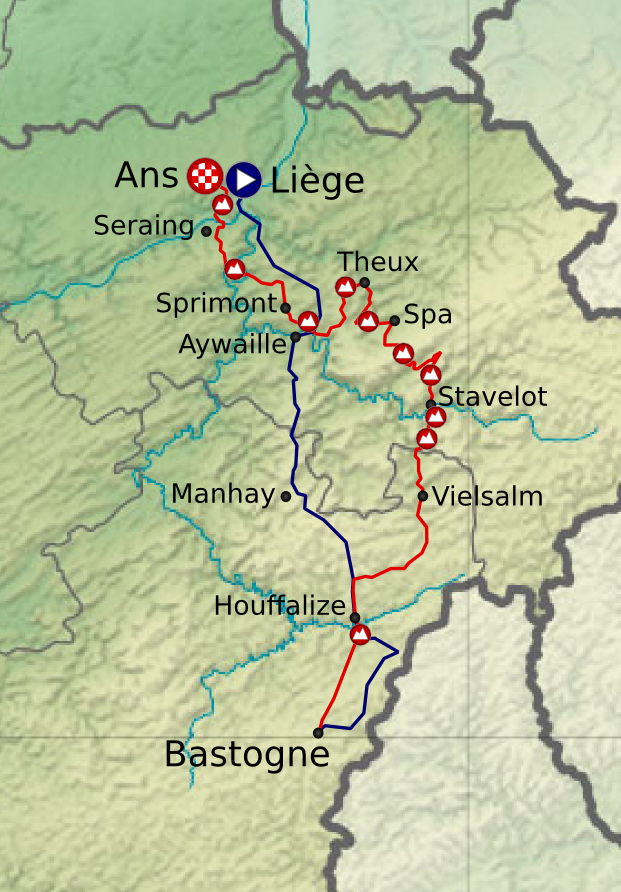
Map of the course

Philippe Gilbert of Omega Pharma–Lotto became only the second rider to win all three Ardennes classics, after Gerolsteiner rider Davide Rebellin first did so in 2004, by winning a three-man sprint to complete a run of four victories within ten days with another victory in Brabantse Pijl to go with the Ardennes classics. Gilbert outsprinted both Andy Schleck and Fränk Schleck of Leopard Trek on the final straight – to take Belgium's first victory in the race since Frank Vandenbroucke in 1999 – after the trio had escaped along with BMC Racing Team's Greg Van Avermaet with around 20 kilometres (12.4 miles) remaining. Van Avermaet was dropped, and eventually finished seventh behind the Schlecks and trio that had usurped him within the closing kilometres, Roman Kreuziger of Astana, Rigoberto Urán of Team Sky and Chris Anker Sørensen of Saxo Bank–SunGard.

== Results ==
	Cyclist	Team	Time	UCI World Tour Points
1	Philippe Gilbert (BEL)	Omega Pharma–Lotto	6h 13' 18"	100
2	Fränk Schleck (LUX)	Leopard Trek	s.t.	80
3	Andy Schleck (LUX)	Leopard Trek	s.t.	70
4	Roman Kreuziger (CZE)	Astana	+ 24"	60
5	Rigoberto Urán (COL)	Team Sky	+ 24"	50
6	Chris Anker Sørensen (DEN)	Saxo Bank–SunGard	+ 24"	40
7	Greg Van Avermaet (BEL)	BMC Racing Team	+ 27"	30
8	Vincenzo Nibali (ITA)	Liquigas–Cannondale	+ 29"	20
9	Björn Leukemans (BEL)	Vacansoleil–DCM	+ 39"	10
10	Samuel Sánchez (ESP)	Euskaltel–Euskadi	+ 39"	4
