= 2011 Grand Prix Cycliste de Montréal =

2011 UCI World Tour, race 25 of 27

Race details
- Dates: 11 September 2011
- Stages: 1
- Distance: 205.7 km (127.8 mi)
- Winning time: 5h 20' 18"

Results
	Winner	Rui Costa (Portugal)	(Movistar Team)
	Second	Pierrick Fédrigo (France)	(FDJ)
	Third	Philippe Gilbert (Belgium)	(Omega Pharma–Lotto)

The 2011 Grand Prix Cycliste de Montréal was the second edition of the Grand Prix Cycliste de Montréal, a single-day professional bicycle road race. It was held on 11 September 2011, over a distance of 205.7 km (127.8 mi), starting and finishing in Montreal, Quebec, Canada. It was the 25th event of the 2011 UCI World Tour season.

Movistar Team rider Rui Costa won the race, having attacked on the final climb of Mont Royal with several other riders and stayed away until the end, winning the sprint for the line ahead of FDJ's Pierrick Fédrigo. The other rider in the breakaway, Stefan Denifl of Leopard Trek faded in the closing stages to fifth place in the results behind the Omega Pharma–Lotto pair of Philippe Gilbert and Jürgen Roelandts.

== Course ==
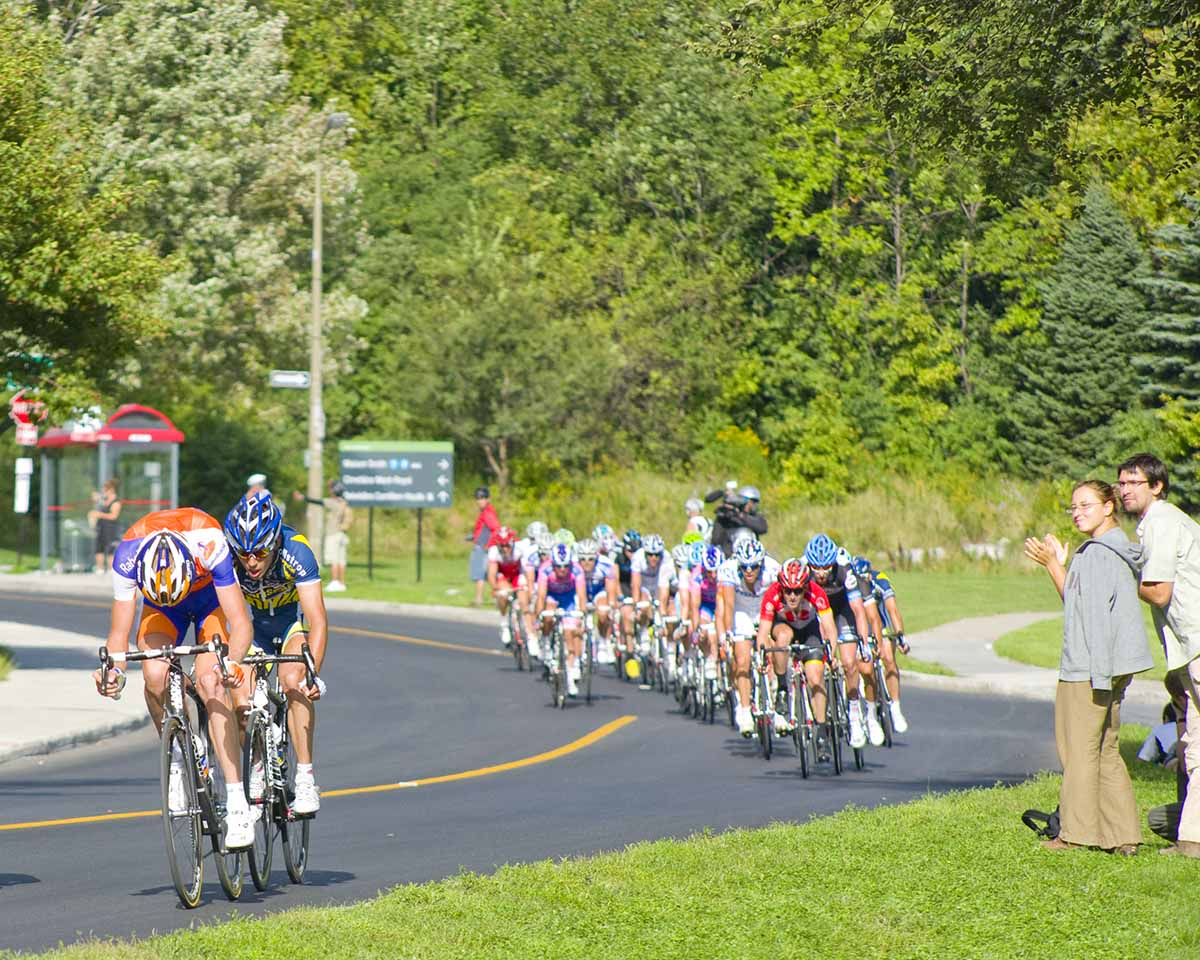
On Mont Royal

The race consisted of 17 laps of a circuit 12.1 km (7.5 mi) in length, an increase of one lap from the 2010 running of the race. The circuit, around the main campus of the Université de Montréal, was well-suited for climbers, with three climbs per lap, and those who are used to steep descents. The finish was on an uphill climb, that was located on Avenue du Parc.

== Teams ==
As the race was held under the auspices of the UCI World Tour, all eighteen ProTour teams were invited automatically. Four additional wildcard invitations were given – Cofidis, FDJ, SpiderTech–C10 and Team Europcar – to form the event's 22-team peloton.

The 22 teams invited to the race were:

- Ag2r–La Mondiale
- Astana
- BMC Racing Team
- Cofidis
- Euskaltel–Euskadi
- FDJ
- Garmin–Cervélo
- HTC–Highroad
- Lampre–ISD
- Leopard Trek
- Liquigas–Cannondale
- Movistar Team
- Omega Pharma–Lotto
- Quick-Step
- Rabobank
- Saxo Bank–SunGard
- SpiderTech–C10
- Team Europcar
- Team Katusha
- Team RadioShack
- Team Sky
- Vacansoleil–DCM

== Results ==
Rank	Cyclist	Team	Time	UCI World Tour Points
1	Rui Costa (POR)	Movistar Team	5h 20' 18"	80
2	Pierrick Fédrigo (FRA)	FDJ	s.t.	–
3	Philippe Gilbert (BEL)	Omega Pharma–Lotto	+ 2"	50
4	Jürgen Roelandts (BEL)	Omega Pharma–Lotto	+ 2"	40
5	Stefan Denifl (AUT)	Leopard Trek	+ 2"	30
6	Daniele Pietropolli (ITA)	Lampre–ISD	+ 4"	22
7	Marco Marcato (ITA)	Vacansoleil–DCM	+ 4"	14
8	Arthur Vichot (FRA)	FDJ	+ 4"	–
9	Rinaldo Nocentini (ITA)	Ag2r–La Mondiale	+ 4"	6
10	Fabian Wegmann (GER)	Leopard Trek	+ 4"	2
