= 2011 La Flèche Wallonne =

2011 UCI World Tour, race 11 of 27

Race details
- Dates: 20 April 2011
- Stages: 1
- Distance: 201 km (124.9 mi)
- Winning time: 4h 54' 57"

Results
	Winner	Philippe Gilbert (Belgium)	(Omega Pharma–Lotto)
	Second	Joaquim Rodríguez (Spain)	(Team Katusha)
	Third	Samuel Sánchez (Spain)	(Euskaltel–Euskadi)

The 2011 La Flèche Wallonne was the 75th running of La Flèche Wallonne, a single-day cycling race. It was held on 20 April 2011 over a distance of 201 kilometres (124.9 miles) between Charleroi and Huy in Belgium, and was the eleventh race of the 2011 UCI World Tour season.

As he had done in the closing stages of his winning performance at the Amstel Gold Race three days prior to La Flèche Wallonne, Omega Pharma–Lotto's Philippe Gilbert attacked on the final uphill climb – the Mur de Huy – to the finish and accelerated away from the field, gapping them by three seconds to take victory and his third classics win in the space of a week, having also won the Brabantse Pijl; the first rider to win all three in the same season. Gilbert also became the first Belgian to win La Flèche Wallonne since Mario Aerts won the race in 2002. Second place went to – just like he did in the Amstel Gold Race – Joaquim Rodríguez of Team Katusha, with Samuel Sánchez finishing third for Euskaltel–Euskadi, five seconds behind Gilbert.

== Teams ==
25 teams were selected to compete in the 2011 La Flèche Wallonne. All UCI ProTeams were represented as well as seven UCI Professional Continental teams. The teams that competed were:

- Ag2r–La Mondiale
- Astana
- BMC Racing Team
- Cofidis
- Euskaltel–Euskadi
- FDJ
- Garmin–Cervélo
- HTC–Highroad
- Lampre–ISD
- Landbouwkrediet
- Leopard Trek
- Liquigas–Cannondale
- Omega Pharma–Lotto
- Quick-Step
- Rabobank
- Saur–Sojasun
- Skil–Shimano
- Team Katusha
- Movistar Team
- Team RadioShack
- Saxo Bank–SunGard
- Team Sky
- Topsport Vlaanderen–Mercator
- Vacansoleil–DCM
- Veranda's Willems–Accent

== Results ==
	Cyclist	Team	Time	World Tour Points
1	Philippe Gilbert (BEL)	Omega Pharma–Lotto	4h 54' 57"	80
2	Joaquim Rodríguez (ESP)	Team Katusha	+ 3"	60
3	Samuel Sánchez (ESP)	Euskaltel–Euskadi	+ 5"	50
4	Alexander Vinokourov (KAZ)	Astana	+ 6"	40
5	Igor Antón (ESP)	Euskaltel–Euskadi	+ 6"	30
6	Jelle Vanendert (BEL)	Omega Pharma–Lotto	+ 6"	22
7	Fränk Schleck (LUX)	Leopard Trek	+ 6"	14
8	Daniel Moreno (ESP)	Team Katusha	+ 9"	10
9	Christophe Le Mével (FRA)	Garmin–Cervélo	+ 12"	6
10	Paul Martens (GER)	Rabobank	+ 12"	2
