= 2011 Clásica de San Sebastián =

2011 UCI World Tour, race 18 of 27

Race details
- Dates: 30 July 2011
- Stages: 1
- Distance: 234 km (145 mi)
- Winning time: 5h 48' 52"

Results
	Winner	Philippe Gilbert (Belgium)	(Omega Pharma–Lotto)
	Second	Carlos Barredo (Spain)	(Rabobank)
	Third	Greg Van Avermaet (Belgium)	(BMC Racing Team)

The 2011 Clásica de San Sebastián was the 31st edition of the Clásica de San Sebastián, a single-day cycling race. It was held on 30 July 2011, over a distance of 234 km (145.4 mi), starting and finishing in San Sebastián, in the Basque Country, Spain. It was the eighteenth event of the 2011 UCI World Tour season.

Similar to his late race attacks to win the Ardennes classics earlier in the year, Omega Pharma–Lotto's Philippe Gilbert accelerated away from the pack with 4 km (2.5 mi) remaining in the race and caught and passed Rabobank's Carlos Barredo on the road. Barredo could not hold Gilbert's pace and thus Gilbert opened up a gap of over ten seconds that he held to the finish, to secure his fourteenth victory of the season. Barredo, the 2009 Clásica de San Sebastián winner, finished second just ahead of a sprint finish for third place, won by Greg Van Avermaet for BMC Racing Team.

== Teams and riders ==
As the race was held under the auspices of the UCI World Tour, all eighteen ProTour teams were invited automatically. Three additional wildcard invitations were given – Andalucía–Caja Granada, Caja Rural and Geox–TMC – to form the event's 21-team peloton.

The 21 teams invited to the race were:

- Ag2r–La Mondiale
- Andalucía–Caja Granada
- Astana
- BMC Racing Team
- Caja Rural
- Euskaltel–Euskadi
- Garmin–Cervélo
- Geox–TMC
- HTC–Highroad
- Lampre–ISD
- Leopard Trek
- Liquigas–Cannondale
- Movistar Team
- Omega Pharma–Lotto
- Quick-Step
- Rabobank
- Saxo Bank–SunGard
- Team Katusha
- Team RadioShack
- Team Sky
- Vacansoleil–DCM

Teams consisted of up to eight riders, and 168 riders started the event. The event took place less than a week after the conclusion of the 2011 Tour de France, and many of the riders who took part in that event, contested the race.

== Results ==
	Cyclist	Team	Time	UCI World Tour Points
1	Philippe Gilbert (BEL)	Omega Pharma–Lotto	5h 48' 52"	80
2	Carlos Barredo (ESP)	Rabobank	+ 12"	60
3	Greg Van Avermaet (BEL)	BMC Racing Team	+ 14"	50
4	Joaquim Rodríguez (ESP)	Team Katusha	+ 14"	40
5	Dries Devenyns (BEL)	Quick-Step	+ 14"	30
6	Fränk Schleck (LUX)	Leopard Trek	+ 14"	22
7	Haimar Zubeldia (ESP)	Team RadioShack	+ 14"	14
8	Samuel Sánchez (ESP)	Euskaltel–Euskadi	+ 14"	10
9	Rigoberto Urán (COL)	Team Sky	+ 14"	6
10	Jelle Vanendert (BEL)	Omega Pharma–Lotto	+ 50"	2
