= 2010 Danmark Rundt =

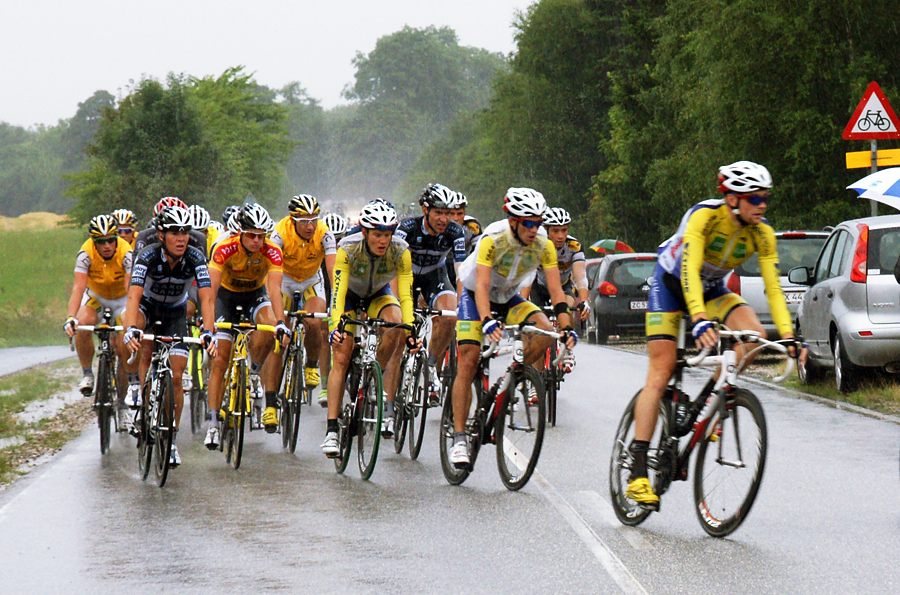
- Stage 6 with Jakob Fuglsang in yellow jersey (with red on shoulders at left)

Race details
- Dates: August 4 – 8, 2010
- Stages: 6
- Distance: 835 km (518.8 mi)
- Winning time: 19h 03' 38"

Results
Jersey awarded to the overall winner	Winner	Jakob Fuglsang (DEN)	(Team Saxo Bank)
	Second	Svein Tuft (CAN)	(Garmin-Transitions)
	Third	Matthew Busche (USA)	(Radioshack)
Jersey awarded to the points classification winner	Points	Matti Breschel (DEN)	(Team Saxo Bank)
Jersey awarded to the mountains classification winner	Mountains	Michael Reihs (DEN)	(Designa Køkken-Blue Water)
Jersey awarded to the youth classification winner	Youth	Rasmus Guldhammer (DEN)	(Team HTC Columbia)
	Team	(Denmark) Team Saxo Bank	

The 2010 Danmark Rundt was a men's road bicycle race held from 4 to 8 August 2010. Danish rider Jakob Fuglsang of Team Saxo Bank captured the overall title. This was the third Danmark Rundt victory for Fuglsang, the most in the race's history. It was the 20th edition of the men's stage race, which was established in 1985.

== Schedule ==
All stages were held within Denmark.

Stage	Route	Distance	Date	Winner
1	Holstebro > Holstebro	175 km	August 4	(Australia) Matthew Goss
2	Vildbjerg > Randers	170 km	August 5	(Belgium) Michael Van Stayen
3	Hadsten > Vejle	185 km	August 6	(Denmark) Matti Breschel
4	Nyborg > Odense	100 km	August 7	(Australia) Mark Renshaw
5	Middelfart > Middelfart	19.4 km	August 7	(Canada) Svein Tuft
6	Høng > Rudersdal	185 km	August 8	(New Zealand) Hayden Roulston

== Teams ==
15 teams were invited to the 2010 Danmark Rundt: 4 teams were from the UCI ProTeams, 6 were UCI Professional Continental Teams and 5 were UCI Continental Teams.

UCI ProTeams
- (Denmark) Team Saxo Bank
- (United States) Team HTC–Columbia
- (United States) Garmin–Transitions
- (United States) Team RadioShack
UCI Professional Continental Teams
- (Switzerland) Cervélo TestTeam
- (Netherlands) Vacansoleil
- (Italy) ISD–NERI
- (Netherlands) Skil–Shimano
- (Belgium) Topsport Vlaanderen–Mercator
- (Italy) Colnago–CSF Inox
UCI Continental Teams
- (Denmark) Glud & Marstrand–LRØ Rådgivning
- (Denmark) Team Designa Køkken–Blue Water
- (Denmark) Team Concordia Forsikring–Himmerland
- (Denmark) Team Energi Fyn
- (Denmark) Team Post Danmark

== Stages ==
=== Stage 1: Holstebro–Holstebro (175 km) ===
The 2010 Danmark Rundt started in Holstebro. It was a flat stage and it ended in a mass sprint. Some of the favorites crashed a few kilometres from the finish because of heavy rain.

Route: Holstebro–Ulfborg–Thorsminde–Lemvig–Struer–Holstebro ending with 1 lap of 4.8 km.

Stage 1 Results

#	Rider	Team	Time
1	(Australia) Matthew Goss	Team HTC–Columbia	4h04'21"
2	(Belgium) Michael Van Stayen	Topsport Vlaanderen–Mercator	s.t.
3	(Australia) Mark Renshaw	Team HTC–Columbia	s.t.
4	(Netherlands) Kenny van Hummel	Skil–Shimano	s.t.
5	(Denmark) Philip Nielsen	Team Concordia	s.t.
6	(Netherlands) Theo Bos	Cervelo Test Team	s.t.
7	(Denmark) Matti Breschel	Team Saxo Bank	s.t.
8	(Belgium) Pieter Vanspeybrouck	Topsport Vlaanderen–Mercator	s.t.
9	(Denmark) Lars Bak	Team HTC–Columbia	s.t.
10	(New Zealand) Hayden Roulston	Team HTC–Columbia	s.t.
Full result

General Classement after Stage 1

#	Rider	Team	Time
1	(Australia) Matthew Goss	Team HTC–Columbia	4h04'11"
2	(Belgium) Michael Van Stayen	Topsport Vlaanderen–Mercator	at 04"
3	(Italy) Manuel Belletti	Colnago-CSF Inox	at 04"
4	(Australia) Mark Renshaw	Team HTC–Columbia	at 06"
5	(Netherlands) Kenny van Hummel	Skil–Shimano	at 10"
6	(Denmark) Philip Nielsen	Team Concordia	at 10"
7	(Netherlands) Theo Bos	Cervelo Test Team	at 10"
8	(Denmark) Matti Breschel	Team Saxo Bank	at 10"
9	(Belgium) Pieter Vanspeybrouck	Topsport Vlaanderen–Mercator	at 10"
10	(Denmark) Lars Bak	Team HTC–Columbia	at 10"
Full result

=== Stage 2: Vildbjerg–Randers (170 km) ===
The second stage was a flat stage with some small hills, but perfect for a sprint finish.

Route: Vildbjerg–Herning–Ikast–Karup–Viborg–Bjerringbro–Randers

Stage 2 Results

#	Rider	Team	Time
1	(Belgium) Michael Van Stayen	Topsport Vlaanderen–Mercator	3h59'08"
2	(Denmark) Matti Breschel	Team Saxo Bank	s.t.
3	(Belgium) Bert De Backer	Skil–Shimano	s.t.
4	(United Kingdom) Jeremy Hunt	Cervelo Test Team	s.t.
5	(Italy) Manuel Belletti	Colnago-CSF Inox	s.t.
6	(Australia) Matthew Goss	Team HTC–Columbia	s.t.
7	(Australia) Mark Renshaw	Team HTC–Columbia	s.t.
8	(United States) Tyler Farrar	Garmin-Transitions	s.t.
9	(Denmark) Rasmus Guldhammer	Team HTC–Columbia	s.t.
10	(Italy) Sacha Modolo	Colnago-CSF Inox	s.t.
Full result

General Classement after Stage 2

#	Rider	Team	Time
1	(Belgium) Michael Van Stayen	Topsport Vlaanderen–Mercator	8h03'13"
2	(Australia) Matthew Goss	Team HTC–Columbia	at 05"
3	(Denmark) Matti Breschel	Team Saxo Bank	at 10"
4	(Italy) Manuel Belletti	Colnago-CSF Inox	at 10"
5	(Australia) Mark Renshaw	Team HTC–Columbia	at 11"
6	(Belgium) Bert De Backer	Skil–Shimano	at 12"
7	(Denmark) Rasmus Guldhammer	Team HTC–Columbia	at 16"
8	(Netherlands) Koen de Kort	Skil–Shimano	at 16"
9	(Denmark) Lars Bak	Team HTC–Columbia	at 16"
10	(Denmark) Jakob Fuglsang	Team Saxo Bank	at 16"
Full result

=== Stage 3: Hadsten–Vejle (185 km) ===
The third stage was the king stage of 2010 Post Danmark Rundt.

Route: Hadsten–Hammel–Gjern–Silkeborg–Yding Skovhøj–Uldum–Vejle

Stage 3 Results

#	Rider	Team	Time
1	(Denmark) Matti Breschel	Team Saxo Bank	4h26'12"
2	(Denmark) Jakob Fuglsang	Team Saxo Bank	s.t.
3	(Netherlands) Joost van Leijen	Vacansoleil	at 17"
4	(Denmark) Troels Rønning Vinther	Glud & Marstrand	at 21"
5	(Spain) Xavier Florencio	Cervelo Test Team	at 22"
6	(Russia) Sergey Firsanov	Team Designa Køkken	at 22"
7	(Netherlands) Koen de Kort	Skil–Shimano	at 25"
8	(Australia) Richie Porte	Team Saxo Bank	at 25"
9	(Canada) Svein Tuft	Garmin-Transitions	at 25"
10	(Belgium) Sep Vanmarcke	Topsport Vlaanderen–Mercator	at 28"
Full result

General Classement after Stage 3

#	Rider	Team	Time
1	(Denmark) Matti Breschel	Team Saxo Bank	12h29'25"
2	(Denmark) Jakob Fuglsang	Team Saxo Bank	at 10"
3	(Netherlands) Joost van Leijen	Vacansoleil	at 29"
4	(Spain) Xavier Florencio	Cervelo Test Team	at 38"
5	(Russia) Sergey Firsanov	Team Designa Køkken	at 38"
6	(Netherlands) Koen de Kort	Skil–Shimano	at 41"
7	(Canada) Svein Tuft	Garmin-Transitions	at 41"
8	(Belgium) Sep Vanmarcke	Topsport Vlaanderen–Mercator	at 41"
9	(Denmark) Martin Mortensen	Vacansoleil	at 45"
10	(Denmark) Rasmus Guldhammer	Team HTC–Columbia	at 48"
Full result

=== Stage 4: Nyborg–Odense (105 km) ===
A short sprinters stage, with the race moving to Funen.

Route: Nyborg–Kerteminde–Munkebo–Langeskov–Odense

Stage 4 Results

#	Rider	Team	Time
1	(Australia) Mark Renshaw	Team HTC–Columbia	2h07'18"
2	(Australia) Matthew Goss	Team HTC–Columbia	s.t.
3	(Netherlands) Theo Bos	Cervelo Test Team	s.t.
4	(Netherlands) Pim Ligthart	Vacansoleil	at 2"
5	(Italy) Pierpaolo De Negri	ISD-Neri	at 2"
6	(Italy) Sacha Modolo	Colnago-CSF Inox	at 2"
7	(Netherlands) Kenny van Hummel	Skil Shimano	at 2"
8	(Belgium) Gorik Gardeyn	Vacansoleil	at 2"
9	(Denmark) Marc Hester	Team Post Danmark	at 2"
10	(Denmark) Matti Breschel	Team Saxo Bank	at 2"
Full result

General Classement after Stage 4

#	Rider	Team	Time
1	(Denmark) Matti Breschel	Team Saxo Bank	14h36'45"
2	(Denmark) Jakob Fuglsang	Team Saxo Bank	at 10"
3	(Netherlands) Joost van Leijen	Vacansoleil	at 29"
4	(Spain) Xavier Florencio	Cervelo Test Team	at 38"
5	(Russia) Sergey Firsanov	Team Designa Køkken	at 38"
6	(Netherlands) Koen de Kort	Skil–Shimano	at 41"
7	(Canada) Svein Tuft	Garmin-Transitions	at 41"
8	(Belgium) Sep Vanmarcke	Topsport Vlaanderen–Mercator	at 41"
9	(Denmark) Martin Mortensen	Vacansoleil	at 45"
10	(Denmark) Rasmus Guldhammer	Team HTC–Columbia	at 48"
Full result

=== Stage 5: Middelfart (19,4 km) ===
The fifth stage was the only individual time trial in the 2011 race. It took place around Middelfart on Funen.

Stage 5 Results

#	Rider	Team	Time
1	(Canada) Svein Tuft	Garmin-Transitions	23'20"
2	(Australia) Richie Porte	Team Saxo Bank	00"
3	(Denmark) Jakob Fuglsang	Team Saxo Bank	04"
4	(Netherlands) Lieuwe Westra	Vacansoleil	15"
5	(New Zealand) Hayden Roulston	Team HTC–Columbia	38"
6	(Germany) Patrick Gretsch	Team HTC–Columbia	39"
7	(Sweden) Alexander Wetterhall	Cervelo Test Team	44"
8	(New Zealand) Jesse Sergent	Radioshack	50"
9	(Denmark) Michael Mørkøv	Team Saxo Bank	51"
10	(Netherlands) Jens Mouris	Vacansoleil	56"
Full result

General Classement after Stage 5

#	Rider	Team	Time
1	(Denmark) Jakob Fuglsang	Team Saxo Bank	15h00'19"
2	(Canada) Svein Tuft	Garmin-Transitions	at 27"
3	(United States) Matthew Busche	Radioshack	at 1'35"
4	(Denmark) Martin Mortensen	Vacansoleil	at 1'38"
5	(Denmark) Rasmus Guldhammer	Team HTC–Columbia	at 1'45"
6	(Denmark) Matti Breschel	Team Saxo Bank	at 1'45"
7	(Russia) Sergey Firsanov	Team Designa Køkken	at 1'45"
8	(Denmark) Lars Bak	Team HTC–Columbia	at 1'48"
9	(Ukraine) Maxim Belkov	ISD-Neri	at 1'51"
10	(Netherlands) Joost van Leijen	Vacansoleil	at 1'59"
Full result

=== Stage 6: Høng–Rudersdal (185 km) ===
The last stage followed the same route was the 2011 UCI World Championship.

Route: Høng–Dianalund–Merløse–Skibby–Frederikssund–Farum–Rudersdal

Stage 6 Results

#	Rider	Team	Time
1	(New Zealand) Hayden Roulston	Team HTC–Columbia	4h03'17"
2	(Denmark) Matti Breschel	Team Saxo Bank	at 2"
3	(Italy) Manuel Belletti	Colnago-CSF Inox	at 2"
4	(Ukraine) Maxim Belkov	ISD-Neri	at 2"
5	(New Zealand) Clinton Avery	Radioshack	at 2"
6	(United States) Tyler Farrar	Garmin-Transitions	at 2"
7	(Australia) Mark Renshaw	Team HTC–Columbia	at 2"
8	(Belgium) Bert De Backer	Skil–Shimano	at 2"
9	(Netherlands) Joost van Leijen	Vacansoleil	at 2"
10	(Netherlands) Theo Bos	Cervelo Test Team	at 2"
Full result

General Classement

#	Rider	Team	Time
1	(Denmark) Jakob Fuglsang	Team Saxo Bank	19h03'38"
2	(Canada) Svein Tuft	Garmin-Transitions	at 27"
3	(United States) Matthew Busche	Radioshack	at 1'35"
4	(Denmark) Martin Mortensen	Vacansoleil	at 1'38"
5	(Denmark) Matti Breschel	Team Saxo Bank	at 1'39"
6	(Denmark) Rasmus Guldhammer	Team Saxo Bank	at 1'45"
7	(Russia) Sergey Firsanov	Team Designa Køkken	at 1'45"
8	(Denmark) Lars Bak	Team HTC–Columbia	at 1'48"
9	(Ukraine) Maxim Belkov	ISD-Neri	at 1'51"
10	(Netherlands) Joost van Leijen	Vacansoleil	at 1'59"
Full result

== Classification leadership ==
Stage	Winner	General classification	Points classification	Mountains classification	Young rider classification	Team classification
1	Matthew Goss	Matthew Goss	Matthew Goss	Manuel Belletti	Michael Van Stayen	Team HTC–Columbia
2	Michael Van Stayen	Michael Van Stayen	Michael Van Stayen	Michael Tronborg Kristensen	Michael Van Stayen	Team HTC–Columbia
3	Matti Breschel	Matti Breschel	Matti Breschel	Michael Tronborg Kristensen	Sep Vanmarcke	Team Saxo Bank
4	Mark Renshaw	Matti Breschel	Matti Breschel	Michael Tronborg Kristensen	Sep Vanmarcke	Team Saxo Bank
5	Svein Tuft	Jakob Fuglsang	Matti Breschel	Michael Tronborg Kristensen	Rasmus Guldhammer	Team Saxo Bank
6	Hayden Roulston	Jakob Fuglsang	Matti Breschel	Michael Reihs	Rasmus Guldhammer	Team Saxo Bank
Final		Jakob Fuglsang	Matti Breschel	Michael Reihs	Rasmus Guldhammer	Team Saxo Bank
