= 2011 Eneco Tour =

2011 UCI World Tour, race 20 of 27
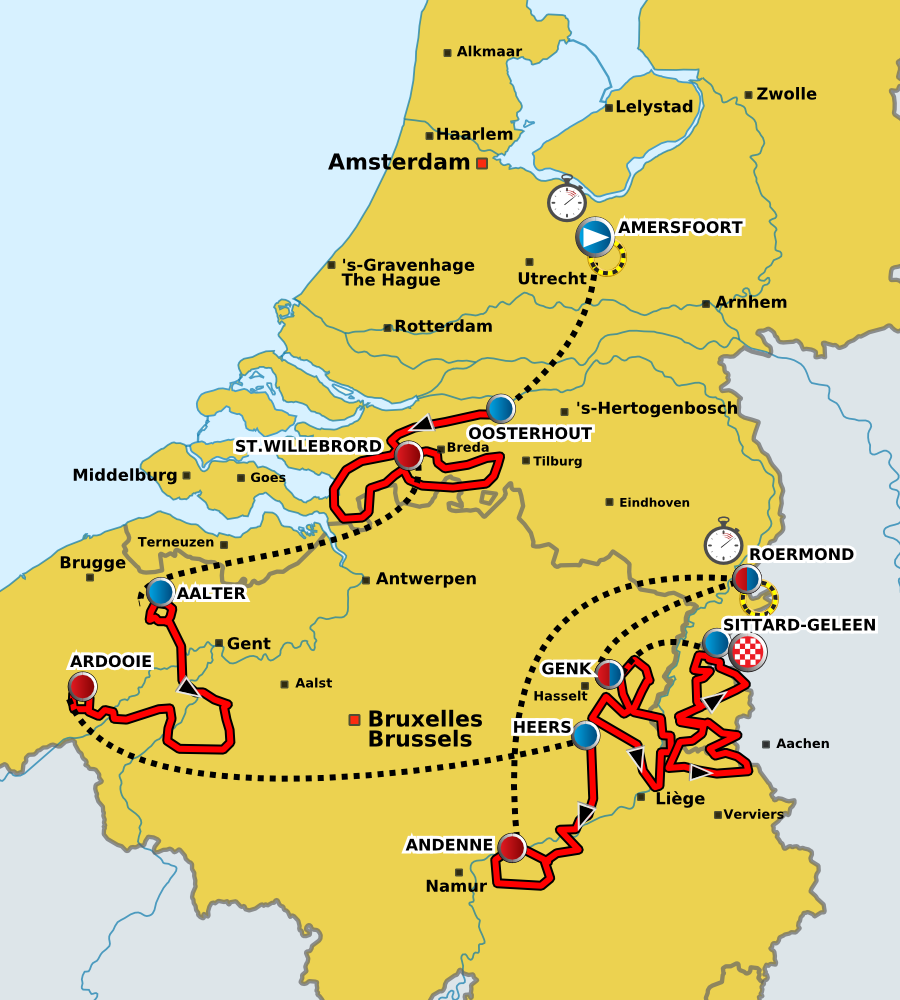

Race details
- Dates: 8–14 August 2011
- Stages: 6+Prologue
- Distance: 967.8 km (601.4 mi)
- Winning time: 22h 54' 22"

Results
Jersey awarded to the overall winner	Winner	Edvald Boasson Hagen (Norway)	(Team Sky)
	Second	Philippe Gilbert (Belgium)	(Omega Pharma–Lotto)
	Third	David Millar (Great Britain)	(Garmin–Cervélo)
Jersey awarded to the points classification winner	Points	Edvald Boasson Hagen (Norway)	(Team Sky)
Jersey awarded to the young rider classification winner	Young rider	Edvald Boasson Hagen (Norway)	(Team Sky)
	Team	Team RadioShack	

The 2011 Eneco Tour was the seventh running of the Eneco Tour cycling stage race. It started with an individual time trial in Amersfoort in the Netherlands on 8 August and finished on 14 August 2011 in Sittard-Geleen, also in the Netherlands.

The race consisted of seven stages, including the race-commencing prologue, as well as another individual time trial held in Roermond in the Netherlands. It was the 20th race of the 2011 UCI World Tour season. The race was held one week earlier than during the previous season and also one day less in length. Like the previous years, parts of the Netherlands and Belgium were covered.

The race was won by Team Sky rider Edvald Boasson Hagen, who claimed the leader's white jersey for the second time in three years – after his previous triumph in 2009 – after a strong finish on the individual time trial stage, and maintained his advantage to the end of the race, winning the race's final stage in Sittard-Geleen. Boasson Hagen's winning margin over runner-up Philippe Gilbert of Omega Pharma–Lotto was 22 seconds, and Garmin–Cervélo's David Millar completed the podium, 6 seconds behind Gilbert and 28 seconds down on Boasson Hagen.

Boasson Hagen also played a prominent part in the other classifications, as six top-ten placings over the week earned him victory in the points classification, while his overall triumph also meant victory in the young rider classification. Team RadioShack finished on top of the teams classification, after finishing tied with Team Sky in the standings. Team Sky had originally been classed as winners by a second, but a protest from Team RadioShack general manager Dirk Demol, overturned a one-second split in the field and Team RadioShack won the countback on time trial timings.

== Schedule ==
Stage	Route	Distance	Date	Winner
P (ITT)	Amersfoort (Netherlands)	5.7 km	Monday, August 8	Taylor Phinney (USA)
1	Oosterhout (Netherlands) to Sint Willebrord (Netherlands)	192.1 km	Tuesday, August 9	André Greipel (GER)
2	Aalter (Belgium) to Ardooie (Belgium)	173.7 km	Wednesday, August 10	André Greipel (GER)
3	Heers (Belgium) to Andenne (Belgium)	191.2 km	Thursday, August 11	Philippe Gilbert (BEL)
4 (ITT)	Roermond (Netherlands)	14.7 km	Friday, August 12	Jesse Sergent (NZL)
5	Genk (Belgium) to Genk (Belgium)	189.2 km	Saturday, August 13	Matteo Bono (ITA)
6	Sittard-Geleen (Netherlands) to Sittard-Geleen (Netherlands)	201.2 km	Sunday, August 14	Edvald Boasson Hagen (NOR)

== Teams ==
The 18 teams from the UCI World Tour automatically take part in this edition of the Eneco Tour.

- Ag2r–La Mondiale
- Astana
- BMC Racing Team
- Euskaltel–Euskadi
- Garmin–Cervélo
- HTC–Highroad
- Lampre–ISD
- Leopard Trek
- Liquigas–Cannondale
- Omega Pharma–Lotto
- Quick-Step
- Rabobank
- Saxo Bank–SunGard
- Team Katusha
- Movistar Team
- Team RadioShack
- Team Sky
- Vacansoleil–DCM

4 teams have been awarded a wildcard; Topsport Vlaanderen–Mercator on 10 June, Skil–Shimano on 24 June and on 14 July, Cofidis and Veranda's Willems–Accent.

== Stages ==
=== Prologue ===
8 August 2011 – Amersfoort (Netherlands), 5.7 km (3.5 mi) individual time trial (ITT)

Prologue Result and General Classification after Prologue

	Rider	Team	Time
1	Taylor Phinney (USA)	BMC Racing Team	6' 57"
2	Edvald Boasson Hagen (NOR)	Team Sky	+ 7"
3	David Millar (GBR)	Garmin–Cervélo	+ 8"
4	Alex Rasmussen (DEN)	HTC–Highroad	+ 9"
5	Lars Boom (NED)	Rabobank	+ 10"
6	Jos van Emden (NED)	Rabobank	+ 11"
7	Jesse Sergent (NZL)	Team RadioShack	+ 12"
8	Philippe Gilbert (BEL)	Omega Pharma–Lotto	+ 15"
9	Geraint Thomas (GBR)	Team Sky	+ 18"
10	Robert Wagner (GER)	Leopard Trek	+ 18"

=== Stage 1 ===
9 August 2011 – Oosterhout (Netherlands) to Sint Willebrord (Netherlands), 192.1 km (119.4 mi)

Stage 1 Result

	Cyclist	Team	Time
1	André Greipel (GER)	Omega Pharma–Lotto	4h 21' 20"
2	Denis Galimzyanov (RUS)	Team Katusha	s.t.
3	Tyler Farrar (USA)	Garmin–Cervélo	s.t.
4	Theo Bos (NED)	Rabobank	s.t.
5	Tom Veelers (NED)	Skil–Shimano	s.t.
6	Edvald Boasson Hagen (NOR)	Team Sky	s.t.
7	Taylor Phinney (USA)	BMC Racing Team	s.t.
8	Mirko Selvaggi (ITA)	Vacansoleil–DCM	s.t.
9	Gerald Ciolek (GER)	Quick-Step	s.t.
10	Grega Bole (SLO)	Lampre–ISD	s.t.

General Classification after Stage 1

	Rider	Team	Time
1	Taylor Phinney (USA)	BMC Racing Team	4h 28' 17"
2	Edvald Boasson Hagen (NOR)	Team Sky	+ 7"
3	David Millar (GBR)	Garmin–Cervélo	+ 8"
4	Alex Rasmussen (DEN)	HTC–Highroad	+ 9"
5	Lars Boom (NED)	Rabobank	+ 10"
6	Jos van Emden (NED)	Rabobank	+ 11"
7	Jesse Sergent (NZL)	Team RadioShack	+ 12"
8	Philippe Gilbert (BEL)	Omega Pharma–Lotto	+ 15"
9	Geraint Thomas (GBR)	Team Sky	+ 18"
10	Robert Wagner (GER)	Leopard Trek	+ 18"

=== Stage 2 ===
10 August 2011 – Aalter (Belgium) to Ardooie (Belgium), 173.7 km (107.9 mi)

Stage 2 Result

	Cyclist	Team	Time
1	André Greipel (GER)	Omega Pharma–Lotto	4h 07' 21"
2	Tyler Farrar (USA)	Garmin–Cervélo	s.t.
3	Edvald Boasson Hagen (NOR)	Team Sky	s.t.
4	Jempy Drucker (LUX)	Veranda's Willems–Accent	s.t.
5	Baden Cooke (AUS)	Saxo Bank–SunGard	s.t.
6	Taylor Phinney (USA)	BMC Racing Team	s.t.
7	Tom Veelers (NED)	Skil–Shimano	s.t.
8	Grega Bole (SLO)	Lampre–ISD	s.t.
9	Michael Van Staeyen (BEL)	Topsport Vlaanderen–Mercator	s.t.
10	Mark Renshaw (AUS)	HTC–Highroad	s.t.

General Classification after Stage 2

	Rider	Team	Time
1	Taylor Phinney (USA)	BMC Racing Team	8h 35' 38"
2	Edvald Boasson Hagen (NOR)	Team Sky	+ 3"
3	David Millar (GBR)	Garmin–Cervélo	+ 8"
4	Alex Rasmussen (DEN)	HTC–Highroad	+ 9"
5	André Greipel (GER)	Omega Pharma–Lotto	+ 10"
6	Lars Boom (NED)	Rabobank	+ 10"
7	Jos van Emden (NED)	Rabobank	+ 11"
8	Jesse Sergent (NZL)	Team RadioShack	+ 12"
9	Philippe Gilbert (BEL)	Omega Pharma–Lotto	+ 15"
10	Tyler Farrar (USA)	Garmin–Cervélo	+ 17"

=== Stage 3 ===
11 August 2011 – Heers (Belgium) to Andenne (Belgium), 191.2 km (118.8 mi)

Stage 3 Result

	Cyclist	Team	Time
1	Philippe Gilbert (BEL)	Omega Pharma–Lotto	4h 54' 53"
2	Grega Bole (SLO)	Lampre–ISD	+ 8"
3	Ben Hermans (BEL)	Team RadioShack	+ 8"
4	Koen de Kort (NED)	Skil–Shimano	+ 8"
5	Linus Gerdemann (GER)	Leopard Trek	+ 8"
6	Zdeněk Štybar (CZE)	Quick-Step	+ 8"
7	Dries Devenyns (BEL)	Quick-Step	+ 8"
8	Lars Bak (DEN)	HTC–Highroad	+ 8"
9	Edvald Boasson Hagen (NOR)	Team Sky	+ 8"
10	Greg Van Avermaet (BEL)	BMC Racing Team	+ 8"

General Classification after Stage 3

	Rider	Team	Time
1	Philippe Gilbert (BEL)	Omega Pharma–Lotto	13h 30' 34"
2	Edvald Boasson Hagen (NOR)	Team Sky	+ 5"
3	David Millar (GBR)	Garmin–Cervélo	+ 13"
4	Dominique Cornu (BEL)	Topsport Vlaanderen–Mercator	+ 23"
5	Ben Hermans (BEL)	Team RadioShack	+ 25"
6	Grega Bole (SLO)	Lampre–ISD	+ 32"
7	Lars Bak (DEN)	HTC–Highroad	+ 34"
8	Taylor Phinney (USA)	BMC Racing Team	+ 34"
9	Dries Devenyns (BEL)	Quick-Step	+ 35"
10	Joost van Leijen (NED)	Vacansoleil–DCM	+ 36"

=== Stage 4 ===
12 August 2011 – Roermond (Netherlands), 14.7 km (9.1 mi) individual time trial (ITT)

Stage 4 Result

	Cyclist	Team	Time
1	Jesse Sergent (NZL)	Team RadioShack	17' 55"
2	Alex Rasmussen (DEN)	HTC–Highroad	+ 14"
3	Jürgen Roelandts (BEL)	Omega Pharma–Lotto	+ 20"
4	Vladimir Isaichev (RUS)	Team Katusha	+ 27"
5	Lars Boom (NED)	Rabobank	+ 27"
6	Jens Mouris (NED)	Vacansoleil–DCM	+ 30"
7	Maarten Tjallingii (NED)	Rabobank	+ 30"
8	Taylor Phinney (USA)	BMC Racing Team	+ 30"
9	Edvald Boasson Hagen (NOR)	Team Sky	+ 32"
10	Bert Grabsch (GER)	HTC–Highroad	+ 34"

General Classification after Stage 4

	Rider	Team	Time
1	Edvald Boasson Hagen (NOR)	Team Sky	13h 49' 06"
2	Philippe Gilbert (BEL)	Omega Pharma–Lotto	+ 12"
3	David Millar (GBR)	Garmin–Cervélo	+ 18"
4	Taylor Phinney (USA)	BMC Racing Team	+ 27"
5	Jos van Emden (NED)	Rabobank	+ 47"
6	Joost van Leijen (NED)	Vacansoleil–DCM	+ 54"
7	Dominique Cornu (BEL)	Topsport Vlaanderen–Mercator	+ 57"
8	Dries Devenyns (BEL)	Quick-Step	+ 58"
9	Ben Hermans (BEL)	Team RadioShack	+ 59"
10	Linus Gerdemann (GER)	Leopard Trek	+ 1' 03"

=== Stage 5 ===
13 August 2011 – Genk (Belgium) to Genk (Belgium), 189.2 km (117.6 mi)

Stage 5 Result

	Cyclist	Team	Time
1	Matteo Bono (ITA)	Lampre–ISD	4h 12' 14"
2	Sergey Renev (KAZ)	Astana	s.t.
3	Artem Ovechkin (RUS)	Team Katusha	+ 3"
4	Tomas Vaitkus (LTU)	Astana	+ 6"
5	Jürgen Roelandts (BEL)	Omega Pharma–Lotto	+ 6"
6	Denis Galimzyanov (RUS)	Team Katusha	+ 6"
7	Kenny van Hummel (NED)	Skil–Shimano	+ 6"
8	Jacopo Guarnieri (ITA)	Liquigas–Cannondale	+ 6"
9	Robbie McEwen (AUS)	Team RadioShack	+ 6"
10	Taylor Phinney (USA)	BMC Racing Team	+ 6"

General Classification after Stage 5

	Rider	Team	Time
1	Edvald Boasson Hagen (NOR)	Team Sky	18h 01' 26"
2	Philippe Gilbert (BEL)	Omega Pharma–Lotto	+ 12"
3	David Millar (GBR)	Garmin–Cervélo	+ 18"
4	Taylor Phinney (USA)	BMC Racing Team	+ 25"
5	Jos van Emden (NED)	Rabobank	+ 47"
6	Joost van Leijen (NED)	Vacansoleil–DCM	+ 54"
7	Dominique Cornu (BEL)	Topsport Vlaanderen–Mercator	+ 57"
8	Dries Devenyns (BEL)	Quick-Step	+ 58"
9	Ben Hermans (BEL)	Team RadioShack	+ 59"
10	Linus Gerdemann (GER)	Leopard Trek	+ 1' 03"

=== Stage 6 ===
14 August 2011 – Sittard-Geleen (Netherlands) to Sittard-Geleen (Netherlands), 201.2 km (125.0 mi)

Stage 6 Result

	Cyclist	Team	Time
1	Edvald Boasson Hagen (NOR)	Team Sky	4h 53' 06"
2	Manuel Antonio Cardoso (POR)	Team RadioShack	s.t.
3	Lars Boom (NED)	Rabobank	s.t.
4	Grega Bole (SLO)	Lampre–ISD	s.t.
5	Damiano Caruso (ITA)	Liquigas–Cannondale	s.t.
6	Andreas Stauff (GER)	Quick-Step	s.t.
7	Tomas Vaitkus (LTU)	Astana	s.t.
8	Simone Ponzi (ITA)	Liquigas–Cannondale	s.t.
9	Koen de Kort (NED)	Skil–Shimano	s.t.
10	Vladimir Gusev (RUS)	Team Katusha	s.t.

Final General Classification

	Rider	Team	Time
1	Edvald Boasson Hagen (NOR)	Team Sky	22h 54' 22"
2	Philippe Gilbert (BEL)	Omega Pharma–Lotto	+ 22"
3	David Millar (GBR)	Garmin–Cervélo	+ 28"
4	Taylor Phinney (USA)	BMC Racing Team	+ 35"
5	Jos van Emden (NED)	Rabobank	+ 57"
6	Joost van Leijen (NED)	Vacansoleil–DCM	+ 1' 04"
7	Dominique Cornu (BEL)	Topsport Vlaanderen–Mercator	+ 1' 07"
8	Dries Devenyns (BEL)	Quick-Step	+ 1' 08"
9	Ben Hermans (BEL)	Team RadioShack	+ 1' 09"
10	Linus Gerdemann (GER)	Leopard Trek	+ 1' 13"

== Final standings ==
=== General classification ===
	Rider	Team	Time
1	Edvald Boasson Hagen (NOR)	Team Sky	22h 54' 22"
2	Philippe Gilbert (BEL)	Omega Pharma–Lotto	+ 22"
3	David Millar (GBR)	Garmin–Cervélo	+ 28"
4	Taylor Phinney (USA)	BMC Racing Team	+ 35"
5	Jos van Emden (NED)	Rabobank	+ 57"
6	Joost van Leijen (NED)	Vacansoleil–DCM	+ 1' 04"
7	Dominique Cornu (BEL)	Topsport Vlaanderen–Mercator	+ 1' 07"
8	Dries Devenyns (BEL)	Quick-Step	+ 1' 08"
9	Ben Hermans (BEL)	Team RadioShack	+ 1' 09"
10	Linus Gerdemann (GER)	Leopard Trek	+ 1' 13"

=== Points classification ===
	Rider	Team	Points
1	Edvald Boasson Hagen (NOR)	Team Sky	122
2	Taylor Phinney (USA)	BMC Racing Team	85
3	André Greipel (GER)	Omega Pharma–Lotto	68
4	Grega Bole (SLO)	Lampre–ISD	66
5	Lars Boom (NED)	Rabobank	56
6	Philippe Gilbert (BEL)	Omega Pharma–Lotto	47
7	Jesse Sergent (NZL)	Team RadioShack	43
8	Jürgen Roelandts (BEL)	Omega Pharma–Lotto	42
9	Julien Fouchard (FRA)	Cofidis	40
10	Denis Galimzyanov (RUS)	Team Katusha	40

=== Young Riders' classification ===
	Rider	Team	Time
1	Edvald Boasson Hagen (NOR)	Team Sky	22h 54' 22"
2	Taylor Phinney (USA)	BMC Racing Team	+ 35"
3	Ben Hermans (BEL)	Team RadioShack	+ 1' 09"
4	Damiano Caruso (ITA)	Liquigas–Cannondale	+ 2' 04"
5	Maxime Vantomme (BEL)	Team Katusha	+ 2' 19"
6	Simone Ponzi (ITA)	Liquigas–Cannondale	+ 2' 36"
7	Pieter Jacobs (BEL)	Topsport Vlaanderen–Mercator	+ 2' 43"
8	Romain Zingle (BEL)	Cofidis	+ 2' 48"
9	Michael Schär (SUI)	BMC Racing Team	+ 3' 06"
10	Laurens De Vreese (BEL)	Topsport Vlaanderen–Mercator	+ 3' 07"

=== Team classification ===
	Team	Points
1	Team RadioShack	68h 45' 24"
2	Team Sky	+ 0"
3	Rabobank	+ 22"
4	BMC Racing Team	+ 2' 11"
5	Team Katusha	+ 2' 13"
6	Leopard Trek	+ 2' 35"
7	Quick-Step	+ 2' 36"
8	Lampre–ISD	+ 2' 55"
9	Topsport Vlaanderen–Mercator	+ 3' 39"
10	Cofidis	+ 4' 19"

== Classification leadership table ==
Stage	Winner	General classification	Points classification	Young Rider Classification	Team classification
P	Taylor Phinney	Taylor Phinney	Taylor Phinney	Taylor Phinney	Rabobank
1	André Greipel	Taylor Phinney	Taylor Phinney	Taylor Phinney	Rabobank
2	André Greipel	Taylor Phinney	Edvald Boasson Hagen	Taylor Phinney	Rabobank
3	Philippe Gilbert	Philippe Gilbert	Edvald Boasson Hagen	Edvald Boasson Hagen	Team Sky
4	Jesse Sergent	Edvald Boasson Hagen	Edvald Boasson Hagen	Edvald Boasson Hagen	Team RadioShack
5	Matteo Bono	Edvald Boasson Hagen	Edvald Boasson Hagen	Edvald Boasson Hagen	Team RadioShack
6	Edvald Boasson Hagen	Edvald Boasson Hagen	Edvald Boasson Hagen	Edvald Boasson Hagen	Team RadioShack
Final		Edvald Boasson Hagen	Edvald Boasson Hagen	Edvald Boasson Hagen	Team RadioShack

== World rankings points ==
The Eneco Tour was one of 27 events throughout the season that contributed points towards the 2011 UCI World Tour. Points were awarded to the top 10 finishers overall, and to the top five finishers in each stage. Only riders on UCI ProTour teams were eligible to receive rankings points.

Points earned in the Eneco Tour
Name	Team	Points
Edvald Boasson Hagen (NOR)	Team Sky	112
Philippe Gilbert (BEL)	Omega Pharma–Lotto	86
David Millar (GBR)	Garmin–Cervélo	72
Taylor Phinney (USA)	BMC Racing Team	66
Jos van Emden (NED)	Rabobank	50
Joost van Leijen (NED)	Vacansoleil–DCM	40
Dries Devenyns (BEL)	Quick-Step	20
Ben Hermans (BEL)	Liquigas–Cannondale	12
André Greipel (GER)	Omega Pharma–Lotto	12

Matteo Bono (ITA)	Lampre–ISD	6
Tyler Farrar (USA)	Garmin–Cervélo	6
Jesse Sergent (NZL)	Team RadioShack	6
Grega Bole (SLO)	Lampre–ISD	5
Linus Gerdemann (GER)	Leopard Trek	5
Alex Rasmussen (DEN)	HTC–Highroad	5
Lars Boom (NED)	Rabobank	4
Manuel Antonio Cardoso (POR)	Team RadioShack	4
Denis Galimzyanov (RUS)	Team Katusha	4
Sergey Renev (KAZ)	Astana	4
Jürgen Roelandts (BEL)	Omega Pharma–Lotto	3
Artem Ovechkin (RUS)	Team Katusha	2
Theo Bos (NED)	Rabobank	1
Damiano Caruso (ITA)	Liquigas–Cannondale	1
Baden Cooke (AUS)	Saxo Bank–SunGard	1
Vladimir Isaichev (RUS)	Team Katusha	1
Tomas Vaitkus (LTU)	Astana	1

Top ten of the individual standings after the Eneco Tour
Rank	Prev.	Name	Team	Points
1	1	Cadel Evans (AUS)	BMC Racing Team	574
2	2	Philippe Gilbert (BEL)	Omega Pharma–Lotto	568
3	3	Alberto Contador (ESP)	Saxo Bank–SunGard	471
4	4	Michele Scarponi (ITA)	Lampre–ISD	348
5	5	Joaquim Rodríguez (ESP)	Team Katusha	328
6	6	Samuel Sánchez (ESP)	Euskaltel–Euskadi	307
7	7	Fränk Schleck (LUX)	Leopard Trek	284
8	8	Andy Schleck (LUX)	Leopard Trek	252
9	9	Fabian Cancellara (SUI)	Leopard Trek	250
10	10	Alexander Vinokourov (KAZ)	Astana	230
