= 2011 Tour of Qatar =

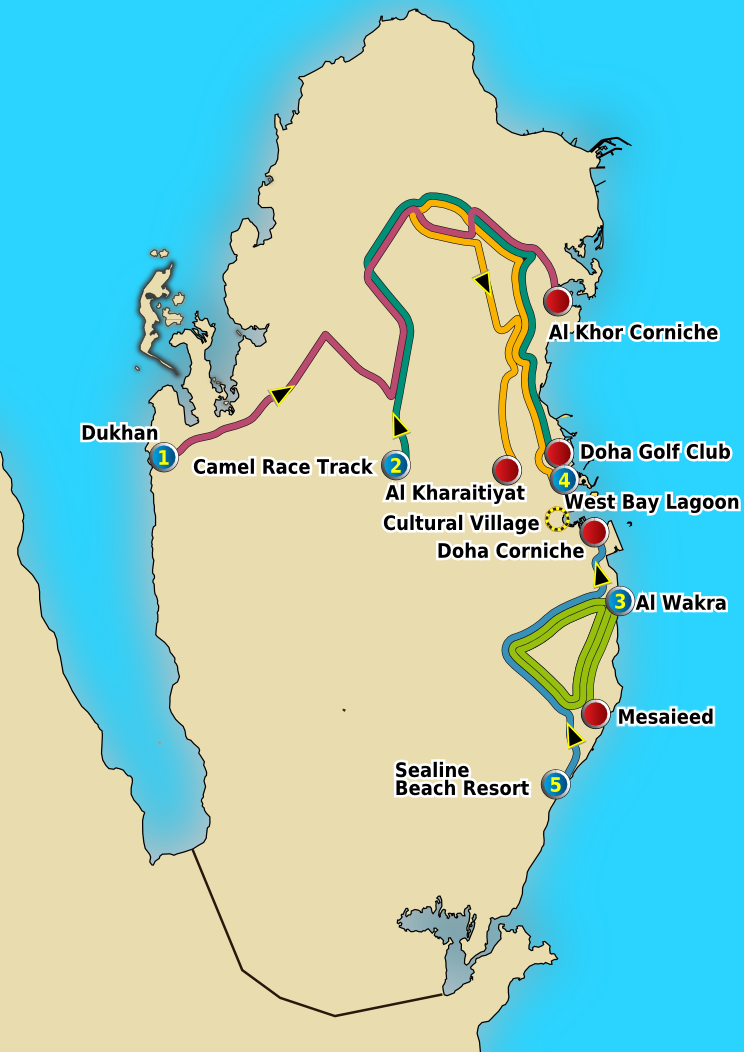

Race details
- Dates: 6–11 February
- Stages: 5 + Prologue
- Distance: 714 km (444 mi)
- Winning time: 15h 31' 04"

Results
Jersey awarded to the overall winner	Winner	Mark Renshaw (AUS)	(HTC–Highroad)
	Second	Heinrich Haussler (AUS)	(Garmin–Cervélo)
	Third	Daniele Bennati (ITA)	(Leopard Trek)
Jersey awarded to the points classification winner	Points	Heinrich Haussler (AUS)	(Garmin–Cervélo)
Jersey awarded to the young rider classification winner	Young rider	Nikolas Maes (BEL)	(Quick-Step)
	Team	Garmin–Cervélo	

The 2011 Tour of Qatar was the tenth edition of the Tour of Qatar cycling stage race. It was rated as a 2.1 event on the UCI Asia Tour, and was held from 6 February to 11 February 2011, in Qatar. The previous race was won by Wouter Mol of Vacansoleil.

== Teams ==
Sixteen teams competed in the 2011 Tour of Qatar. These included ten UCI ProTour teams, five UCI Professional Continental teams, and one Continental team. Each team entered a squad of eight riders, giving the Tour a peloton of 158 riders. The teams participating in the race were:

- Quick-Step
- BMC Racing Team
- Garmin–Cervélo
- HTC–Highroad
- Lampre–ISD
- Leopard Trek
- Skil–Shimano
- Rabobank
- Team Sky
- Topsport Vlaanderen–Mercator
- FDJ
- Astana
- Geox–TMC
- Farnese Vini-Neri Sottoli
- Team Katusha
- An Post–Sean Kelly

== Stages ==
=== Prologue ===
6 February 2011 - Cultural Village, 2.5 km (1.6 mi) (ITT)

Traditionally time trials are ridden on bicycles made specifically for these events. However, being as this was the only time trial in the tour - and a short one - the teams were not allowed to bring time trial bikes and helmets. Lars Boom won the short 2.5 km time trial, edging world champion Fabian Cancellara by 4 seconds.

Prologue Result and General Classification after Prologue

	Rider	Team	Time
1	Lars Boom (NED)	Rabobank	3' 07"
2	Fabian Cancellara (SUI)	Leopard Trek	+ 4"
3	Tom Veelers (NED)	Skil–Shimano	+ 5"
4	Juan Antonio Flecha (ESP)	Team Sky	+ 5"
5	Alex Dowsett (GBR)	Team Sky	+ 6"
6	Gert Steegmans (BEL)	Quick-Step	+ 6"
7	Tom Boonen (BEL)	Quick-Step	+ 6"
8	Maarten Wynants (BEL)	Rabobank	+ 8"
9	Tomas Vaitkus (LTU)	Astana	+ 8"
10	Matt Brammeier (IRL)	HTC–Highroad	+ 9"

=== Stage 1 ===
7 February 2011 - Dukhan to Al Khor Corniche, 145.5 km (90.4 mi)

Stage 1 Results

	Rider	Team	Time
1	Tom Boonen (BEL)	Quick-Step	2h 59' 29"
2	Heinrich Haussler (AUS)	Garmin–Cervélo	st.
3	Mark Renshaw (AUS)	HTC–Highroad	st.
4	Daniele Bennati (ITA)	Leopard Trek	st.
5	Graeme Brown (AUS)	Rabobank	st.
6	Juan Antonio Flecha (ESP)	Team Sky	st.
7	Dominique Rollin (CAN)	FDJ	st.
8	Roger Hammond (GBR)	Garmin–Cervélo	st.
9	Andreas Klier (GER)	Garmin–Cervélo	st.
10	Stuart O'Grady (AUS)	Leopard Trek	st.

General Classification after Stage 1

	Cyclist	Team	Time
1	Tom Boonen (BEL)	Quick-Step	3h 02′ 32″
2	Mark Renshaw (AUS)	HTC–Highroad	+ 4"
3	Fabian Cancellara (SUI)	Leopard Trek	+ 8"
4	Juan Antonio Flecha (ESP)	Team Sky	+ 9"
5	Heinrich Haussler (AUS)	Garmin–Cervélo	+ 11"
6	Daniele Bennati (ITA)	Leopard Trek	+ 16″
7	Andreas Klier (GER)	Garmin–Cervélo	+ 16″
8	Gert Steegmans (BEL)	Quick-Step	+ 17"
9	Jeremy Hunt (GBR)	Team Sky	+ 19"
10	Dominique Rollin (CAN)	FDJ	+ 19"

=== Stage 2 ===
8 February 2011 - Camel Race Track to Doha Golf Club, 135.5 km (84.2 mi)

Stage 2 Results

	Rider	Team	Time
1	Heinrich Haussler (AUS)	Garmin–Cervélo	3h 04' 03"
2	Daniele Bennati (ITA)	Leopard Trek	st.
3	Denis Galimzyanov (RUS)	Team Katusha	st.
4	Theo Bos (NED)	Rabobank	st.
5	Roger Kluge (GER)	Skil–Shimano	st.
6	Tom Boonen (BEL)	Quick-Step	st.
7	Mirco Lorenzetto (ITA)	Astana	st.
8	Danilo Hondo (GER)	Lampre–ISD	st.
9	Gert Steegmans (BEL)	Quick-Step	st.
10	Wouter Weylandt (BEL)	Leopard Trek	st.

General Classification after Stage 2

	Cyclist	Team	Time
1	Tom Boonen (BEL)	Quick-Step	6h 06′ 35″
2	Heinrich Haussler (AUS)	Garmin–Cervélo	+ 1"
3	Mark Renshaw (AUS)	HTC–Highroad	+ 4"
4	Fabian Cancellara (SUI)	Leopard Trek	+ 8"
5	Juan Antonio Flecha (ESP)	Team Sky	+ 9"
6	Daniele Bennati (ITA)	Leopard Trek	+ 10″
7	Andreas Klier (GER)	Garmin–Cervélo	+ 16″
8	Gert Steegmans (BEL)	Quick-Step	+ 17"
9	Jeremy Hunt (GBR)	Team Sky	+ 19"
10	Dominique Rollin (CAN)	FDJ	+ 19"

=== Stage 3 ===
9 February 2011 - Al Wakra to Mesaieed, 150.5 km (93.5 mi)

Stage 3 Results

	Rider	Team	Time
1	Heinrich Haussler (AUS)	Garmin–Cervélo	3h 28' 04"
2	Mark Renshaw (AUS)	HTC–Highroad	st.
3	Daniele Bennati (ITA)	Leopard Trek	st.
4	Dominique Rollin (CAN)	FDJ	st.
5	Lars Boom (NED)	Rabobank	st.
6	Danilo Hondo (GER)	Lampre–ISD	st.
7	Roger Hammond (GBR)	Garmin–Cervélo	st.
8	Juan Antonio Flecha (ESP)	Team Sky	st.
9	Gert Steegmans (BEL)	Quick-Step	st.
10	Denis Galimzyanov (RUS)	Team Katusha	st.

General Classification after Stage 3

	Cyclist	Team	Time
1	Heinrich Haussler (AUS)	Garmin–Cervélo	9h 34′ 30″
2	Mark Renshaw (AUS)	HTC–Highroad	+ 4"
3	Daniele Bennati (ITA)	Leopard Trek	+ 15″
4	Juan Antonio Flecha (ESP)	Team Sky	+ 18"
5	Jeremy Hunt (GBR)	Team Sky	+ 28"
6	Dominique Rollin (CAN)	FDJ	+ 28"
7	Roger Hammond (GBR)	Garmin–Cervélo	+ 30"
8	Gabriel Rasch (NOR)	Garmin–Cervélo	+ 30"
9	Marcus Burghardt (GER)	BMC Racing Team	+ 42"
10	Gert Steegmans (BEL)	Quick-Step	+ 45"

=== Stage 4 ===
10 February 2011 - West Bay Lagoon to Al Kharaitiyat, 153.5 km (95.4 mi)

Stage 4 Results

	Rider	Team	Time
1	Mark Renshaw (AUS)	HTC–Highroad	3h 12' 36"
2	Daniele Bennati (ITA)	Leopard Trek	st.
3	Tom Boonen (BEL)	Quick-Step	st.
4	Heinrich Haussler (AUS)	Garmin–Cervélo	st.
5	Denis Galimzyanov (RUS)	Team Katusha	st.
6	Roger Kluge (GER)	Skil–Shimano	st.
7	Juan Antonio Flecha (ESP)	Team Sky	st.
8	Tomas Vaitkus (LTU)	Astana	st.
9	Roger Hammond (GBR)	Garmin–Cervélo	st.
10	Greg Van Avermaet (BEL)	BMC Racing Team	st.

General Classification after Stage 4

	Cyclist	Team	Time
1	Mark Renshaw (AUS)	HTC–Highroad	12h 47′ 00″
2	Heinrich Haussler (AUS)	Garmin–Cervélo	+ 6"
3	Daniele Bennati (ITA)	Leopard Trek	+ 15″
4	Juan Antonio Flecha (ESP)	Team Sky	+ 18"
5	Roger Hammond (GBR)	Garmin–Cervélo	+ 36"
6	Jeremy Hunt (GBR)	Team Sky	+ 37"
7	Bernhard Eisel (AUT)	HTC–Highroad	+ 1' 03"
8	Gabriel Rasch (NOR)	Garmin–Cervélo	+ 1' 23"
9	Marcus Burghardt (GER)	BMC Racing Team	+ 1' 31"
10	Gert Steegmans (BEL)	Quick-Step	+ 1' 33"

=== Stage 5 ===
11 February 2011 - Sealine Beach Resort to Doha Corniche, 126.5 km (78.6 mi)

Stage 5 Results

	Rider	Team	Time
1	Andrea Guardini (ITA)	Farnese Vini–Neri Sottoli	2h 44' 06"
2	Francesco Chicchi (ITA)	Quick-Step	st.
3	Theo Bos (NED)	Rabobank	st.
4	Dominique Rollin (CAN)	FDJ	st.
5	Roger Kluge (GER)	Skil–Shimano	st.
6	Denis Galimzyanov (RUS)	Team Katusha	st.
7	Tomas Vaitkus (LTU)	Astana	st.
8	Russell Downing (GBR)	Team Sky	st.
9	Heinrich Haussler (AUS)	Garmin–Cervélo	st.
10	Michael Van Staeyen (BEL)	Topsport Vlaanderen–Mercator	st.

General Classification after Stage 5

	Cyclist	Team	Time
1	Mark Renshaw (AUS)	HTC–Highroad	15h 31′ 04″
2	Heinrich Haussler (AUS)	Garmin–Cervélo	+ 8"
3	Daniele Bennati (ITA)	Leopard Trek	+ 17″
4	Juan Antonio Flecha (ESP)	Team Sky	+ 26"
5	Roger Hammond (GBR)	Garmin–Cervélo	+ 38"
6	Jeremy Hunt (GBR)	Team Sky	+ 39"
7	Gabriel Rasch (NOR)	Garmin–Cervélo	+ 42"
8	Bernhard Eisel (AUT)	HTC–Highroad	+ 1' 05"
9	Marcus Burghardt (GER)	BMC Racing Team	+ 1' 33"
10	Gert Steegmans (BEL)	Quick-Step	+ 1' 35"

== Classification leadership ==
In the 2011 Tour of Qatar, three different jerseys are awarded. For the general classification, calculated by adding each cyclist's finishing times on each stage, and allowing time bonuses for the first three finishers on each stage and in intermediate sprints, the leader receives a golden jersey. This classification is considered the most important of the Tour of Qatar, and the winner is considered the winner of the Tour.

Additionally, there is a points classification, which awards a silver jersey. In the points classification, cyclists get points for finishing in the top three in an intermediate sprint or the top twenty of a stage. The first in an intermediate sprint gets 3 points, second 2, and third a single point. The stage win affords 30 points, second is worth 27 points, 25 for third, 23 for fourth, 21 for fifth, 19 for sixth, 17 for seventh, 15 for eighth, 13 for ninth, 11 for tenth, and one point less per place down the line, to a single point for twentieth.

There is also a youth classification, which awards a blue jersey. This classification is calculated the same as the general classification, but only riders born on or after January 1, 1986, are eligible.

The race also awards a teams classification, which is not represented by a jersey. The teams classification is calculated by adding the times of each team's best three riders per stage per day.

Stage	Winner	General Classification	Points Classification	Young Rider Classification	Teams Classification
P	Lars Boom	Lars Boom	Lars Boom	Alex Dowsett	Rabobank
1	Tom Boonen	Tom Boonen	Tom Boonen	Nikolas Maes	Leopard Trek
2	Heinrich Haussler	Tom Boonen	Heinrich Haussler	Nikolas Maes	Leopard Trek
3	Heinrich Haussler	Heinrich Haussler	Heinrich Haussler	Nikolas Maes	Garmin–Cervélo
4	Mark Renshaw	Mark Renshaw	Heinrich Haussler	Nikolas Maes	Garmin–Cervélo
5	Andrea Guardini	Mark Renshaw	Heinrich Haussler	Nikolas Maes	Garmin–Cervélo
Final		Mark Renshaw	Heinrich Haussler	Nikolas Maes	Garmin–Cervélo

== Final standings ==
=== General classification ===
	Rider	Team	Time
1	Mark Renshaw (AUS)	HTC–Highroad	15h 31′ 04″
2	Heinrich Haussler (AUS)	Garmin–Cervélo	+ 8"
3	Daniele Bennati (ITA)	Leopard Trek	+ 17″
4	Juan Antonio Flecha (ESP)	Team Sky	+ 26"
5	Roger Hammond (GBR)	Garmin–Cervélo	+ 38"
6	Jeremy Hunt (GBR)	Team Sky	+ 39"
7	Gabriel Rasch (NOR)	Garmin–Cervélo	+ 42"
8	Bernhard Eisel (AUT)	HTC–Highroad	+ 1' 05"
9	Marcus Burghardt (GER)	BMC Racing Team	+ 1' 33"
10	Gert Steegmans (BEL)	Quick-Step	+ 1' 35"

=== Points classification ===
	Rider	Team	Points
1	Heinrich Haussler (AUS)	Garmin–Cervélo	52
2	Mark Renshaw (AUS)	HTC–Highroad	46
3	Daniele Bennati (ITA)	Leopard Trek	41
4	Tom Boonen (BEL)	Quick-Step	33
5	Lars Boom (NED)	Rabobank	23
6	Denis Galimzyanov (RUS)	Team Katusha	21
7	Juan Antonio Flecha (ESP)	Team Sky	19
8	Dominique Rollin (CAN)	FDJ	18
9	Roger Kluge (GER)	Skil–Shimano	17
10	Theo Bos (NED)	Rabobank	16

== See also ==
- 2011 in men's road cycling
- 2011 in Qatar
