= Tim, Denmark =

Tim
- Village
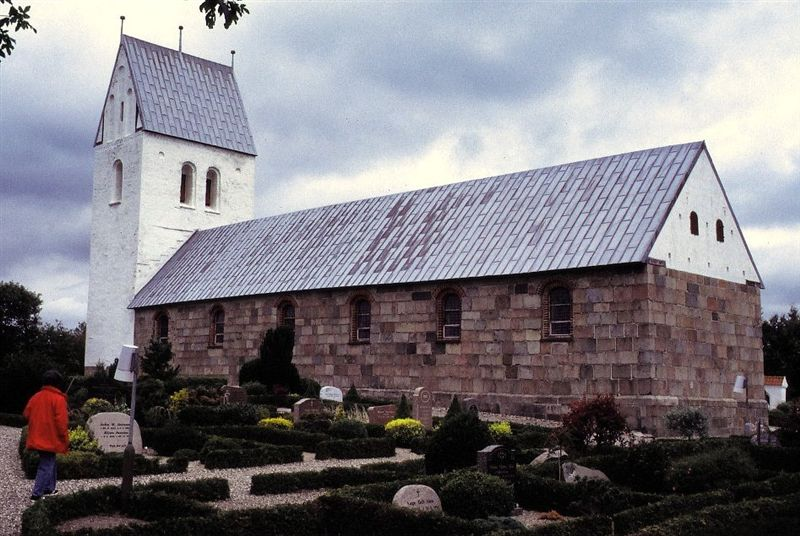
- Tim Church in Tim Kirkeby

- Location in Central Denmark Region Tim (Denmark)
- Coordinates: 56°11′47″N 8°18′22″E
- Country: Denmark
- Region: Central Denmark (Midtjylland)
- Municipality: Ringkøbing-Skjern

Population (2026)
  - Total: 874
- Time zone: UTC+1 (CET)
  - Summer (DST): UTC+2 (CEST)

Tim is a village situated in the Ringkøbing-Skjern Municipality, in the Central Denmark Region. The village is served by Tim railway station on the Esbjerg-Struer railway line.

Tim Church is located in the small village of Tim Kirkeby west of Tim.

== Location and transport ==
Tim is located between Ringkøbing and Ulfborg, approximately 11 km (7 mi) from the North Sea coast. Primærrute 16, a major road in Denmark, runs along the western edge of the town. Tim is served by Tim railway station, which is located on the Esbjerg–Struer railway line between Esbjerg and Struer.
