= 2015 Clásica de Almería =

2015 UCI Europe Tour

Race details
- Dates: 15 February 2015
- Stages: 1
- Distance: 185.9 km (115.5 mi)
- Winning time: 4h 36' 19"

Results
	Winner	Mark Cavendish (GBR)	(Etixx–Quick-Step)
	Second	Juan José Lobato (ESP)	(Movistar Team)
	Third	Mark Renshaw (AUS)	(Etixx–Quick-Step)

The 2015 Clásica de Almería was the 30th edition of the Clásica de Almería cycle race and was held on 15 February 2015. The race started and finished in Almería. The race was won by Mark Cavendish.

== Teams ==
Twenty teams competed in the 2015 Clásica de Almería. These included eight UCI WorldTeams, ten UCI Professional Continental and two UCI Continental teams.

The teams that participated in the race were:

- AG2R La Mondiale
- Androni Giocattoli
- Astana
- Bora–Argon 18
- Burgos BH
- Caja Rural–Seguros RGA
- CCC–Sprandi–Polkowice
- Cofidis
- Etixx–Quick-Step
- Team Europcar
- FDJ
- IAM Cycling
- Team Katusha
- Movistar Team
- MTN–Qhubeka
- Murias Taldea
- RusVelo
- Topsport Vlaanderen–Baloise
- Trek Factory Racing
- UnitedHealthcare

== Result ==
Final general classification

Rank	Rider	Team	Time
1	Mark Cavendish (GBR)	Etixx–Quick-Step	4h 36' 19"
2	Juan José Lobato (ESP)	Movistar Team	+ 0"
3	Mark Renshaw (AUS)	Etixx–Quick-Step	+ 0"
4	Valerio Agnoli (ITA)	Astana	+ 0"
5	Edward Theuns (BEL)	Topsport Vlaanderen–Baloise	+ 0"
6	Alexander Porsev (RUS)	Team Katusha	+ 0"
7	Lloyd Mondory (FRA)	AG2R La Mondiale	+ 0"
8	Grega Bole (SLO)	CCC–Sprandi–Polkowice	+ 0"
9	Oscar Gatto (ITA)	Androni Giocattoli	+ 0"
10	Rüdiger Selig (GER)	Team Katusha	+ 0"
