= Ulfborg railway station =

Railway station in West Jutland, Denmark

Ulfborg
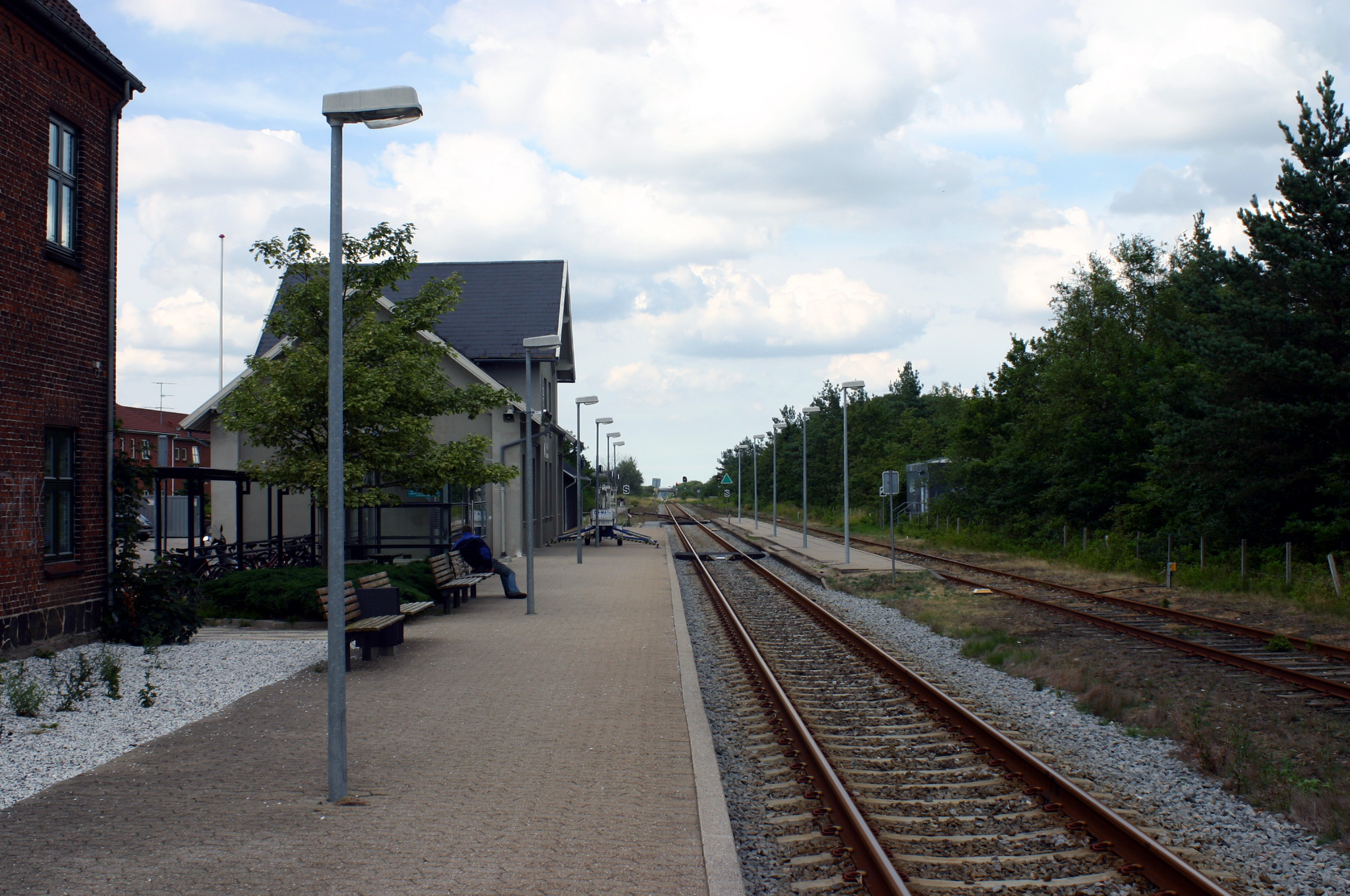
- Ulfborg station in 2005

General information
- Location: Bredgade 11; 6990 Ulfborg; Holstebro Municipality; Denmark
- Coordinates: 56°16′18″N 8°19′30.5″E
- Elevation: 14.4 metres (47 ft)
- Owner: Banedanmark
- Line: Esbjerg–Struer railway line
- Platforms: 2
- Tracks: 2
- Train operators: Midtjyske Jernbaner

History
- Opened: 31 March 1875

Services
Preceding station	Midtjyske Jernbaner	Following station
Tim towards Skjern	Skjern–Holstebro Regional train	Vemb towards Holstebro
Location

Ulfborg railway station is a railway station serving the small railway town of Ulfborg in West Jutland, Denmark.

Ulfborg station is located on the Esbjerg–Struer railway line from Esbjerg to Struer. The station opened in 1875. It offers regional rail services to Holstebro and Skjern, operated by the railway company Midtjyske Jernbaner.

== History ==
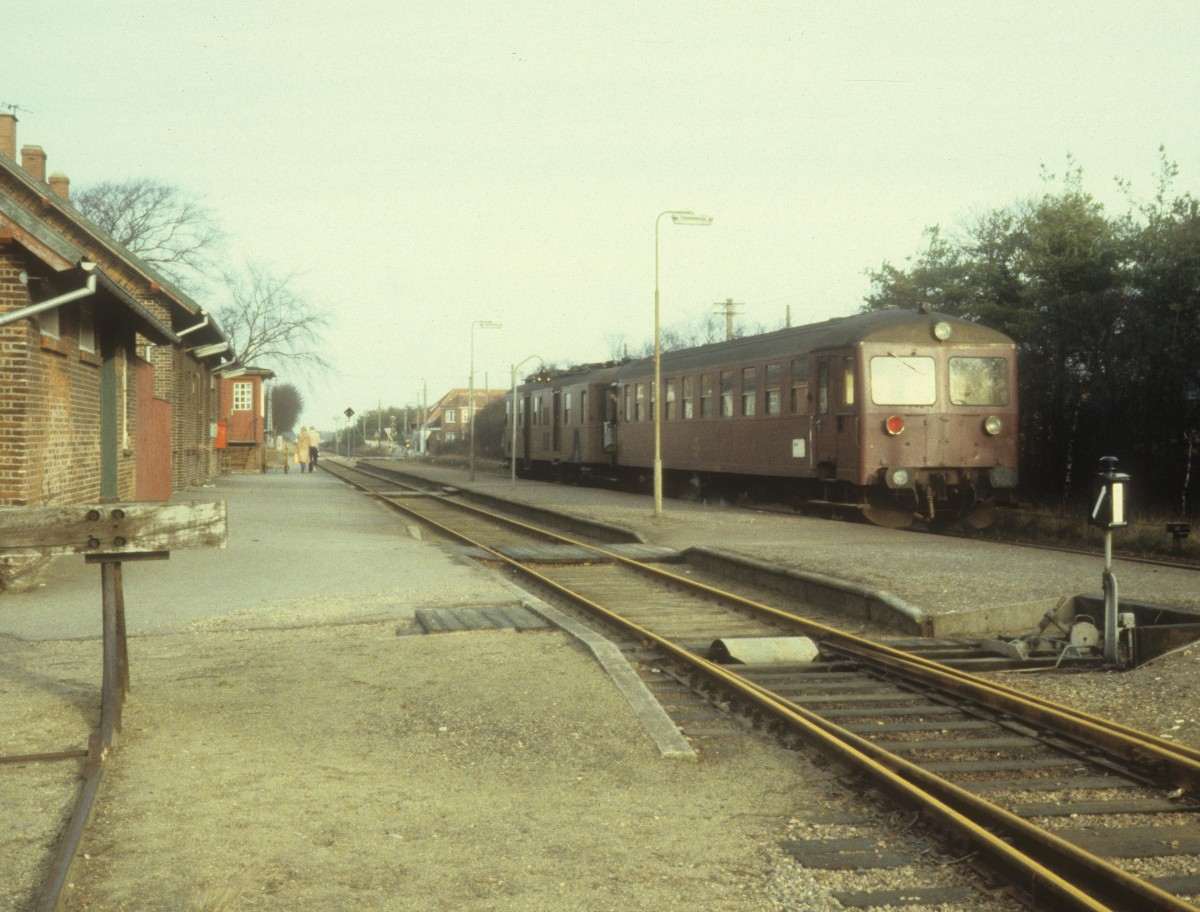
DSB train calling at Ulfborg station in 1981.

The station opened on 31 March 1875 as the section from Holstebro to Ringkøbing of the new Esbjerg–Struer railway line opened. Later the same year, on 8 August, the section from Varde to Ringkøbing also opened, and the West Jutland longitudinal railway line was thus completed.

It has been unstaffed since 1970.

== Architecture ==
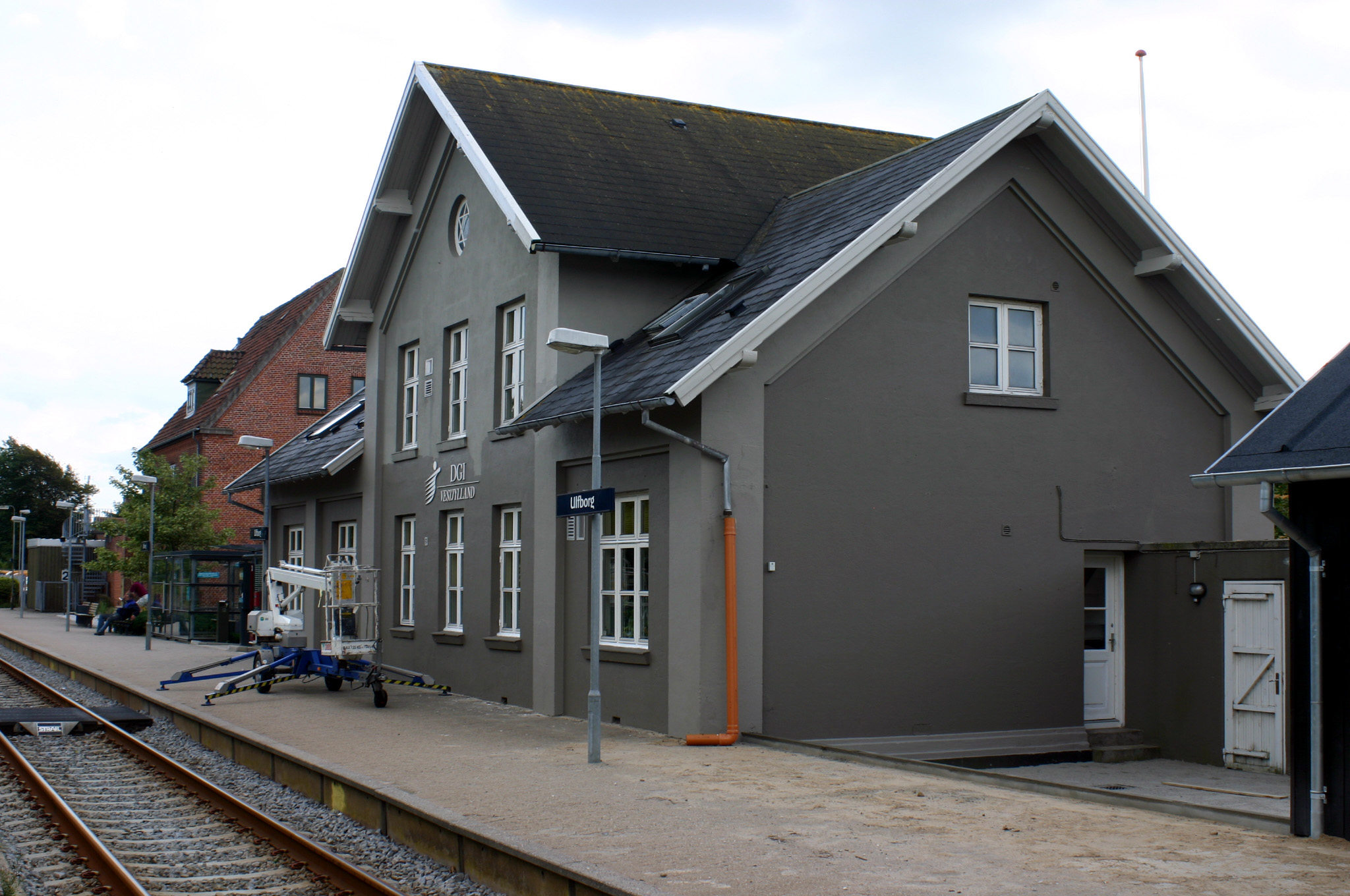
Platform facade of Ulfborg station in 2005.

The station building from 1875 was designed by the Danish architect Niels Peder Christian Holsøe (1826–1895), known for the numerous railway stations he designed across Denmark in his capacity of head architect of the Danish State Railways.

== Services ==
The station offers direct regional rail services to Skjern and Holstebro, operated by the regional railway company Midtjyske Jernbaner.

== See also ==
- List of railway stations in Denmark
- Rail transport in Denmark
