= Joost van Leijen =

Dutch former professional road cyclist (born 1984)

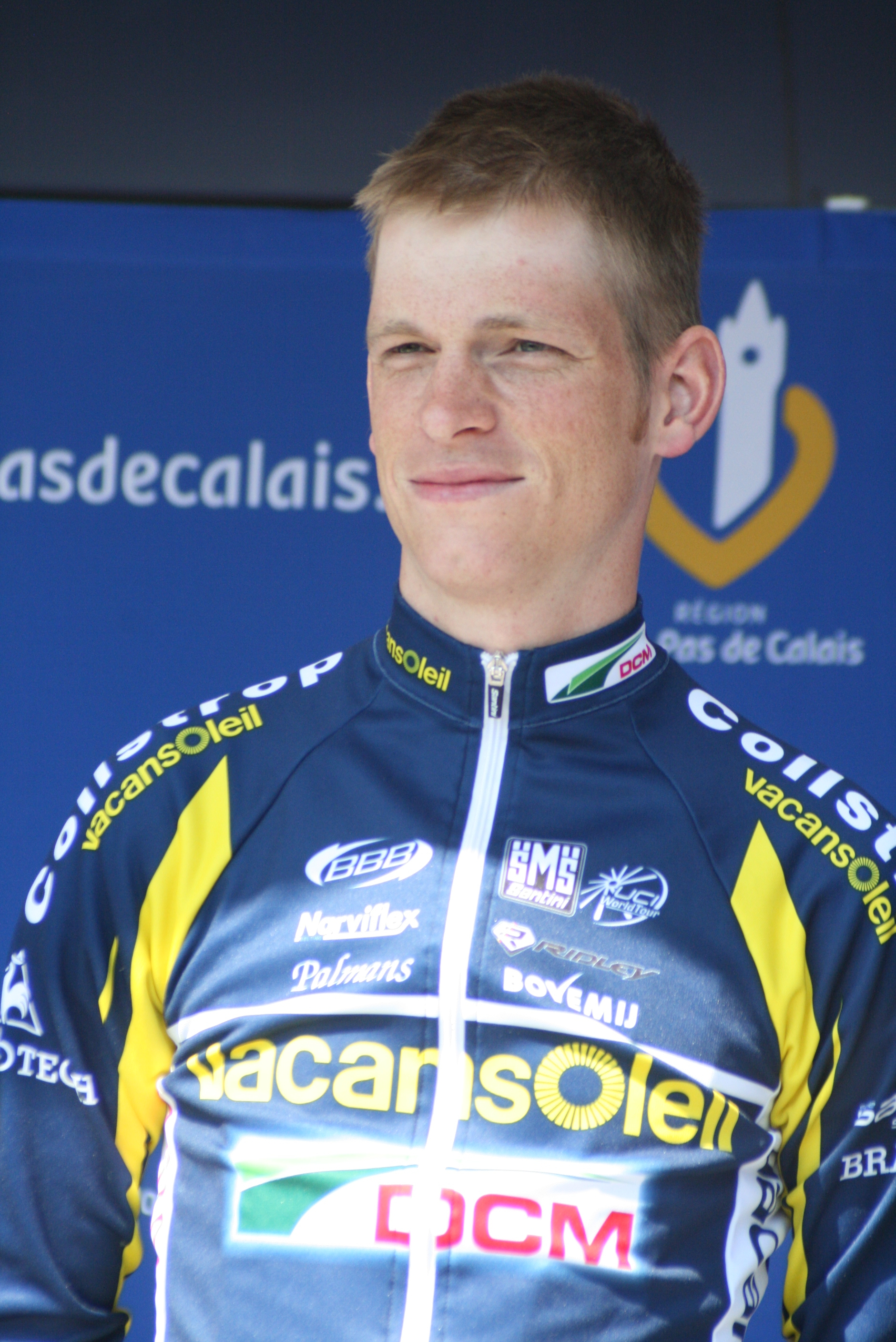
- Van Leijen at the 2011 Four Days of Dunkirk.

Personal information
- Full name: Joost van Leijen
- Born: 20 July 1984 (age 42) Nijmegen, the Netherlands
- Height: 1.92 m (6 ft 3 1/2 in)
- Weight: 73 kg (161 lb)

Cycling career
- Sport: Cycling
- Discipline: Road
- Role: Rider

Amateur teams
- 2003–2009: Van Vliet–EBH Advocaten–Gazelle
- 2009: Vacansoleil (stagiaire)

Professional teams
- 2010–2011: Vacansoleil
- 2012–2013: Lotto–Belisol

Joost van Leijen (born 20 July 1984) is a Dutch former professional road cyclist, who competed as a professional between 2010 and 2013.

== Palmarès ==
2005
5th GP Herning
2007
1st Overall Tour de Slovaquie

1st Stage 3

2008
2nd Overall Tour de Hokkaido

1st Stage 4

5th Grote Prijs Jef Scherens
2009
2nd Overall Olympia's Tour
2nd Ringerike GP
2010
1st Münsterland Giro
3rd GP Herning
8th Ronde van Noord-Holland
10th Overall Danmark Rundt
2011
2nd Overall Tour de Wallonie

1st Stage 2

4th Overall Ster ZLM Toer
6th Overall Eneco Tour
8th Overall Tour of Belgium
