= Classica Corsica =

French one-day road cycling race

Race details
- Date: March
- Region: Corsica, France
- English name: Corsica Classic
- Discipline: Road race
- Competition: UCI Europe Tour
- Type: Single-day race
- Organiser: Corsican Regional Authority
- Race director: Dominique Bozzi
- Web site: www.corse.fr/classicacorsica/

History
- First edition: 2015
- Editions: 1
- Final edition: 2015
- First winner: Thomas Boudat (FRA)
- Most wins: No repeat winners
- Final winner: Thomas Boudat (FRA)

Classica Corsica was an elite men's road bicycle racing event held in 2015 on the island of Corsica, a region of France. It was run two days before the Critérium International stage race, which had been held on Corsica every year since 2010. The Classica itself was a legacy event of the 2013 Tour de France, when the race held its Grand Départ and first three stages on the island. The event was UCI 1.1 rated and was part of the 2015 UCI Europe Tour. The route of the race saw the riders depart Ajaccio and finish in Bastia after 204 kilometres (127 miles) taking in the Col de Vizzavona and the Col de Bellagranajo, before flattening out in the second half of the stage, which represented essentially a reverse running of the second stage from the 2013 Tour.

== Winners ==
Year	Country	Rider	Team
2015	France	Thomas Boudat	Team Europcar
