= Philip Nielsen =

Danish cyclist

Personal information
- Full name: Philip Nicolas Nielsen
- Born: 31 August 1987 (age 39)

Cycling career
- Sport: Cycling
- Discipline: Track cycling
- Role: Rider
- Rider type: sprinter

Philip Nicolas Nielsen (born 31 August 1987) is a Danish male track cyclist, riding for the national team. He competed in the 1 km time trial event at the 2010 UCI Track Cycling World Championships.
