= Michael Van Staeyen =

Belgian cyclist

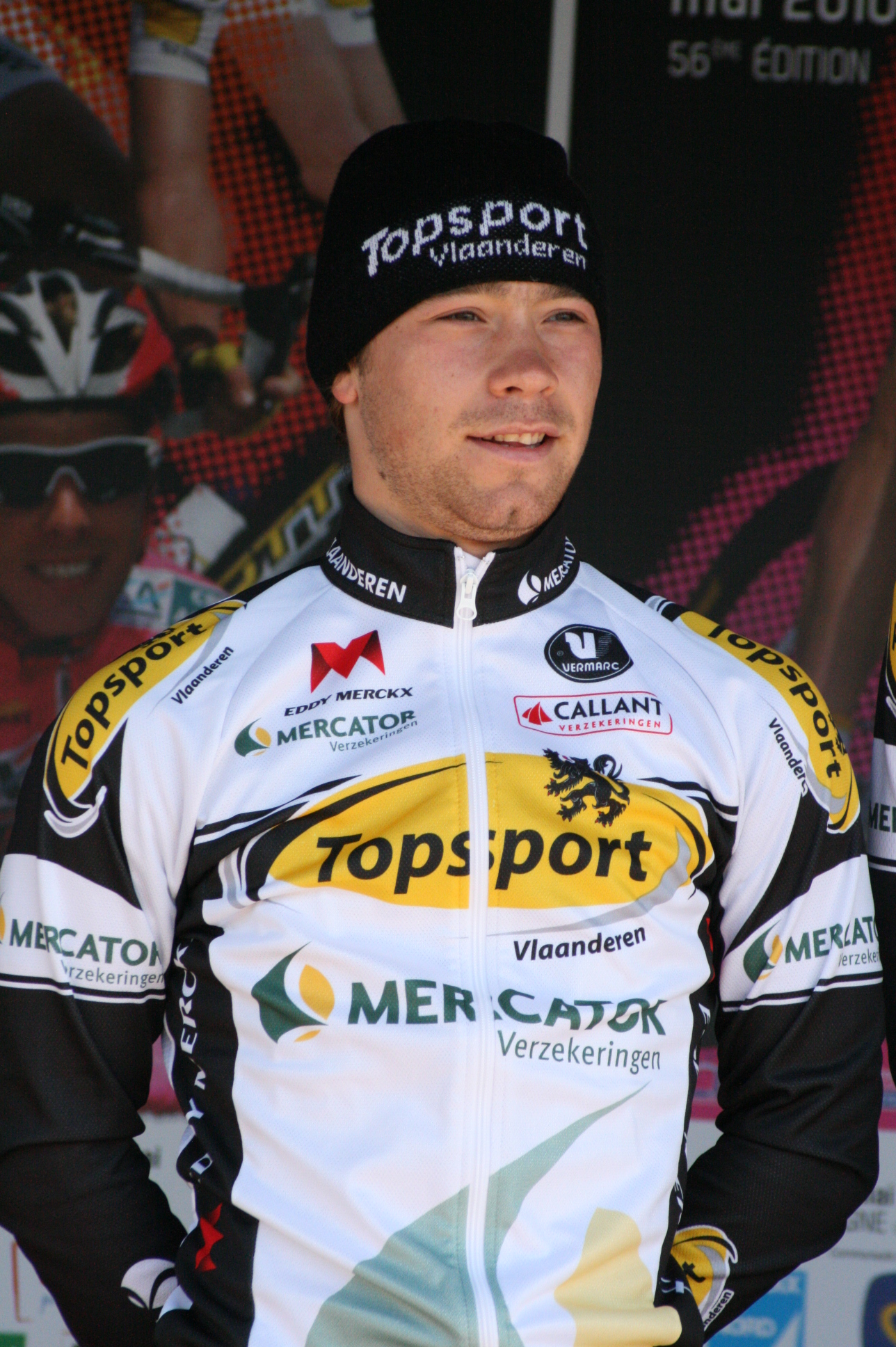
- Van Staeyen at the 2010 Four Days of Dunkirk

Personal information
- Full name: Michael Van Staeyen
- Born: 13 August 1988 (age 38) Ekeren, Belgium
- Height: 167 cm (5 ft 6 in)
- Weight: 62 kg (137 lb)

Cycling career
- Sport: Cycling
- Current team: Retired
- Discipline: Road
- Role: Rider
- Rider type: Sprinter

Amateur team
- 2007: Davo

Professional teams
- 2008–2009: Rabobank Continental Team
- 2010–2014: Topsport Vlaanderen–Mercator
- 2015–2018: Cofidis
- 2019: Roompot–Charles
- 2020: Tarteletto–Isorex
- 2021–2022: EvoPro Racing

Michael Van Staeyen (born 13 August 1988 in Ekeren) is a Belgian former professional road racing cyclist, who competed as a professional from 2008 until 2022.

In March 2022, Van Staeyen announced that he would retire from professional cycling after the following month's Scheldeprijs.

== Major results ==
2008
2nd Antwerpse Havenpijl
3rd Omloop der Kempen
4th Ronde van Overijssel
5th Münsterland Giro
2009
1st Stage 4 Istrian Spring Trophy
1st Stage 3 Vuelta Ciclista a León
3rd Ronde van Noord-Holland
4th Arno Wallaard Memorial
4th Omloop der Kempen
4th Antwerpse Havenpijl
8th Schaal Sels
2010
1st Stadsprijs Geraardsbergen
1st Memorial Rik Van Steenbergen
1st Stage 2 Danmark Rundt
5th Overall Tour de Picardie
5th Schaal Sels
7th Omloop van het Houtland
2011
3rd Schaal Sels
3rd Kampioenschap van Vlaanderen
5th Dutch Food Valley Classic
5th Grote Prijs Jef Scherens
8th Memorial Rik Van Steenbergen
9th Omloop van het Waasland
9th Paris–Brussels
9th Grand Prix Impanis-Van Petegem
9th Nationale Sluitingsprijs
10th Grand Prix de Denain
2012
2nd Grote Prijs Stad Geel
2nd Münsterland Giro
2nd Nationale Sluitingsprijs
4th Paris–Brussels
5th Ronde van Limburg
5th Dutch Food Valley Classic
5th Grand Prix Impanis-Van Petegem
5th Omloop van het Houtland
5th De Kustpijl
8th Halle–Ingooigem
9th Overall World Ports Classic
2013
1st Stage 1 Étoile de Bessèges
2nd Schaal Sels
3rd Kampioenschap van Vlaanderen
4th Grand Prix Criquielion
4th Ronde van Zeeland Seaports
4th ProRace Berlin
4th Münsterland Giro
5th Tour de Vendée
5th Paris–Tours
5th Nationale Sluitingsprijs
6th Binche–Chimay–Binche
8th Dutch Food Valley Classic
8th Omloop van het Houtland
9th Omloop van het Waasland
10th Handzame Classic
10th Scheldeprijs
2014
1st De Kustpijl
3rd Ronde van Zeeland Seaports
3rd Halle–Ingooigem
4th Brussels Cycling Classic
4th Kampioenschap van Vlaanderen
5th Omloop van het Waasland
5th Velothon Berlin
5th Ronde van Limburg
9th Binche–Chimay–Binche
2015
5th Brussels Cycling Classic
6th Classica Corsica
8th Scheldeprijs
9th Overall World Ports Classic
2017
8th Ronde van Limburg
8th Tacx Pro Classic
2019
3rd Schaal Sels
4th Omloop Mandel-Leie-Schelde
6th Grote Prijs Marcel Kint
6th Grand Prix Pino Cerami
2020
7th Gooikse Pijl
2021
5th Dorpenomloop Rucphen
