= Ulfborg =

- Town
- Location in Denmark Ulfborg (Central Denmark Region)
- Coordinates: 56°16′19″N 8°19′4″E
- Country: Denmark
- Region: Central Denmark (Midtjylland)
- Municipality: Holstebro Municipality
- Parish: Ulfborg Parish

Area
  - Urban: 1.9 km^{2} (0.73 sq mi)

Population (2026)
  - Urban: 2,032
  - Urban density: 1,100/km^{2} (2,800/sq mi)
- Time zone: UTC+1 (CET)
  - Summer (DST): UTC+2 (CEST)
- Postal code: DK-6990 Ulfborg

Ulfborg is a railway town, with a population of 2,032 (1 January 2026), in Holstebro Municipality, Central Denmark Region in Denmark. It is located 22 km southwest of Holstebro and 21 km north of Ringkøbing and is served by Ulfborg railway station on the Esbjerg–Struer railway line.

Ulfborg was the municipal seat of the former Ulfborg-Vemb Municipality until 1 January 2007.

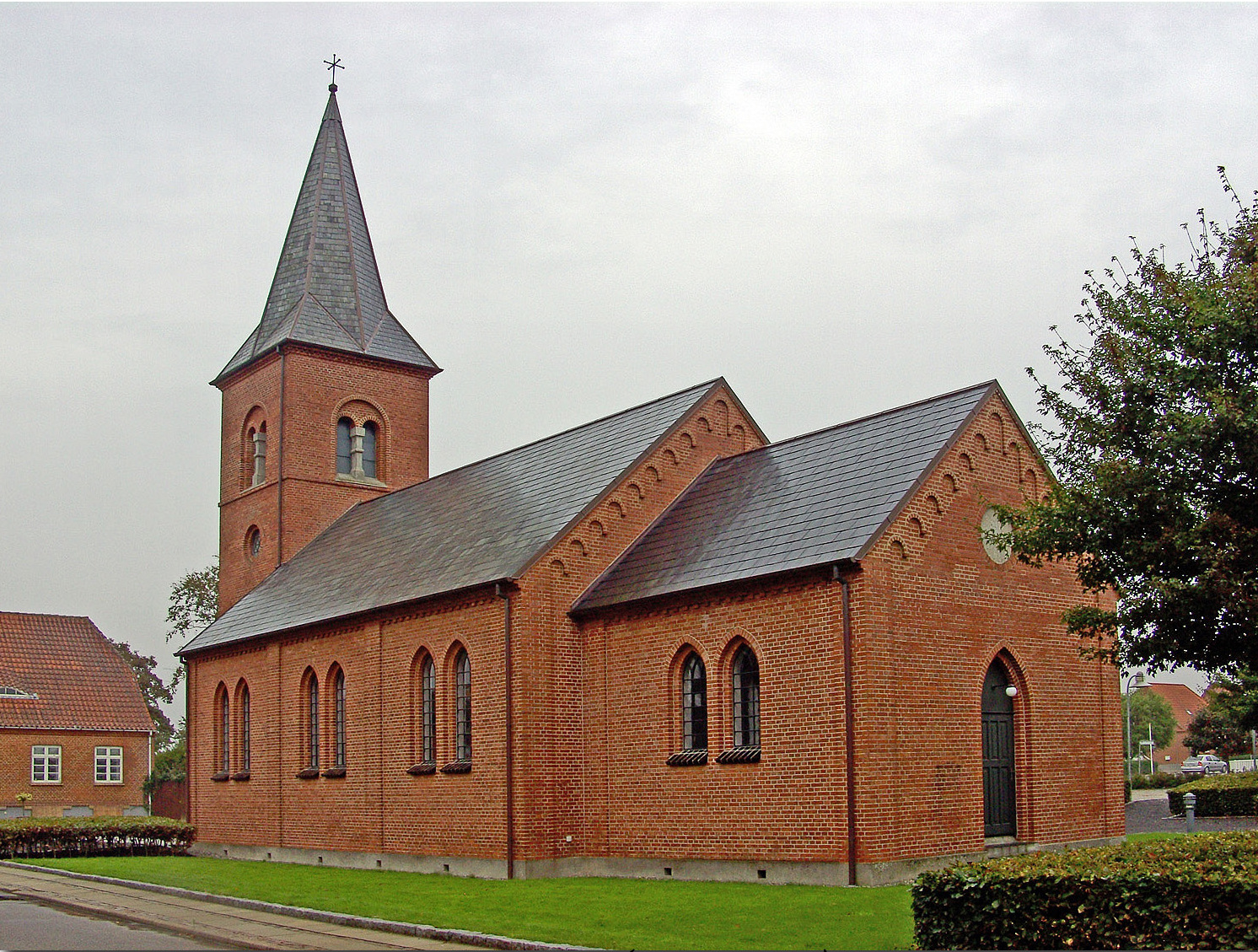
Ulfkær Church

Ulfkær Church, under Ulfborg Parish, is located in the town.

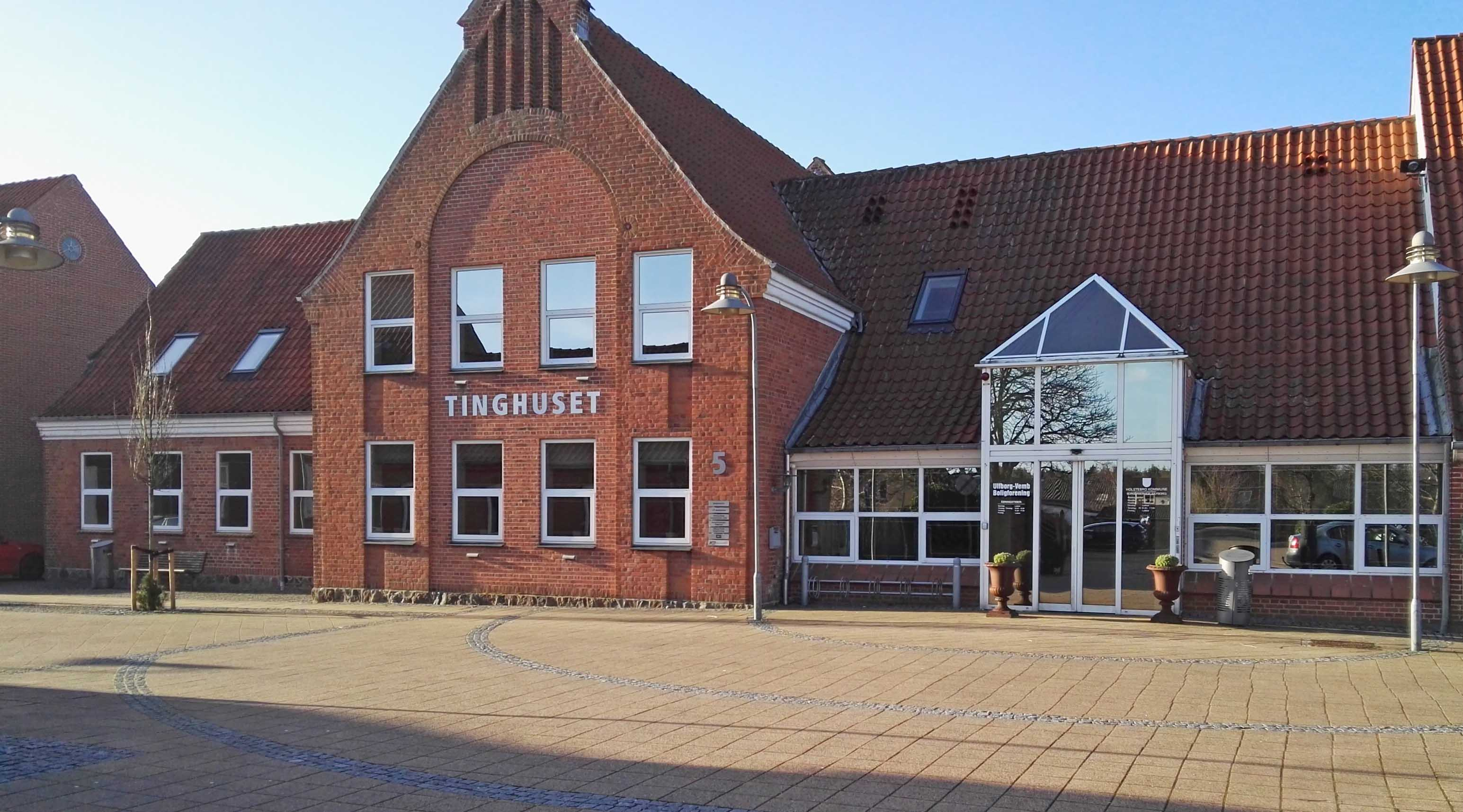
Tinghuset in Ulfborg

Tinghuset - The courthouse in Ulfborg and the former town hall of Ulfborg-Vemb Municipality was designed in 1916-1917 by architect Erik V. Lind as the town's cooperative dairy. Today Tinghuset is a cultural center and houses DGI West Jutland, the municipal Citizens' Service, the Local Police, the administration of the local housing association, the local department of Holstebro Music School and the Local History Archive. Furthermore, the Tinghuset is the setting for a wide range of cultural activities and events.

The Tvind schools, with the distinctive red and white 54 metres tall windturbine Tvindmøllen (The Tvind Mill), are located about 3 km southwest of the town.

== Ulfborg Kirkeby ==
Ulfborg Kirkeby (Ulfborg Church Village) is a small village, located 4 km north of Ulfborg, between Ulfborg and Vemb.

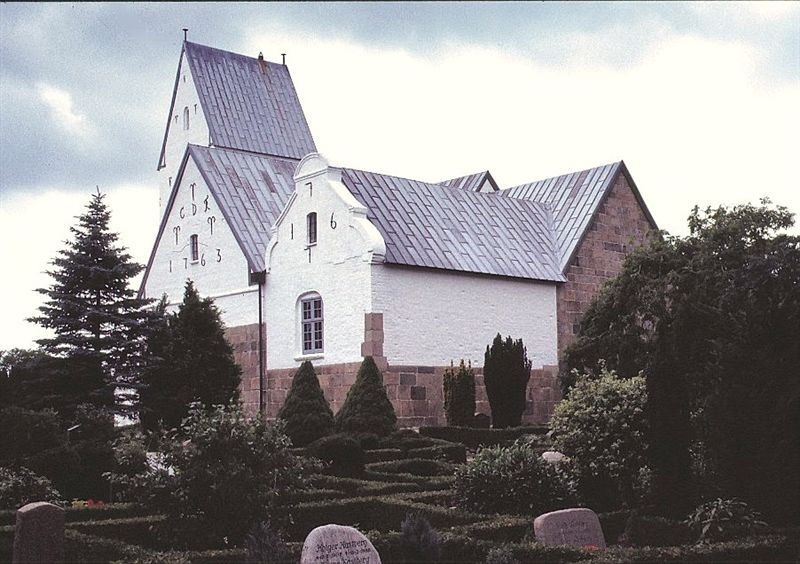
Ulfborg Church

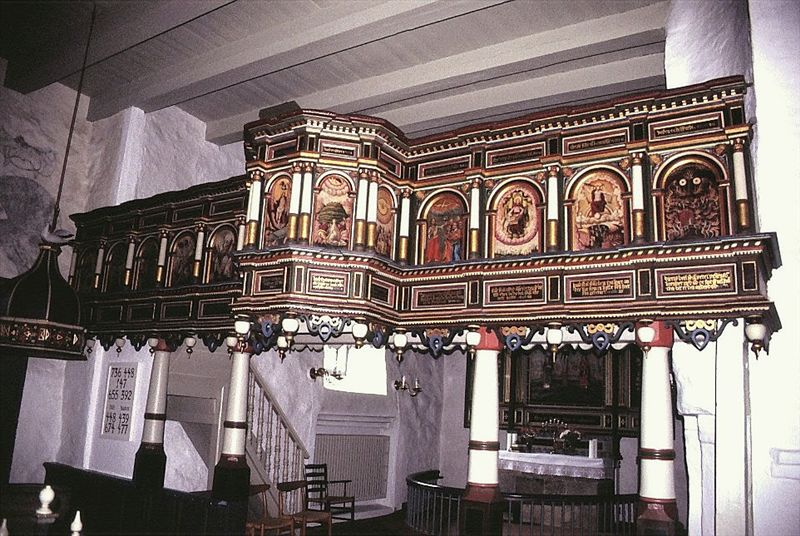
The pulpit

Ulfborg Church, under Ulfborg Parish, built at the end of the 12th century is located in the village. The church is known for its pulpit which reaches all the way across the church room.
