= List of career achievements by Peter Sagan =

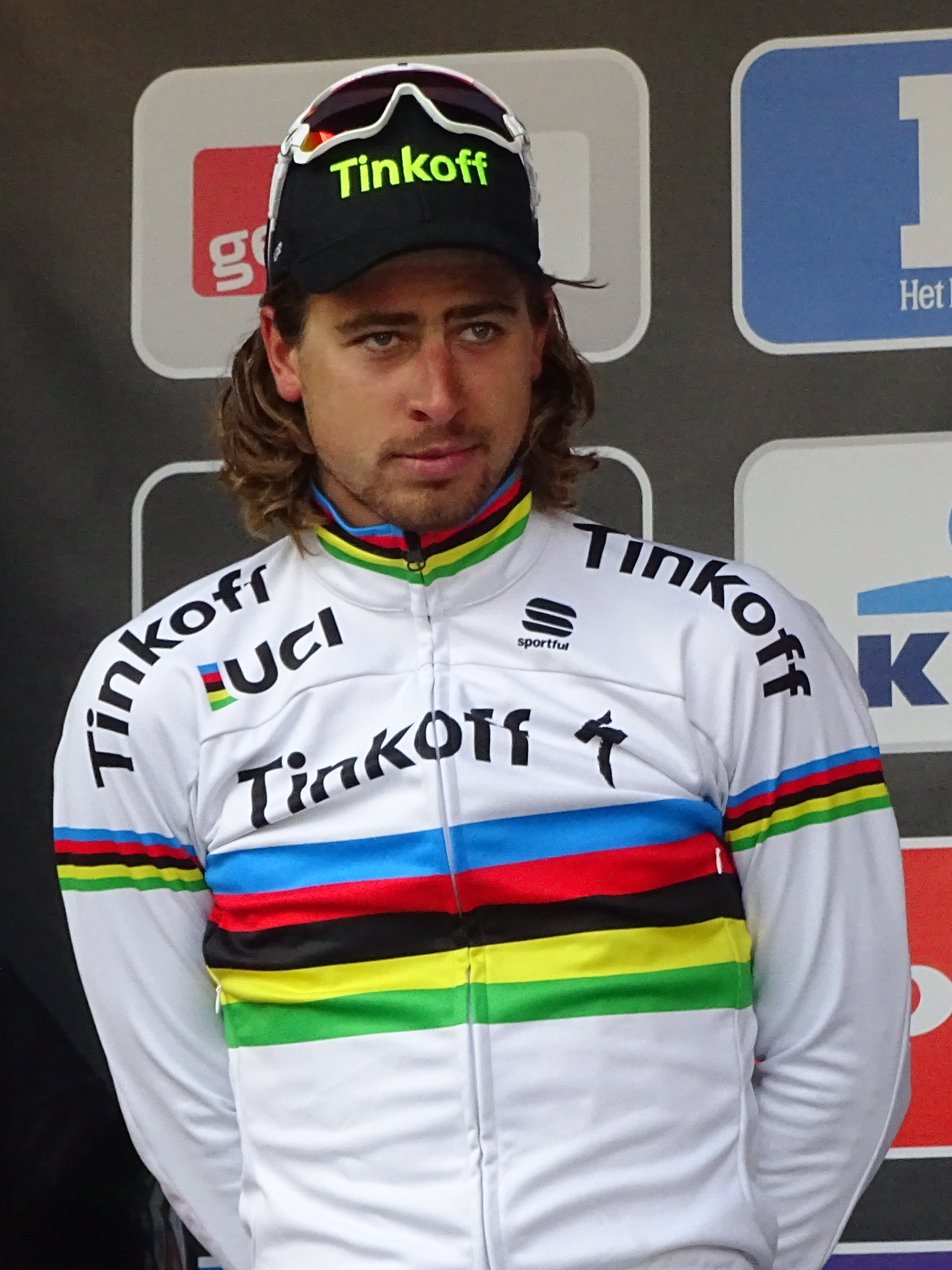
- Sagan at the 2016 Omloop Het Nieuwsblad

Cycling career
- Sport: Cycling

Major wins
- Grand Tours Tour de France Points classification (2012–2016, 2018, 2019) Combativity award (2016) 12 individual stages (2012, 2013, 2016–2019) Giro d'Italia Points classification (2021) 2 individual stages (2020, 2021) Vuelta a España 4 individual stages (2011, 2015) Stage races Tour de Pologne (2011) Tour of California (2015) One-day races and Classics World Road Race Championships (2015, 2016, 2017) European Road Race Championships (2016) National Road Race Championships (2011–2015, 2018, 2021, 2022) National Time Trial Championships (2015) Tour of Flanders (2016) Paris–Roubaix (2018) Gent–Wevelgem (2013, 2016, 2018) E3 Harelbeke (2014) GP de Montréal (2013) GP de Québec (2016, 2017) Kuurne–Brussels–Kuurne (2017) Brabantse Pijl (2013) Other UCI World Tour (2016) UCI World Ranking (2016) Vélo d'Or (2016)
Medal record
Representing Slovakia
Men's road bicycle racing
World Championships
Gold medal – first place	2017 Bergen	Elite road race
Gold medal – first place	2016 Doha	Elite road race
Gold medal – first place	2015 Richmond	Elite road race
European Championships
Gold medal – first place	2016 Plumelec	Elite road race
Men's mountain bike racing
World Championships
Gold medal – first place	2008 Val di Sole	Junior cross-country
European Championships
Gold medal – first place	2008 Sankt Wendel	Junior cross-country
Bronze medal – third place	2007 Cappadocia	Junior cross-country
Men's cyclo-cross
World Championships
Silver medal – second place	2008 Treviso	Junior
European Championships
Bronze medal – third place	2007 Hittnau	Junior

This is a list of career achievements by Peter Sagan, a Slovak professional racing cyclist for UCI ProTeam, Team TotalEnergies. Originally a cyclo-cross and mountain bike racing competitor as a junior, Sagan has also competed on the road as a professional since 2009. Sagan is a noted cycling sprinter and Classics specialist, and as such is a prolific winner of individual stages in stage races as well as winning World and European titles. Sagan has eighteen Grand Tour stage victories, and is a seven-time winner of the points classification in the Tour de France, an all time record.

== Career highlights ==
2010

- Sagan wins his first World Tour stage at the 2010 Paris–Nice, on the third stage. He won another stage later in the race, as well as the points classification.

2011

- Sagan wins his first Grand Tour stages, winning three during the Vuelta a España.

2012

- After a fourth successive stage win in the 2012 Tour of California, Sagan establishes a record number of stage wins at the race, with seven.
- Sagan wins the opening road stage of the 2012 Tour de France, his first Tour, aged 22 years, 157 days. As a result, Sagan became the youngest rider to win a Tour stage since Lance Armstrong in the 1993 Tour de France.
- Sagan becomes the ninth rider to win the points classification in the Tour de France in his first appearance in the race.

2013

- Sagan wins a total of 22 races, the most for any professional rider in 2013.

2015

- Sagan becomes the first Slovak rider to win the World Road Race Championships, soloing to victory in Richmond, Virginia.

2016

- Sagan becomes the first Slovak rider to win a Monument classic, winning the 2016 Tour of Flanders. In the process, he assumes the number one position in the UCI World Ranking.
- Sagan surpasses Hugo Koblet and Ferdinand Kübler for most stage wins at the Tour de Suisse, with his twelfth victory coming on the second stage of the 2016 Tour de Suisse.
- Sagan becomes the second rider to win the points classification in the Tour de France five times.
- After the event is opened to elite riders for the first time, Sagan becomes the inaugural winner of the men's road race at the 2016 European Road Championships.
- Sagan tops the individual rankings for the 2016 UCI World Tour, doing so for the first time.
- Sagan retains the World Road Race Championships in Qatar, becoming the first rider to retain the world title since Paolo Bettini in 2006 and 2007.

2017

- Sagan takes 100th professional career win at Grand Prix Cycliste de Québec.
- Sagan becomes the first rider to win the elite men World Championship road race three years in a row and also the first one to win three titles on three different continents, by winning the road race in Bergen. He also becomes the fifth and the youngest rider to win three career titles.

2018

- Sagan wins his second Monument by winning the 2018 Paris–Roubaix after attacking from the peloton 54 km from the finish.
- After stage 15 in the 2018 Tour de France Sagan received his 100th green jersey.
- Sagan becomes the second rider to win points classification in the Tour de France six times.

2019

- Sagan becomes the first rider to win points classification in the Tour de France seven times.

2020

- Sagan becomes the 100th rider to win stages in all three Grand Tours.

2021

- Sagan wins the points classification in the Giro d'Italia, his first points classification in a Grand Tour other than the Tour de France.

== Major results ==
=== Cyclo-cross ===
2006–2007
1st National Junior Championships
Junior Gazet van Antwerpen

2nd Loenhout

3rd Junior Witloofveldrit
2007–2008
1st National Junior Championships
Junior Superprestige

1st Diegem

2nd UCI World Junior Championships
3rd UEC European Junior Championships
UCI Junior World Cup

3rd Hofstade

=== Mountain bike ===
2007
3rd Cross-country, UEC European Junior Championships
2008
1st Cross-country, UCI World Junior Championships
1st Cross-country, UEC European Junior Championships
2009
2nd Dohnany

=== Road ===
2006
3rd Road race, National Junior Championships
2007
1st Road race, National Junior Championships
1st Mountains classification, Internationale Junioren-Rundfahrt Niedersachsen
2nd Overall La Coupe du Président de la Ville de Grudziądz
4th Road race, UCI World Junior Championships
4th Overall Internationale 3-Etappen-Rundfahrt

1st Stage 1

6th Overall Trofeo Karlsberg

1st Stage 4

8th Road race, UEC European Junior Championships
2008
National Junior Championships

1st Road race
2nd Time trial

1st Overall Po Stajerski

1st Points classification
1st Mountains classification
1st Stage 1 & 2

1st Overall Tour d'Istrie
1st Stage 3b Trofeo Karlsberg
1st Stage 4 Giro della Lunigiana
2nd Overall Course de la Paix Juniors

1st Stage 4

2nd Paris–Roubaix Juniors
8th Road race, UEC European Junior Championships
2009
1st Grand Prix Kooperativa
2nd Overall The Paths of King Nikola
3rd Grand Prix Boka
4th Overall Grand Prix Bradlo
4th Tour of Vojvodina II
7th Overall Dookoła Mazowsza

1st Points classification
1st Young rider classification
1st Stages 2 & 5

9th Giro del Belvedere
10th Road race, UEC European Under-23 Championships
2010 (5 pro wins)
Paris–Nice

1st Points classification
1st Stages 3 & 5

1st Stage 1 Tour de Romandie
2nd Grand Prix Cycliste de Montréal
2nd Philadelphia International Championship
2nd Giro del Veneto
4th Giro della Romagna
7th GP Ouest–France
8th Overall Tour of California

1st Points classification
1st Young rider classification
1st Stages 5 & 6

2011 (15)
1st Road race, National Championships
1st Overall Tour de Pologne

1st Points classification
1st Stages 4 & 5

1st Overall Giro di Sardegna

1st Points classification
1st Stages 1, 3 & 4

1st Gran Premio Industria e Commercio di Prato
Vuelta a España

1st Stages 6, 12 & 21
Held after Stage 7

Tour de Suisse

1st Points classification
1st Stages 3 & 8

Tour of California

1st Points classification
1st Stage 5

2nd Philadelphia International Championship
3rd Classica Sarda
4th Gran Premio della Costa Etruschi
2012 (16)
1st Road race, National Championships
Tour de France

1st Points classification
1st Stages 1, 3 & 6
Combativity award Stage 14

Tour of California

1st Points classification
1st Stages 1, 2, 3, 4 & 8

Tour de Suisse

1st Points classification
1st Stages 1 (ITT), 3, 4 & 6

Tour of Oman

1st Points classification
1st Stage 2

1st Stage 4 Tirreno–Adriatico
1st Stage 1 Three Days of De Panne
2nd Gent–Wevelgem
2nd Dutch Food Valley Classic
3rd Amstel Gold Race
4th Milan–San Remo
5th Tour of Flanders
8th UCI World Tour
2013 (22)
1st Road race, National Championships
1st Gent–Wevelgem
1st Grand Prix Cycliste de Montréal
1st Brabantse Pijl
1st Gran Premio Città di Camaiore
Tour de France

1st Points classification
1st Stage 7

Tour de Suisse

1st Points classification
1st Stages 3 & 8

USA Pro Cycling Challenge

1st Points classification
1st Stages 1, 3, 6 & 7

Tour of Alberta

1st Points classification
1st Prologue, Stages 1 & 5

Tour of California

1st Points classification
1st Stages 3 & 8

Tirreno–Adriatico

1st Stages 3 & 6

Tour of Oman

1st Stages 2 & 3

1st Stage 1 Three Days of De Panne
2nd Strade Bianche
2nd Milan–San Remo
2nd E3 Harelbeke
2nd Tour of Flanders
4th UCI World Tour
6th Road race, UCI World Championships
10th Grand Prix Cycliste de Québec
2014 (7)
1st Road race, National Championships
1st E3 Harelbeke
Tour de France

1st Points classification
Held after Stages 1–7

Tirreno–Adriatico

1st Points classification
1st Stage 3

Tour de Suisse

1st Points classification
1st Stage 3

Tour of California

1st Points classification
1st Stage 7

1st Stage 4 Tour of Oman
1st Stage 1 Three Days of De Panne
2nd Strade Bianche
3rd Gent–Wevelgem
6th Paris–Roubaix
7th Coppa Bernocchi
10th Milan–San Remo
2015 (10)
1st Road race, UCI World Championships
National Championships

1st Road race
1st Time trial

1st Overall Tour of California

1st Stages 4 & 6 (ITT)

Tour de France

1st Points classification
Held after Stages 3–9
Combativity award Stages 15 & 16

Tirreno–Adriatico

1st Points classification
1st Stage 6

Tour de Suisse

1st Points classification
1st Stages 3 & 6

Vuelta a España

1st Stage 3
Held after Stages 4–6

4th Milan–San Remo
4th Tour of Flanders
6th Overall Tour of Qatar

1st Young rider classification

10th Gent–Wevelgem
2016 (14)
1st UCI World Tour
1st Road race, UCI World Championships
1st Road race, UEC European Championships
1st Tour of Flanders
1st Gent–Wevelgem
1st Grand Prix Cycliste de Québec
Tour de France

1st Points classification
1st Stages 2, 11 & 16
Held after Stages 2–4
Combativity award Stage 10 & Overall

Tour of California

1st Points classification
1st Stages 1 & 4

Tour de Suisse

1st Stages 2 & 3

2nd Road race, National Championships
2nd Overall Tirreno–Adriatico

1st Points classification

2nd Omloop Het Nieuwsblad
2nd E3 Harelbeke
2nd Grand Prix Cycliste de Montréal
3rd Overall Eneco Tour

1st Points classification
1st Stages 3 & 4

4th Strade Bianche
7th Kuurne–Brussels–Kuurne
2017 (12)
1st Road race, UCI World Championships
1st Grand Prix Cycliste de Québec
1st Kuurne–Brussels–Kuurne
1st Stage 3 Tour de France
Tirreno–Adriatico

1st Points classification
1st Stages 3 & 5

Tour de Suisse

1st Points classification
1st Stages 5 & 8

Tour of California

1st Points classification
1st Stage 3

Tour de Pologne

1st Points classification
1st Stage 1

2nd Road race, National Championships
2nd Milan–San Remo
2nd Omloop Het Nieuwsblad
3rd Gent–Wevelgem
4th UCI World Tour
7th Overall BinckBank Tour

1st Points classification
1st Stages 1 & 3

9th Grand Prix Cycliste de Montréal
2018 (8)
1st Road race, National Championships
1st Paris–Roubaix
1st Gent–Wevelgem
Tour de France

1st Points classification
1st Stages 2, 5 & 13
Held after Stage 2

Tour de Suisse

1st Points classification
1st Stage 2

Tour Down Under

1st Points classification
1st Stage 4

2nd UCI World Tour
4th Amstel Gold Race
6th Tour of Flanders
6th Milan–San Remo
8th Strade Bianche
10th EuroEyes Cyclassics
Vuelta a España

Held after Stage 10

2019 (4)
Tour de France

1st Points classification
1st Stage 5

Tour de Suisse

1st Points classification
1st Stage 3

1st Stage 1 Tour of California
1st Stage 3 Tour Down Under
2nd Grand Prix Cycliste de Québec
4th Road race, National Championships
4th Milan–San Remo
5th Road race, UCI World Championships
5th Paris–Roubaix
6th EuroEyes Cyclassics
2020 (1)
Giro d'Italia

1st Stage 10
Held after Stage 2
Held after Stages 4–5

4th Milan–San Remo
4th Milano–Torino
Tour de France

Held after Stages 3–4 & 7–9

2021 (5)
1st Road race, National Championships
1st Overall Okolo Slovenska

1st Points classification

Giro d'Italia

1st Points classification
1st Stage 10

1st Stage 1 Tour de Romandie
1st Stage 6 Volta a Catalunya
4th Milan–San Remo
2022 (2)
1st Road race, National Championships
1st Stage 3 Tour de Suisse
5th Milano–Torino
7th Road race, UCI World Championships
2023
2nd Road race, National Championships
8th Overall Four Days of Dunkirk
9th Tour de Vendée

==== Criteriums ====
2011
2nd Criterium de Alcobendas
2012
1st Criterium Aalst
1st Profronde van Lommel
1st Internationaal Criterium Bavikhove
2nd Profronde van Stiphout
2nd Profronde van Surhuisterveen
2nd Antwerpen Derny Rennen
2nd Oslo Grand Prix
3rd Tourcriterium Ninove
3rd Gouden Pijl
2013
2nd Saitama Critérium by le Tour de France
2014
2nd Tour de France Saitama Critérium
2015
1st Criterium Aalst
1st Profronde van Surhuisterveen
2nd Profronde van Lommel
2016
1st Tour de France Saitama Critérium
2017
3rd Down Under Classic
2018
1st Down Under Classic
1st Tour de France Shanghai Criterium
1st Criterium Aalst
1st Criterium Roeselare
1st Criterium Herentals
2019
2nd Down Under Classic
3rd Profronde Etten-Leur
2021
1st Giro d'Italia Criterium Dubai

==== Classic results timeline ====
Monument	2010	2011	2012	2013	2014	2015	2016	2017	2018	2019	2020	2021	2022	2023
Milan–San Remo	—	17	4	2	10	4	12	2	6	4	4	4	92	44
Tour of Flanders	—	DNF	5	2	16	4	1	27	6	11	—	15	—	DNF
Paris–Roubaix	DNF	86	—	—	6	23	11	38	1	5	NH	57	—	DNF
Liège–Bastogne–Liège	Did not contest during his career													
Giro di Lombardia	DNF	—	—	DNF	—	—	—	—	—	—	—	—	—	—
Classic	2010	2011	2012	2013	2014	2015	2016	2017	2018	2019	2020	2021	2022	2023
Omloop Het Nieuwsblad	66	—	—	—	—	—	2	2	—	—	—	—	98	117
Kuurne–Brussels–Kuurne	DNF	—	—	NH	—	—	7	1	—	—	—	—	117	33
Strade Bianche	—	—	26	2	2	31	4	DNF	8	—	DNF	—	—	104
E3 Harelbeke	—	—	14	2	1	30	2	108	26	17	NH	—	68	DNF
Gent–Wevelgem	—	49	2	1	3	10	1	3	1	32	—	—	DNF	83
Scheldeprijs	—	—	—	—	70	72	DNF	DNF	—	—	—	—	—	—
Brabantse Pijl	—	—	DNF	1	—	—	—	—	—	—	—	—	—	—
Amstel Gold Race	—	97	3	36	—	—	—	—	4	DNF	NH	—	—	—
La Flèche Wallonne	—	—	—	12	—	—	—	—	—	DNF	—	—	—	—
Clásica de San Sebastián	—	—	—	—	DNF	—	—	—	—	—	NH	—	—	—
Hamburg Cyclassics	79	—	14	—	—	—	—	—	10	6	Not held		31	—
Bretagne Classic	7	—	DNF	—	—	—	DNF	—	—	—	—	—	107	DNF
Grand Prix Cycliste de Québec	19	—	26	10	—	—	1	1	—	2	Not held		DNF	—
Grand Prix Cycliste de Montréal	2	—	12	1	—	—	2	9	—	18	Not held		DNF	—

==== General classification results timeline ====
Stage race general classification results
Race	2010	2011	2012	2013	2014	2015	2016	2017	2018	2019	2020	2021	2022	2023
Tour Down Under	28	—	—	—	—	—	—	71	32	55	—	Not held		—
Tour of Qatar	—	—	39	—	—	6	—	Race discontinued						
Tour of Oman	—	—	36	DNF	49	51	—	—	—	—	Not held		—	—
Paris–Nice	16	DNF	—	—	—	—	—	—	—	—	DNF	—	—	—
Tirreno–Adriatico	—	—	43	33	29	50	2	47	43	105	—	130	DNF	98
Volta a Catalunya	—	—	—	—	—	—	—	—	—	—	NH	126	—	—
Tour de Romandie	12	—	—	—	—	—	—	—	—	—	NH	77	—	—
Tour of California	8	35	42	56	55	1	35	39	58	79	Not held			
Critérium du Dauphiné	—	—	—	—	—	—	—	—	—	—	DNF	—	—	—
Tour de Suisse	DNF	50	65	48	68	30	111	72	76	76	NH	—	DNF	98
Tour de Pologne	—	1	—	—	—	—	—	35	—	—	—	—	—	—
/ Benelux Tour	—	—	—	—	—	—	3	7	—	—	—	42	NH	—

==== Major championships timeline ====
Event		2009	2010	2011	2012	2013	2014	2015	2016	2017	2018	2019	2020	2021	2022	2023
Olympic Games	Road race	Not held			34	Not held			—	Not held				—	Not held	
Olympic Games	Cross-country	Not held			—	Not held			35	Not held				—	Not held	
World Championships	Team time trial	Not held			4	7	9	27	—	—	—	Race did not exist				
World Championships	Road race	—	DNF	12	14	6	43	1	1	1	DNF	5	—	26	7	DNF
European Championships	Road race	Elite race did not exist							1	—	DNF	—	—	DNF	—	—
National Championships	Time trial	—	—	—	—	—	—	1	—	—	—	—	—	—	—	—
National Championships	Road race	10	—	1	1	1	1	1	2	2	1	4	—	1	1	2

==== Grand Tour record ====
	2011	2012	2013	2014	2015	2016	2017	2018	2019	2020	2021	2022	2023
Giro d'Italia	DNE	DNE	DNE	DNE	DNE	DNE	DNE	DNE	DNE	92	117	DNE	DNE
Stages won	—	—	—	—	—	—	—	—	—	1	1	—	—
Points classification	—	—	—	—	—	—	—	—	—	2	1	—	—
Tour de France	DNE	42	82	60	46	95	DSQ-4	71	82	84	DNS-12	116	127
Stages won	—	3	1	0	0	3	1	3	1	0	0	0	0
Points classification	—	1	1	1	1	1	—	1	1	2	—	9	54
Vuelta a España	121	DNE	DNE	DNF-14	DNS-9	DNE	DNE	119	DNE	DNE	DNE	DNE	DNE
Stages won	3	—	—	0	1	—	—	0	—	—	—	—	—
Points classification	4	—	—	—	—	—	—	2	—	—	—	—	—

Legend
1	Winner
2–3	Top three-finish
4–10	Top ten-finish
11–	Other finish
DNE	Did not enter
DNF-x	Did not finish (retired on stage x)
DNS-x	Did not start (not started on stage x)
HD-x	Finished outside time limit (occurred on stage x)
DSQ	Disqualified
N/A	Race/classification not held
NR	Not ranked in this classification

==== Number of wins per year ====
This table includes number of wins, second-, third-, top 10-place finishes, Points classification wins and race days per year excluding UCI level 2 races.

	2009	2010	2011	2012	2013	2014	2015	2016	2017	2018	2019	2020	2021	2022	2023	Total
Wins	0	5	15	16	22	7	10	14	12	8	4	1	5	2	0	121
2nd	0	8	7	8	10	11	18	12	11	10	8	6	3	0	2	114
3rd	0	1	4	5	5	7	5	6	4	8	5	3	4	0	0	57
Top 3	0	14	26	29	37	25	33	32	27	26	17	10	12	2	1	291
Top 10	1	23	35	40	50	46	52	47	37	44	35	22	23	10	2	467
Points	0	2	4	4	5	4	3	4	5	3	2	0	2	0	0	38
Days	1	51	75	77	90	91	79	73	61	82	71	64	70	48	59	992

As of 25 August 2023

==== World ranking ====
Ranking	2009	2010	2011	2012	2013	2014	2015	2016	2017	2018	2019	2020	2021
UCI World Tour	—	44	21	8	4	15	17	1	4	2	No individual standings		
UCI One Day Race	Ranking did not exist										10	52	91
UCI Stage Race	Ranking did not exist										36	41	47
UCI World Ranking	Ranking did not exist							1	3	4	10	45	57
UCI America Tour	—	—	—	—	—	—	—	66	—	—	—	—	—
UCI Asia Tour	—	—	—	—	—	—	—	—	2	—	—	—	—
UCI Europe Tour	64	—	—	—	—	—	—	19	193	460	9	35	48

== Awards ==
- Slovak Sportsperson of the Year: 2013, 2015, 2017
- International Flandrien of the Year: 2015, 2016
- Vélo d'Or: 2016
