= Alexandr Kolobnev =

Russian road bicycle racer (born 1981)

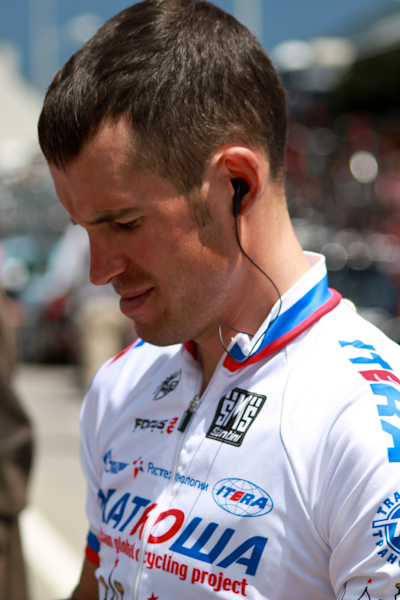
- Kolobnev in 2011

Personal information
- Full name: Alexandr Vasilievich Kolobnev
- Born: 4 May 1981 (age 45) Vyksa, Soviet Union
- Height: 1.74 m (5 ft 9 in)
- Weight: 64 kg (141 lb)

Cycling career
- Sport: Cycling
- Current team: Retired
- Discipline: Road
- Role: Rider
- Rider type: Classics specialist

Professional teams
- 2002: Acqua & Sapone–Cantina Tollo
- 2003–2004: Domina Vacanze–Elitron
- 2005–2006: Rabobank
- 2007–2009: Team CSC
- 2010–2015: Team Katusha
- 2016: Gazprom–RusVelo

Major wins
- One-day races and Classics National Road Race Championships (2004, 2010) Monte Paschi Eroica (2007)
Medal record
Representing Russia
Men's road bicycle racing
Olympic Games
Bronze medal – third place	2008 Beijing	Men's road race
World Championships
Silver medal – second place	2007 Stuttgart	Men's road race
Silver medal – second place	2009 Mendrisio	Men's road race

Alexandr Vasilievich Kolobnev (Александр Васильевич Колобнев; born 4 May 1981) is a Russian former professional road bicycle racer. His major victories include winning the 2007 Monte Paschi Eroica, a stage of the 2007 Paris–Nice and he is a two-time winner of the Russian National Road Race Championships. In 2011, he was provisionally suspended after testing positive for a potential drug masking agent. He was cleared of intentional doping by the Court of Arbitration for Sport in February 2012, and returned to Team Katusha in March 2012.

== Career ==
Born in Vyksa, Russian SFSR, Kolobnev spent his neo-pro year in 2002 with Acqua & Sapone–Cantina Tollo. His second season saw him sign with Domina Vacanze–Elitron. There, he took his first victory in Stage 2 of the Settimana Internazionale di Coppi e Bartali. He stayed with Domina Vacanze through the 2004 season and signed with UCI ProTeam Rabobank for 2005. With Rabobank he managed to capture Stage 1 of the Volta a la Comunitat Valenciana in 2006.

In 2007 he transferred to Team CSC. He won the third stage of Paris–Nice, became the inaugural winner of the Monte Paschi Eroica, now known as Strade Bianche, and finished second at the UCI Road World Championships. Kolobnev finished fourth in the road race at the 2008 Olympic Games. Second-place finisher Davide Rebellin later tested positive for Continuous erythropoietin receptor activator (CERA), causing the IOC to strip him of his silver medal. Kolobnev was promoted to third in the race's standings by the UCI. However, he was not awarded the bronze medal until 2011.

== Controversies ==
=== Exonerated doping test ===
In the 2011 Tour de France he tested positive for the diuretic hydrochlorothiazide, a masking agent that can hide the presence of performance-enhancing drugs. He was subsequently pulled from the tour by his team, and his results for that stage were annulled. Despite his B sample also testing positive he only received a fine from the Russian cycling federation. However this was later appealed by the UCI to CAS, although he was subsequently cleared of any charges on 29 February 2012. Kolobnev rejoined Team Katusha in March 2012.

=== Acquitted on case 2010 Liège–Bastogne–Liège ===
In 2012, the Union Cycliste Internationale initiated an investigation of Kolobnev and the Kazakh rider Alexander Vinokourov over allegations brought by the Swiss news magazine L'lllustre and Italian newspaper Corriere della Sera. They accused Vinokourov of cutting a deal with Kolobnev in 2010 to aid Vinokourov in winning Liège–Bastogne–Liège, alleging €150,000 exchanged hands. On 12 September 2019, prosecutors requested a six-month jail sentence for Kolobnev and Vinokourov, with an additional fine of €50,000 for Kolobnev, as well as €150,000 to be confiscated from his bank account. Kolobnev and Vinokourov were cleared on 5 November 2019, with the judge citing a "lack of concrete evidence" for the court's decision.

== Personal life ==
He lives in Dénia, Spain, with his wife Daria and two sons and one daughter, David, Alexander and Aprelia. He opened a hotel in Dénia which had several altitude simulation rooms, a permitted method to increase athletic performance.

== Major results ==
1999
1st Overall Giro della Lunigiana
2001
1st Gran Premio di Poggiana
4th Road race, UCI Under-23 Road World Championships
4th Gran Premio Industrie del Marmo
2002
9th GP Industria & Artigianato di Larciano
2003 (1 pro win)
2nd Gran Premio di Lugano
2nd Giro dell'Emilia
4th Overall Settimana Internazionale di Coppi e Bartali

1st Stage 2

4th Coppa Sabatini
5th La Flèche Wallonne
6th Trofeo Città di Castelfidardo
2004 (1)
1st Road race, National Road Championships
1st Young rider classification, Settimana Internazionale di Coppi e Bartali
2nd Gran Premio Nobili Rubinetterie
7th Overall Brixia Tour
8th Gran Premio di Lugano
8th Trofeo Matteotti
10th Road race, Olympic Games
2005
2nd Overall Niedersachsen Rundfahrt
7th Road race, UCI Road World Championships
8th Overall Danmark Rundt
2006 (1)
4th Overall Volta a la Comunitat Valenciana

1st Stage 1

5th Overall Tour de Pologne
7th Overall Sachsen Tour
9th Rund um den Henninger Turm
2007 (2)
1st Monte Paschi Eroica
1st Stage 3 Paris–Nice
1st Stage 2 (TTT) Deutschland Tour
2nd Road race, UCI Road World Championships
5th Overall Tour de Wallonie
9th Giro dell'Emilia
2008
2nd Clásica de San Sebastián
3rd Road race, Olympic Games
3rd Giro dell'Emilia
5th Klasika Primavera
5th Coppa Sabatini
6th Overall Tour de Wallonie
2009
2nd Road race, UCI Road World Championships
2nd GP Miguel Induráin
3rd Overall Tour de Wallonie
3rd Giro di Lombardia
4th Overall Tour of Ireland
6th Amstel Gold Race
7th Giro dell'Emilia
9th Overall Tour of Slovenia
9th Clásica de Almería
9th Liège–Bastogne–Liège
2010 (1)
1st Road race, National Road Championships
2nd Liège–Bastogne–Liège
3rd GP Miguel Induráin
4th Giro dell'Emilia
7th Road race, UCI Road World Championships
2011
2nd GP Miguel Induráin
5th Road race, National Road Championships
5th Amstel Gold Race
2012
2nd Road race, National Road Championships
3rd Grand Prix Cycliste de Montréal
4th Overall Tour de Pologne
5th Grand Prix of Aargau Canton
9th Trofeo Melinda
2013 (1)
3rd Overall Tour de Wallonie

1st Stage 1

3rd Tre Valli Varesine
7th Strade Bianche
9th Coppa Ugo Agostoni
2014
7th GP Miguel Induráin
10th Grand Prix of Aargau Canton
2016
1st Mountains classification, Volta ao Algarve
10th Overall Giro di Toscana

=== Grand Tour general classification results timeline ===
Grand Tour	2005	2006	2007	2008	2009	2010	2011	2012	2013	2014	2015	2016
Giro d'Italia	21	71	DNF	—	—	—	—	—	—	—	—	73
Tour de France	—	—	—	—	—	65	DNF	—	—	—	—	—
Vuelta a España	54	—	51	40	31	29	—	—	—	40	—	—

=== Classics results timeline ===
Monument	2002	2003	2004	2005	2006	2007	2008	2009	2010	2011	2012	2013	2014	2015	2016
Milan–San Remo	—	—	—	—	—	—	—	—	46	51	—	—	DNF	73	—
Tour of Flanders	—	—	94	—	—	—	—	—	—	—	—	—	—	—	—
Paris–Roubaix	Did not contest during his career														
Liège–Bastogne–Liège	—	44	39	—	60	45	44	9	2	11	—	75	33	—	—
Giro di Lombardia	—	56	DNF	—	23	11	13	3	DNF	—	14	DNF	13	—	DNF
Classic	2002	2003	2004	2005	2006	2007	2008	2009	2010	2011	2012	2013	2014	2015	2016
Strade Bianche	Race did not exist					1	—	—	—	—	—	7	74	—	—
Amstel Gold Race	DNF	51	64	—	—	53	36	6	21	5	—	19	19	—	—
La Flèche Wallonne	—	5	59	—	29	53	DNF	21	74	81	—	96	48	—	—
Clásica de San Sebastián	—	61	101	33	19	DNF	2	15	45	—	—	21	11	—	—
Grand Prix Cycliste de Québec	Race did not exist								—	—	38	22	—	—	—
Grand Prix Cycliste de Montréal	Race did not exist								—	—	3	30	—	—	—
Giro dell'Emilia	—	2	11	—	12	9	3	7	4	—	—	—	—	—	DNF

=== Major championship results timeline ===
	2002	2003	2004	2005	2006	2007	2008	2009	2010	2011	2012	2013	2014	2015	2016
Olympic Games	Not held		10	Not held			3	Not held			24	Not held			—
World Championships	153	49	DNF	7	26	2	44	2	7	—	28	DNF	46	—	—
National Championships	—	—	1	—	—	—	—	—	1	5	2	8	9	—	DNF

Legend
—	Did not compete
DNF	Did not finish
