= Robert Gesink =

Dutch road bicycle racer

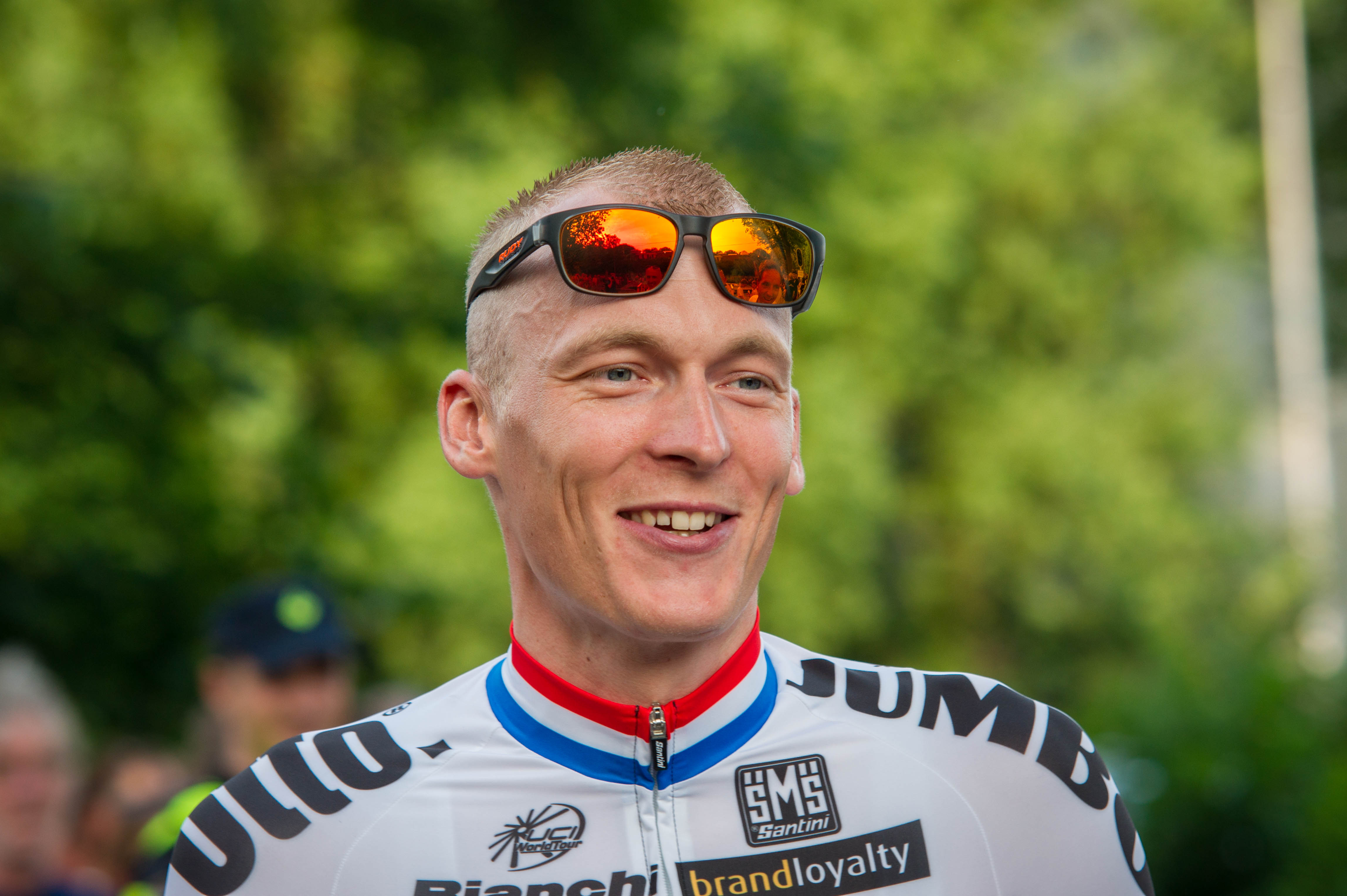
- Gesink in 2015

Personal information
- Full name: Robert Gesink
- Nickname: The Condor of Varsseveld
- Born: 31 May 1986 (age 40) Varsseveld, the Netherlands
- Height: 1.89 m (6 ft 2 1/2 in)
- Weight: 70 kg (154 lb; 11 st 0 lb)

Cycling career
- Sport: Cycling
- Current team: Retired
- Discipline: Road
- Role: Rider
- Rider type: All-rounder

Amateur team
- until 2005: De Peddelaars

Professional teams
- 2005: Team Löwik Meubelen–Van Losser
- 2006: Rabobank Continental Team
- 2007–2024: Rabobank

Major wins
- Grand Tours Vuelta a España 1 individual stage (2016) 1 TTT stage (2022) Stage races Tour of California (2012) Tour of Oman (2011) Single-day races and Classics Giro dell'Emilia (2009, 2010) GP Montréal (2010) GP Québec (2013)

Robert Gesink (born 31 May 1986) is a Dutch former cyclist, who competed as a professional from 2007 to 2024. His major victories include the 2012 Tour of California, the 2011 Tour of Oman and the 2010 Grand Prix Cycliste de Montréal. Gesink also won the Giro dell'Emilia twice and offered some good performances on Grand Tours and one-week stage races, thanks in part to his climbing and time trialing abilities.

== Career ==
=== Early years ===
Gesink was born in Varsseveld. At the Junior World Championships of 2004 UCI Road World Championships in Verona, Gesink finished eighth in the individual time trial and sixth in the road race, while riding for team De Peddelaars in Aalten. After this rather successful WC he went to team Lowik-Van Losser for one year. He joined the Rabobank Continental team in 2006. He finished third overall in Volta ao Algarve and won the overall classification and the third stage of Settimana Ciclistica Lombarda. He later won a stage and the overall classification of the Circuito Montañés and finished second in the prestigious Tour de l'Avenir. Gesink initially signed a two-year deal with Rabobank Continental but team manager Theo de Rooij decided to move him to the Rabobank team for the 2007 season.

=== 2007 ===
In his first year as professional cyclist, Gesink won the young riders jersey in the Tour of California. He finished 9th in his first UCI ProTour race ever, in La Flèche Wallonne. After riding another top 15 in the Tour de Romandie won by his teammate Thomas Dekker, he won his first race as professional at the queen stage in the Tour of Belgium riding away from everyone on Côte de La Redoute. The next year, he finished just outside the top ten in the Clásica de San Sebastián, fifth in the Deutschland Tour, and second in the Tour de Pologne. He subsequently got selected for the UCI Road World Championships in Stuttgart. In the Giro di Lombardia he finished fifteenth.

=== 2008 ===
In his 2nd year as professional, in 2008, he showed progression by winning the hardest stage in the Tour of California, where Gesink rode away on the final climb, with only Levi Leipheimer holding his wheel. They stayed ahead on the final 35 kilometres (22 miles) of downhill and flat and Leipheimer did not contest Gesink in the sprint. Gesink won the young riders jersey again and finished 9th in the general classification. In the Paris–Nice he finished second in the stage up to Mont Serein, 5 kilometres (3.1 miles) before the top of Mont Ventoux, where he was outsprinted by Cadel Evans. He then lost the leader's jersey in the penultimate stage to Cannes, when he got isolated on the Col du Tanneron which, together with Gesink's overly careful descent, allowed Davide Rebellin to take the leader's jersey. He finished fourth in the overall classification, 51 seconds behind Rebellin, which won Gesink the youth classification. He also finished twelfth in the Tour of the Basque Country and completed a successful Ardennes classics by finishing fourth in La Flèche Wallonne. In September, he then finished seventh in his first Grand Tour, the Vuelta a España.

=== 2009 ===
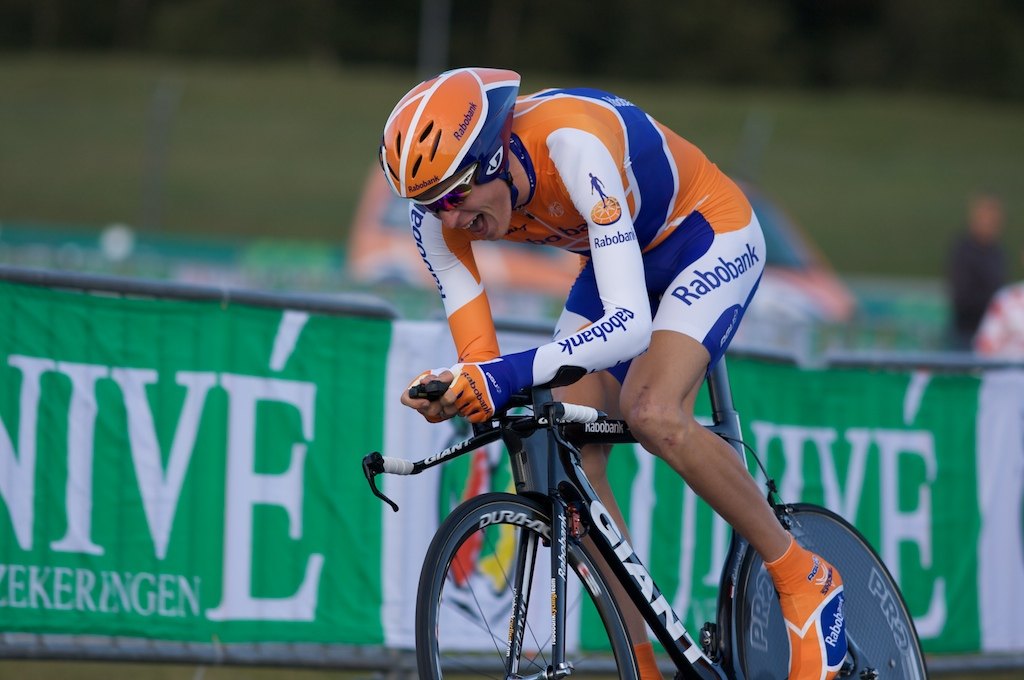
Gesink at the 2009 Vuelta a Espana

In 2009, Gesink finished fourth overall in the Critérium du Dauphiné Libéré. He started his first Tour de France but broke his wrist during a crash on stage 5. He completed the stage, but had to withdraw from the Tour due to his injuries. He recovered in time to enter into the Vuelta a España. He finished the Vuelta a España in 6th place; he was in 2nd place, but due to a fall where he sustained deep cuts in his knee, he was too injured to keep up in the final mountain stage. Afterwards Gesink focused on regaining his form for the World Championships in Mendrisio, but he had not recovered fast enough and finished off the pace. However, a week later he was back to his old self and took the victory in the Giro dell'Emilia, beating Jakob Fuglsang and Thomas Löfkvist to the line in an uphill sprint. He also took 6th place in the Giro di Lombardia and finished the season as 10th on the UCI World Ranking.

=== 2010 ===
Gesink's schedule for 2010 was about the same as that of 2009, only this time he did manage to get a good result in the Tirreno–Adriatico (fifth). Due to the absence of, among others, Alberto Contador and Cadel Evans, he started as one of the favorites for the Tour of the Basque Country. He impressed during the most important stage, was in the top 3 and even had a chance at winning the tour, when in stage 5 he fell once again. Eventually he finished 9th and seemed to have the form he needed for the Classics. In the Amstel Gold Race, La Flèche Wallonne and Liège–Bastogne–Liège he had disappointing races and could not compete for the victories. After that he went to altitude training in the Sierra Nevada mountains. He did not compete in any events for a while, while focusing on the Tour de France. His form showed during the Tour de Suisse, where he was victorious in the most difficult stage. With this win he took over the leader's jersey from Tony Martin. In the closing time trial he had a bad day and lost his leading position to Fränk Schleck, and finally finished fifth.

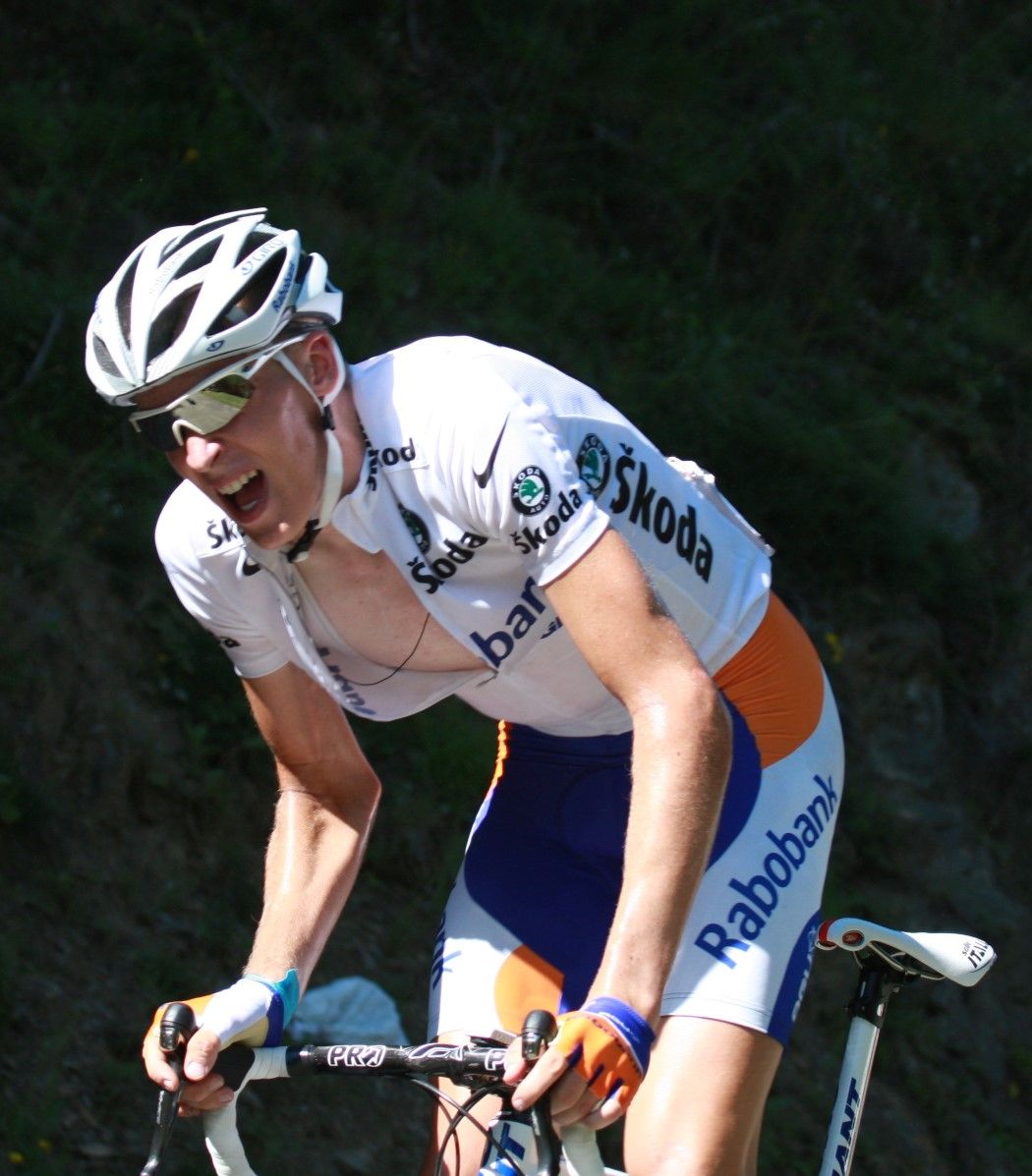
Gesink wearing the white jersey at the 2010 Tour de France

He participated in the Tour de France for the second time and completed it for the first time in 6th place in the general classification, the highest finishing position for a Dutch rider in over a decade, and 2nd in the young rider classification. After Contador and Denis Menchov were disqualified because of doping issues, Gesink formally ended 4th. He also wore the white jersey as leader of the young rider classification from stages 10 to 15. After the Tour, Gesink won the Giro dell'Emilia for the second straight year. In October, Gesink had to mourn his father, who died as the result of a cycling accident.

=== 2011 ===
The start of Gesink's 2011 season was productive, with two stage wins in the Tour of Oman (one uphill finish and one individual time trial in which he beat World Champion Fabian Cancellara), and winning the overall classification and the youth classification. He took the race lead after the 4th stage of the Tirreno–Adriatico, but lost it a day later to Cadel Evans. In the closing time trial, Gesink climbed in the general classification from fifth to second overall. He continued to show his good form in the Tour of the Basque Country where he finished third overall. He did not continue this good form in the Ardennes classics and a ninth place at the Amstel Gold Race was his best performance in the three races dominated by Philippe Gilbert. In September he suffered a crash in training where he broke his leg in four places, and had a surgical operation which left screws and pins in his body.

=== 2012 ===
After an unproductive start to the season, Gesink found his form in the Tour of California. He finished third in the stage 5 time trial and enjoyed a prestigious victory on the slopes of Mount Baldy in stage 7 of the race, where he attacked 4.5 kilometres (2.8 mi) from the finish to take the leader's jersey and the mountaintop stage win. His leading position was never seriously tested in the short final stage, and he won his first tour since the 2011 Tour of Oman. For the Tour de France, he was considered one of the Dutch hopefuls who might finish in the top ten, but he fell in the massive crash that occurred on the sixth stage, damaging his ribs. After battling through the pain, he abandoned on stage 11. He then went on to participate in the Vuelta a España, and he made an impact by finishing in sixth position overall behind the winner Alberto Contador (Saxo Bank–Tinkoff Bank). Gesink was always competitive in the mountains, which allowed him to retain such a high placing.

=== 2013 ===
Gesink had an uneventful 2013 season. He aimed to win the Giro d'Italia though he abandoned in the second week. His only victory was the Grand Prix Cycliste de Québec in September.

=== 2014 ===
Gesink had a promising start to his 2014 season finishing 6th in the Tour Down Under and 5th in the Tour of Oman. His season however was disrupted by heart problems for which he received surgery, preventing him from riding the Tour de France, switching his hopes to the Vuelta a España. However, while he was in seventh position overall at the Vuelta, he withdrew before Stage 18 to be with his pregnant wife who was hospitalized.

=== 2015 ===
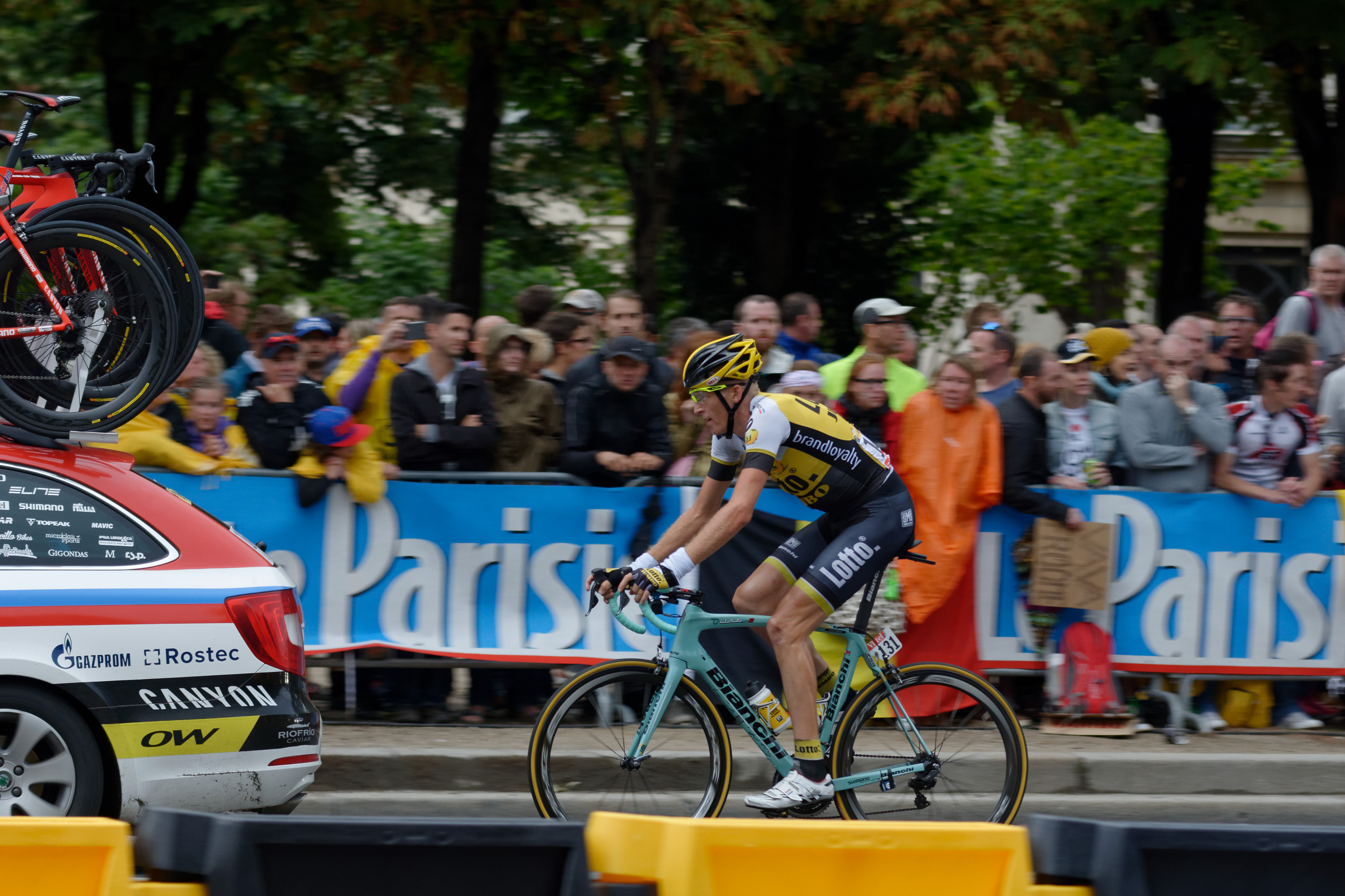
Gesink at the 2015 Tour de France

After racing the Volta ao Algarve, Gesink suffered a knee injury. He came back at La Flèche Wallonne with a 25th placing. He then raced the Tour de Romandie and finished 15th overall. Then he focused on the Tour de France, riding in the Tour de Suisse in preparation for the Grand Tour and finished in a solid 9th place. He did even better in France, where he finished 6th, right behind big names like Contador and Nibali.

=== 2016 ===
The main goal for the 2016 season was the Tour de France however Gesink crashed at the Tour de Suisse, and had no chance to recover in time for the Tour de France. He rode the Vuelta a España instead, and won Stage 14 to Col d'Aubisque. He also finished on the podium several times during that Vuelta. Gesink rode the Il Lombardia and finished 7th.

=== 2017 ===
For the 2017 season, Gesink's main goal was to win a stage at the Tour de France, and he came very close on stage 8 where he finished 2nd just behind Lilian Calmejane. Unfortunately Gesink abandoned the Tour on the following stage after a crash. He only returned to outdoor training at the start of October due to injuries.

=== 2018 ===
Gesink continued to work hard during the winter meaning he did not have an off-season like other professional riders. His goal was to get ready for the Tour Down Under which he eventually did and finished 10th overall. One week after the Tour Down Under, he rode the Cadel Evans Great Ocean Road Race and finished 11th as he did in 2017. Gesink had ambitions of winning a stage in the Giro d'Italia, and worked as a domestique to George Bennett for most of the race before eventually getting his chance on stage 20 where he finished 2nd behind Mikel Nieve. Gesink started the Tour de France, and worked for most of stage 1 in the front to close in the gap from the breakaway so that Dylan Groenewegen would have a chance to sprint for the yellow jersey, however Groenewegen only finished 6th in that sprint.

=== 2019 onwards ===
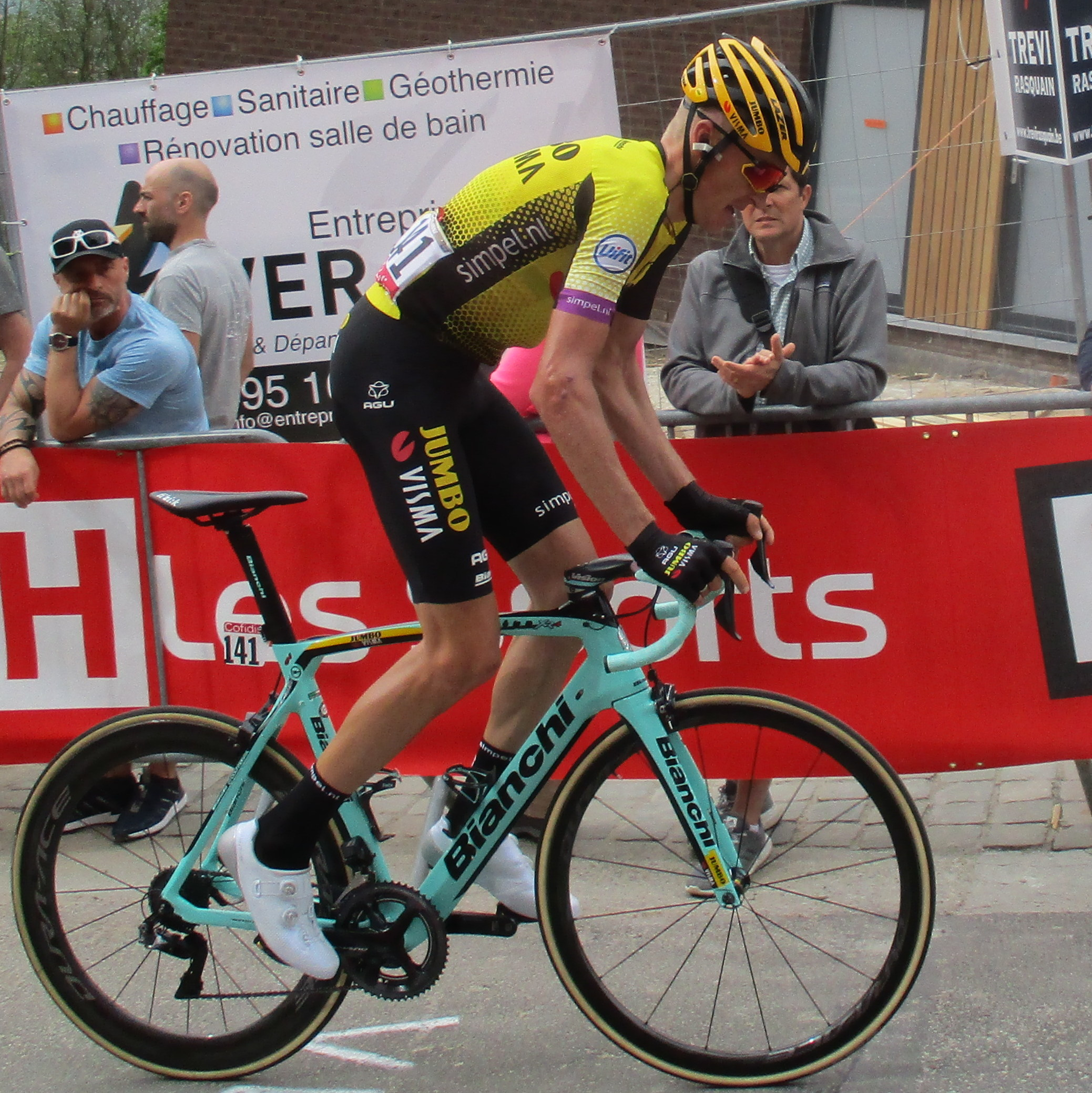
Gesink at the 2019 La Flèche Wallonne

With LottoNL–Jumbo becoming Team Jumbo–Visma from the 2019 season, Gesink's role with the team developed into that of a mountain domestique – primarily for team leader Primož Roglič – with Roglič winning the Vuelta a España in 2019, 2020 and 2021, as well as the 2019 Tirreno–Adriatico, the 2020 Tour de l'Ain and the 2023 Volta a Catalunya. At the 2022 Vuelta a España, Team Jumbo–Visma won the opening stage team time trial held in Utrecht and as Gesink was the first of the team's riders to cross the finish line, he assumed the race leader's red jersey. His first race leader's jersey since 2012, Gesink ultimately ceded the lead to teammate Mike Teunissen at the end of the following stage.

In June 2023, Gesink signed a one-year contract extension with Team Jumbo–Visma for the 2024 season, while also intimating that it would be his last season as a professional.

Gesink's wife, Daisy, died 30 May 2025, after a short illness.

== Major results ==
2004
1st Time trial, National Junior Road Championships
UCI Junior Road World Championships

6th Road race
8th Time trial

8th Overall Peace Race Juniors
2005
6th Overall Giro delle Regioni
8th Rund um Düren
2006
1st Overall Circuito Montañés

1st Stage 6

1st Overall Settimana Ciclistica Lombarda

1st Stage 3

2nd Overall Tour de l'Avenir
3rd Overall Volta ao Algarve
4th Rund um Köln
6th Road race, UCI Under-23 Road World Championships
6th Overall Tour de la Somme
7th Ronde van Vlaanderen Beloften
2007
1st Young rider classification, Tour of California
1st Stage 4 Tour of Belgium
2nd Overall Tour de Pologne
5th Overall Deutschland Tour

1st Young rider classification

5th Profronde van Fryslan
9th La Flèche Wallonne
9th Clásica de Almería
10th Giro dell'Emilia
10th Hel van het Mergelland
2008
4th Overall Paris–Nice

1st Young rider classification

4th Overall Critérium du Dauphiné Libéré
4th La Flèche Wallonne
7th Overall Vuelta a España
9th Overall Tour of California

1st Young rider classification
1st Stage 3

9th Giro dell'Emilia
10th Road race, UCI Road World Championships
Olympic Games

10th Road race
10th Time trial

2009
1st Giro dell'Emilia
3rd Amstel Gold Race
4th Overall Critérium du Dauphiné Libéré
6th Overall Vuelta a España
6th Giro di Lombardia
7th Overall Tour of the Basque Country
8th Overall Tour of California

1st Young rider classification

10th UCI World Ranking
2010
1st Grand Prix Cycliste de Montréal
1st Giro dell'Emilia
3rd Grand Prix Cycliste de Québec
4th Overall Tour de France
5th Overall Tirreno–Adriatico

1st Young rider classification

5th Overall Tour de Suisse

1st Stage 6

6th UCI World Ranking
7th Clásica de San Sebastián
8th Overall Tour of the Basque Country
8th Overall Tour Méditerranéen
2011
1st Overall Tour of Oman

1st Young rider classification
1st Stages 4 & 5 (ITT)

2nd Overall Tirreno–Adriatico

1st Young rider classification
1st Stage 1 (TTT)

2nd Grand Prix Cycliste de Québec
3rd Overall Tour of the Basque Country
9th Amstel Gold Race
Tour de France

Held after Stage 7

2012
1st Overall Tour of California

1st Stage 7

4th Overall Tour de Suisse
6th Overall Vuelta a España
6th Overall Vuelta a Burgos
8th Overall Vuelta a Murcia
2013
1st Grand Prix Cycliste de Québec
3rd Trofeo Serra de Tramuntana
4th Vuelta a Murcia
5th Overall Tour of Alberta
6th Overall Volta a Catalunya
8th Overall Tour of Beijing
9th Overall Tour de Luxembourg
10th Giro di Lombardia
2014
5th Overall Tour of Oman
6th Overall Tour Down Under
8th Overall Tour de Pologne
2015
5th Overall Tour of California
6th Overall Tour de France
8th Grand Prix Cycliste de Montréal
9th Overall Tour de Suisse
2016
1st Stage 14 Vuelta a España
7th Giro di Lombardia
2017
3rd Time trial, National Road Championships
8th Overall Tour Down Under
2018
7th Japan Cup
8th Clásica de San Sebastián
10th Overall Tour Down Under
2019
8th Japan Cup
2022
Vuelta a España

1st Stage 1 (TTT)
Held after Stage 1
Combativity award Stage 18

2023
1st Stage 2 (TTT) Vuelta a Burgos

=== General classification results timeline ===
Grand Tour general classification results
Grand Tour	2007	2008	2009	2010	2011	2012	2013	2014	2015	2016	2017	2018	2019	2020	2021	2022	2023	2024
Giro d'Italia	—	—	—	—	—	—	DNF	—	—	—	—	23	—	—	—	—	—	DNF
Tour de France	—	—	DNF	4	33	DNF	26	—	6	—	DNF	31	—	42	DNF	—	—	—
/ Vuelta a España	—	7	6	—	—	6	—	DNF	—	34	—	—	27	35	62	41	52	52
Major stage race general classification results
Race	2007	2008	2009	2010	2011	2012	2013	2014	2015	2016	2017	2018	2019	2020	2021	2022	2023	2024
Paris–Nice	—	4	—	—	—	—	DNF	—	—	—	—	38	—	—	—	—	—	
/ Tirreno–Adriatico	—	—	11	5	2	—	—	DNF	—	—	19	—	21	—	62	—	—	
Volta a Catalunya	—	—	—	—	—	19	6	—	—	26	29	DNF	—	NH	43	40	88	
Tour of the Basque Country	—	12	6	8	3	DNF	—	DNF	—	28	—	—	—	NH	—	—	—	
Tour de Romandie	13	—	—	—	—	—	54	—	15	—	26	—	—	NH	—	52	DNF	
Critérium du Dauphiné	DNF	4	4	—	20	—	—	—	—	—	—	—	—	56	43	—	—	
Tour de Suisse	—	—	—	5	—	4	—	—	9	DNF	—	—	—	NH	—	DNF	57	

=== Classics results timeline ===
Monument	2007	2008	2009	2010	2011	2012	2013	2014	2015	2016	2017	2018	2019	2020	2021	2022	2023
Milan–San Remo	Has not contested during his career																
Tour of Flanders	Has not contested during his career																
Paris–Roubaix	Has not contested during his career																
Liège–Bastogne–Liège	—	13	49	15	30	57	—	—	—	78	—	24	DNF	—	47	—	—
Giro di Lombardia	15	58	6	—	—	—	10	—	11	7	—	45	33	—	—	77	
Classic	2007	2008	2009	2010	2011	2012	2013	2014	2015	2016	2017	2018	2019	2020	2021	2022	2023
Cadel Evans Great Ocean Road Race	Race did not exist								—	—	11	11	12	—	Not held		—
Strade Bianche	—	—	—	—	—	—	—	—	—	22	—	—	—	—	69	68	—
Amstel Gold Race	—	21	3	22	9	52	—	—	—	23	—	28	21	NH	93	—	—
La Flèche Wallonne	9	4	—	14	13	22	—	—	25	15	15	20	52	—	38	58	—
Clásica de San Sebastián	12	—	—	7	—	27	13	—	—	—	—	8	—	NH	—	53	
Grand Prix Cycliste de Québec	Race did not exist			3	2	—	1	—	20	—	—	—	—	Not held		—	
Grand Prix Cycliste de Montréal	Race did not exist			1	36	—	12	—	8	—	—	—	—	Not held		—	
Giro dell'Emilia	10	9	1	1	—	—	—	—	—	—	—	48	13	—	—	29	

Legend
—	Did not compete
DNF	Did not finish
IP	In progress
NH	Not held

== See also ==
- List of Dutch Olympic cyclists
