= 2011 Tirreno–Adriatico =

2011 UCI World Tour, race 3 of 27
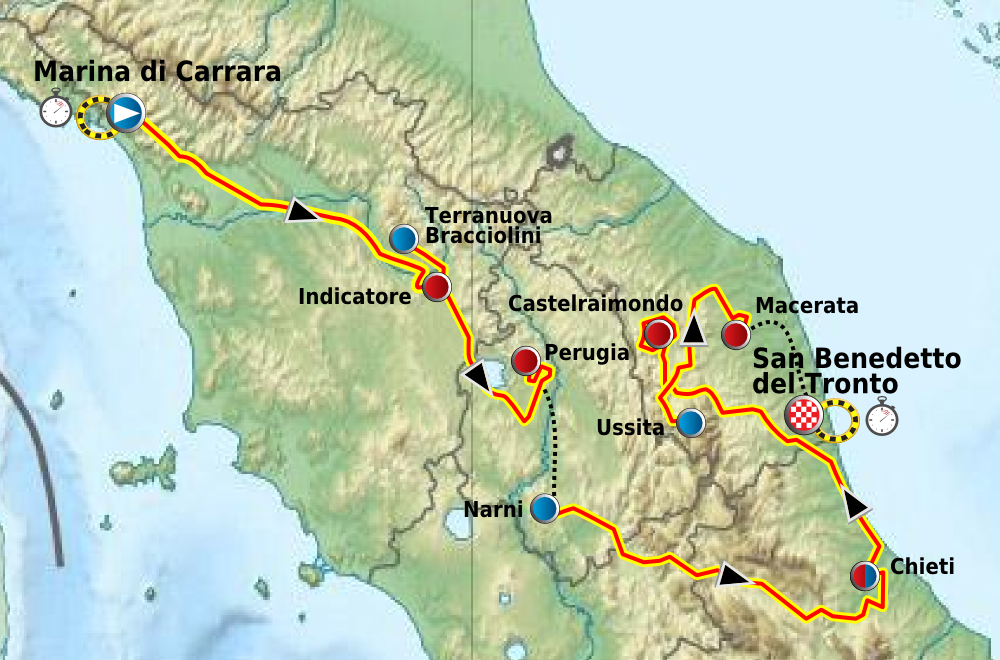

Race details
- Dates: 9–15 March 2011
- Stages: 7
- Distance: 1,075.1 km (668.0 mi)
- Winning time: 27h 37' 37"

Results
Jersey awarded to the overall winner	Winner	Cadel Evans (AUS)	(BMC Racing Team)
	Second	Robert Gesink (NED)	(Rabobank)
	Third	Michele Scarponi (ITA)	(Lampre–ISD)
Jersey awarded to the points classification winner	Points	Michele Scarponi (ITA)	(Lampre–ISD)
Jersey awarded to the mountains classification winner	Mountains	Davide Malacarne (ITA)	(Quick-Step)
Jersey awarded to the youth classification winner	Youth	Robert Gesink (NED)	(Rabobank)
	Team	Liquigas–Cannondale	

The 2011 Tirreno–Adriatico was the 46th running of the Tirreno–Adriatico cycling stage race, often known as the Race of two seas. It started on 9 March in Marina di Carrara and ended on 15 March in San Benedetto del Tronto and consisted of seven stages, including a team time trial to begin the race and an individual time trial to conclude it. It was the third race of the 2011 UCI World Tour season.

The race was won by BMC Racing Team rider Cadel Evans, who claimed the leader's blue jersey on stage five before a stage win on stage six. Evans' winning margin over runner-up Robert Gesink (Rabobank) was 11 seconds, as Gesink overhauled both Ivan Basso of Liquigas–Cannondale and Lampre–ISD's Michele Scarponi on the final time trial stage. Scarponi – winner of the fourth stage – completed the podium, 15 seconds down on Evans.

In the race's other classifications, Gesink's second place overall won him the white jersey for the highest placed rider aged 25 or under, and Scarponi took home the red jersey for amassing the highest number of points during stages at intermediate sprints and stage finishes. Quick-Step rider Davide Malacarne won the King of the Mountains classification, with Liquigas–Cannondale finishing at the head of the teams classification.

== Teams ==
The Tirreno–Adriatico was part of the 2011 UCI World Tour, so all 18 UCI ProTeams were invited automatically and obligated to attend. Two UCI Professional Continental teams were awarded wildcards. These were the Acqua & Sapone team of defending champion Stefano Garzelli and the Farnese Vini–Neri Sottoli team of Italian national champion Giovanni Visconti, both of whom were present in the race.

The full list of participating teams is:

- Acqua & Sapone
- Ag2r–La Mondiale
- Astana
- BMC Racing Team
- Euskaltel–Euskadi
- Farnese Vini–Neri Sottoli
- Garmin–Cervélo
- HTC–Highroad
- Lampre–ISD
- Leopard Trek
- Liquigas–Cannondale
- Omega Pharma–Lotto
- Quick-Step
- Rabobank
- Team Katusha
- Movistar Team
- Team RadioShack
- Saxo Bank–SunGard
- Team Sky
- Vacansoleil–DCM

== Race previews and favorites ==
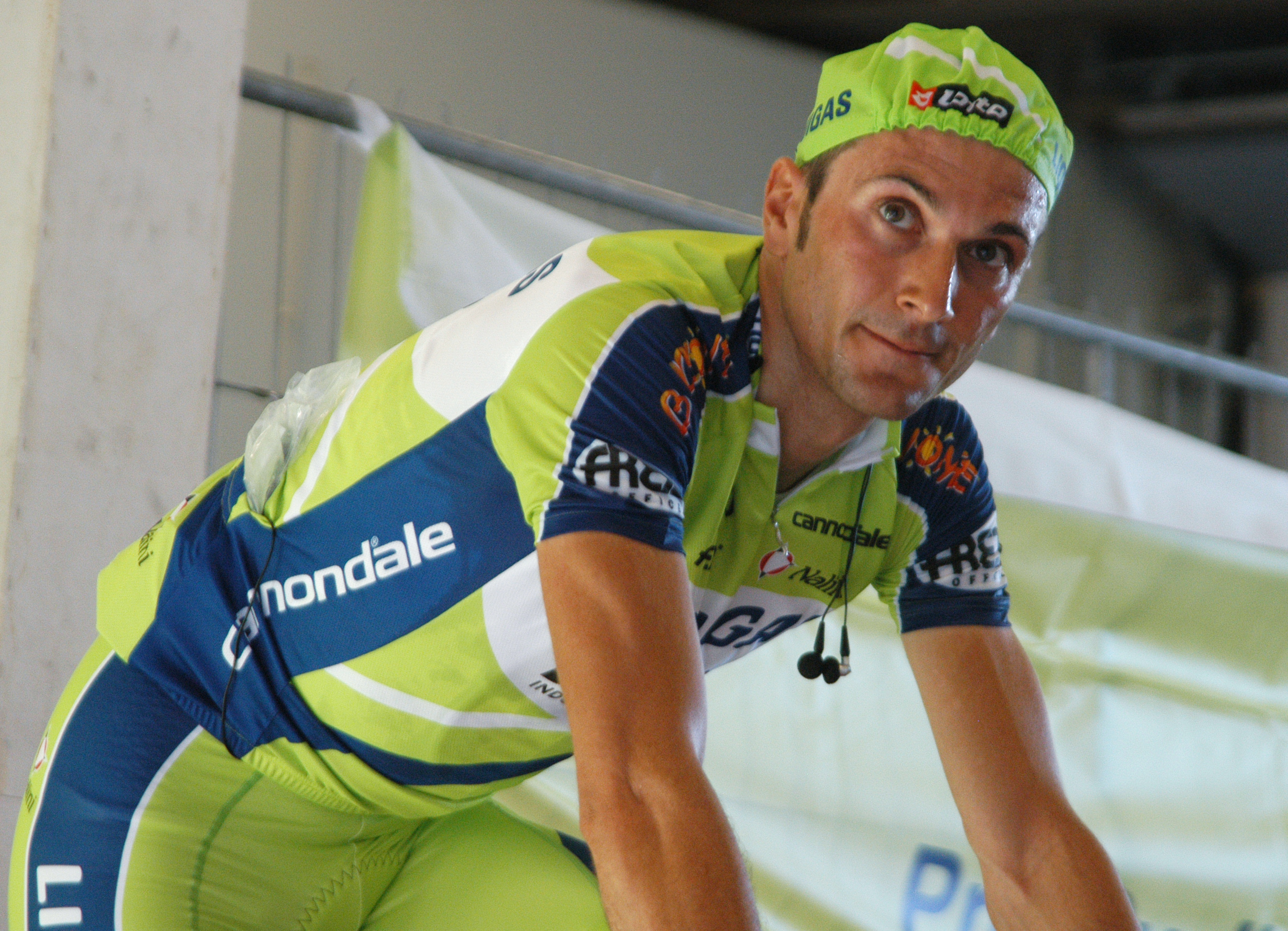
Two-time Giro d'Italia champion Ivan Basso came to Tirreno–Adriatico aiming for overall victory.

Numerous notable riders were present in the race peloton, though their reasons for attending varied slightly. Top stage racers like Cadel Evans, Ivan Basso, Robert Gesink, Vincenzo Nibali, Joaquim Rodríguez, Andy Schleck, and Marco Pinotti were present. Evans' attendance was mainly for racing kilometers before attempting to win the Tour de France. Basso, who likewise planned to peak at the Tour de France, came to the race hoping for overall victory. He named Gesink as a potential rival, and Gesink for his part claimed Basso as a rider he fears. Schleck, Nibali, and Evans were named by one pre-race analysis as possible contenders, but not favorites, due to their plans to be at peak form later in the season.

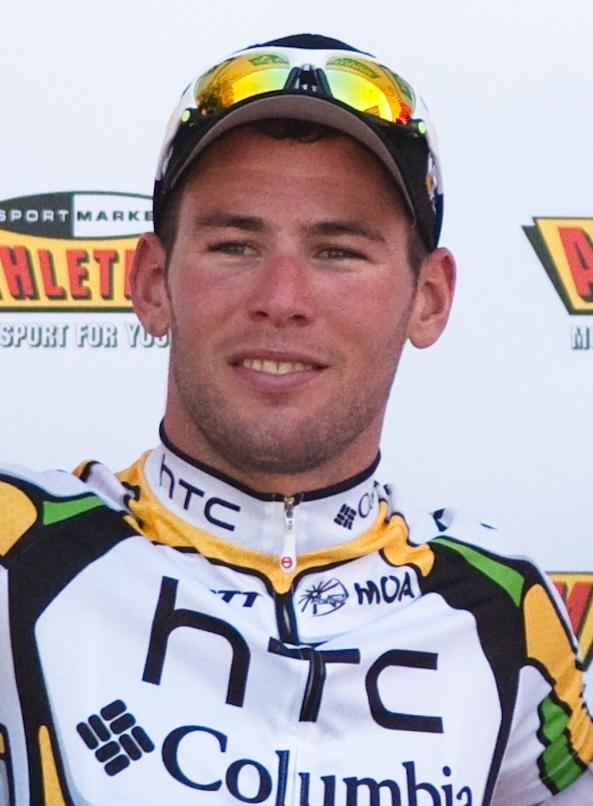
Even though there were only two stages likely to end in mass finishes, sprinters the caliber of Mark Cavendish started Tirreno–Adriatico.

Other riders named as contenders included Philippe Gilbert, Damiano Cunego, Thomas Löfkvist, David Millar, Italian national champion Giovanni Visconti and Edvald Boasson Hagen. 2010's top two, Stefano Garzelli and Michele Scarponi, both returned, but as the race had no time trial in 2010 and had two in 2011, their chances were diminished due to their relatively weak time trial skills. Other notable riders present in the field included 2008 winner Fabian Cancellara, American time trial specialist David Zabriskie, Italian classics rider and former Tirreno–Adriatico podium finisher Alessandro Ballan, former Italian national champion Filippo Pozzato, 2010 Giro d'Italia runner-up David Arroyo, and Australian sprinter Robbie McEwen.

Despite there being only two flat stages (the first two road race days), many top-tier sprinters started the race, as the Tirreno–Adriatico is traditionally considered to be excellent preparation for Milan–San Remo. Every Milan–San Remo winner since Andrei Tchmil in 1999 raced Tirreno–Adriatico (rather than Paris–Nice) beforehand. Tyler Farrar, Tom Boonen, Alessandro Petacchi, André Greipel, world champion Thor Hushovd, the aforementioned McEwen, and the last two Milan–San Remo winners Mark Cavendish and Óscar Freire all started the race.

The stage 1 team time trial was the first in the Tirreno–Adriatico's 46-year history. The individual time trial returned in stage 7, after not being present in 2010. Along with the two flat stages and the two time trials were three hilly stages. While there were no exceptionally high passes visited in the race, each of the hilly stages was long and featured several small, steep ascents. Stages 4 and 5 were both 240 km (150 mi) in length, which is long for stages in a multi-day race. The five road races covered 1,049 km (652 mi) in total.

== Stages ==
=== Stage 1 ===
9 March 2011 – Marina di Carrara, 16.8 km (10.4 mi), team time trial (TTT)

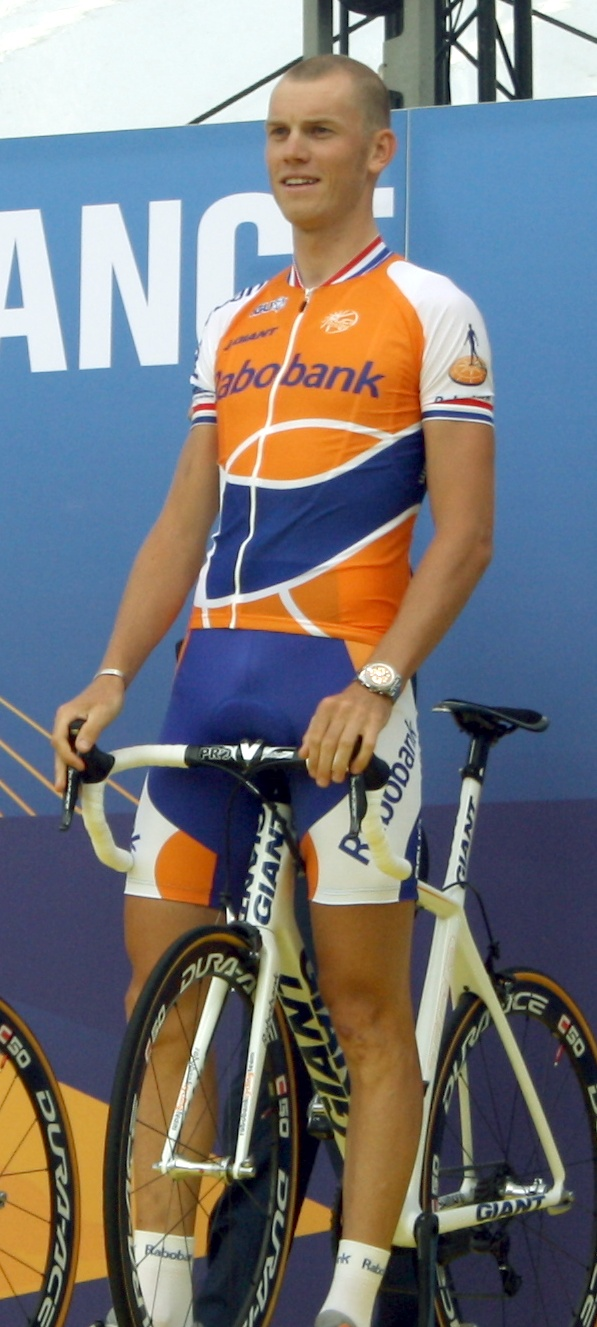
Rabobank's victory in the team time trial meant Lars Boom was the first race leader.

The race of the two seas began with a flat team time trial starting and ending in Marina di Carrara in Tuscany on the Tyrrhenian coast. The course cut inland briefly, but doubled back and ended less than a kilometer from where it started.

The Dutch team Rabobank was the first out of the starthouse, finishing with six of their eight riders in a time of 18' 08". The stage's main favorites took the course later, and each fell short of the time set. Garmin–Cervélo had a slow start, but picked up speed as their ride wore on, finishing second nine seconds slower than Rabobank. HTC–Highroad and Liquigas–Cannondale, winners of the TTT in the respective last two editions of the Giro d'Italia, finished third and fifth at 10 and 22 seconds off Rabobank's time. Omega Pharma–Lotto sprinter André Greipel crashed in the warmups for the TTT and suffered numerous facial injuries. He rode the time trial with several bandages on his head, and abandoned the race before stage 2 with his left eye swollen completely shut.

The Leopard Trek team, driven by world time trial champion Fabian Cancellara, had trouble retaining the minimum of five riders. Tom Stamsnijder fell off the group's pace outside the final kilometer and Cancellara, likely unaware, kept drilling his squad to get them to the line as fast as possible. Their time was not taken until Stamsnijder finished, several seconds after the first four riders, giving them seventh place at 29 seconds back. The squads of Michele Scarponi, Giovanni Visconti, and defending champion Stefano Garzelli all lost considerable time, finishing 37, 55, and 47 seconds off the pace respectively. Lars Boom took the first blue jersey as race leader since he had been the first Rabobank rider to cross the finish line, but more significant was the time in hand the result meant for Robert Gesink against his rivals for the overall classification.

Stage 1 result

	Team	Time
1	Rabobank	18' 08"
2	Garmin–Cervélo	+ 9"
3	HTC–Highroad	+ 10"
4	Saxo Bank–SunGard	+ 11"
5	Liquigas–Cannondale	+ 22"
6	BMC Racing Team	+ 26"
7	Leopard Trek	+ 29"
8	Team RadioShack	+ 30"
9	Team Sky	+ 33"
10	Lampre–ISD	+ 37"

General Classification after Stage 1

	Cyclist	Team	Time
1	Lars Boom (NED)	Rabobank	18' 08"
2	Sebastian Langeveld (NED)	Rabobank	+ 0"
3	Robert Gesink (NED)	Rabobank	+ 0"
4	Bram Tankink (NED)	Rabobank	+ 0"
5	Óscar Freire (ESP)	Rabobank	+ 0"
6	Tom Leezer (NED)	Rabobank	+ 0"
7	Tyler Farrar (USA)	Garmin–Cervélo	+ 9"
8	David Zabriskie (USA)	Garmin–Cervélo	+ 9"
9	Ramūnas Navardauskas (LTU)	Garmin–Cervélo	+ 9"
10	Roger Hammond (GBR)	Garmin–Cervélo	+ 9"

=== Stage 2 ===
10 March 2011 – Carrara to Arezzo, 202 km (126 mi)

The profile for the first road race stage was largely flat, with two small climbs coming about two-thirds of the way in. The course was easterly, heading from the start town of Carrara to the frazione of Indicatore in Arezzo.

Despite the stage being all but certain to end in a field sprint, Javier Aramendia, Leonardo Giordani, and Olivier Kaisen tried their luck with a breakaway after just 3 km (1.9 mi). They were able to increase their advantage by two minutes at one point when the peloton was caught behind a closed railroad crossing, and the race jury decided that the breakaway would not have to stop while the peloton did. When their advantage hit 7'30", the chase, led largely by Team Katusha, began in earnest. Tom Boonen and Mark Cavendish were both gapped off during the chase. Boonen finished 91 seconds back on the day, and though Cavendish did rejoin the leading group, he was not a factor in the sprint finish. The three-man breakaway was caught 44 km (27 mi) from the finish line, leaving Kaisen's teammate Vicente Reynés to try a counter-move, but he was never allowed more than 30 seconds' advantage. A large group sprint indeed took place, won by Tyler Farrar after a strong leadout from world champion Thor Hushovd.

Stage 2 result

	Rider	Team	Time
1	Tyler Farrar (USA)	Garmin–Cervélo	4h 56' 06"
2	Alessandro Petacchi (ITA)	Lampre–ISD	s.t.
3	Juan José Haedo (ARG)	Saxo Bank–SunGard	s.t.
4	Mark Renshaw (AUS)	HTC–Highroad	s.t.
5	Marcel Sieberg (GER)	Omega Pharma–Lotto	s.t.
6	Greg Van Avermaet (BEL)	BMC Racing Team	s.t.
7	Mirco Lorenzetto (ITA)	Astana	s.t.
8	Edvald Boasson Hagen (NOR)	Team Sky	s.t.
9	Borut Božič (SLO)	Vacansoleil–DCM	s.t.
10	Oscar Gatto (ITA)	Farnese Vini–Neri Sottoli	s.t.

General Classification after Stage 2

	Rider	Team	Time
1	Tyler Farrar (USA)	Garmin–Cervélo	5h 14' 13"
2	Tom Leezer (NED)	Rabobank	+ 1"
3	Lars Boom (NED)	Rabobank	+ 1"
4	Sebastian Langeveld (NED)	Rabobank	+ 1"
5	Óscar Freire (ESP)	Rabobank	+ 1"
6	Robert Gesink (NED)	Rabobank	+ 1"
7	Bram Tankink (NED)	Rabobank	+ 1"
8	Juan José Haedo (ARG)	Saxo Bank–SunGard	+ 8"
9	Andreas Klier (GER)	Garmin–Cervélo	+ 10"
10	Roger Hammond (GBR)	Garmin–Cervélo	+ 10"

=== Stage 3 ===
11 March 2011 – Terranuova Bracciolini to Perugia, 189 km (117 mi)

Stage 3 was also flat, heading southeasterly to Perugia in the region of Umbria. A short point-awarding climb occurred 25 km (16 mi) before the finish line.

A lone Euskaltel–Euskadi rider formed the day's breakaway. Daniel Sesma slipped ahead of the peloton after only 2 km (1.2 mi). Given the stage's flat profile and the limited power one rider can muster on his own, he was allowed an advantage of nearly ten minutes at one point, before the chase began. When he was caught, at the 30 km (19 mi) to go mark, the Farnese Vini–Neri Sottoli team took to the front of the field to try to set up an attack by their leader Giovanni Visconti. Visconti never had much of an advantage, but the work done by his team did put sprinters like Mark Cavendish into more difficulty than anticipated on the short climb that preceded the finish. For the second day in a row, Cavendish had to chase back on to the main field prior to the mass sprint finale. In the sprint, world champion Thor Hushovd again led out race leader Tyler Farrar, but may have been too strong in so doing, as he briefly opened up a gap on his team leader. Cavendish lost the wheel of his leadout man Mark Renshaw, and again failed to factor into the finish. Hushovd's early leadout left Farrar to go for the finish line from 600 m (2,000 ft) out, which proved too far as Juan José Haedo was able to come around the American at the last moment and just pip him at the line for the victory. Farrar, however, retained the race leadership for another day.

Stage 3 result

	Rider	Team	Time
1	Juan José Haedo (ARG)	Saxo Bank–SunGard	4h 39' 45"
2	Tyler Farrar (USA)	Garmin–Cervélo	s.t.
3	Daniel Oss (ITA)	Liquigas–Cannondale	s.t.
4	Alessandro Petacchi (ITA)	Lampre–ISD	s.t.
5	Mark Renshaw (AUS)	HTC–Highroad	s.t.
6	Robbie McEwen (AUS)	Team RadioShack	s.t.
7	Lloyd Mondory (FRA)	Ag2r–La Mondiale	s.t.
8	Edvald Boasson Hagen (NOR)	Team Sky	s.t.
9	Marcel Sieberg (GER)	Omega Pharma–Lotto	s.t.
10	Thor Hushovd (NOR)	Garmin–Cervélo	s.t.

General Classification after Stage 3

	Rider	Team	Time
1	Tyler Farrar (USA)	Garmin–Cervélo	9h 53' 51"
2	Juan José Haedo (ARG)	Saxo Bank–SunGard	+ 5"
3	Lars Boom (NED)	Rabobank	+ 6"
4	Óscar Freire (ESP)	Rabobank	+ 8"
5	Tom Leezer (NED)	Rabobank	+ 8"
6	Robert Gesink (NED)	Rabobank	+ 8"
7	Sebastian Langeveld (NED)	Rabobank	+ 8"
8	Bram Tankink (NED)	Rabobank	+ 8"
9	Ramūnas Navardauskas (LTU)	Garmin–Cervélo	+ 15"
10	Andreas Klier (GER)	Garmin–Cervélo	+ 17"

=== Stage 4 ===
12 March 2011 – Narni to Chieti, 240 km (150 mi)

In stage 4, the peloton nearly reached the Adriatic coast, ending in Chieti in Abruzzo just a few kilometers away. The course was hilly, with a climb and a descent early on and several short but steep climbs toward the finish.

The first of two very long stages began with a moment of silence in commemoration of the lives lost in the 2011 Tōhoku earthquake and tsunami, led by Team RadioShack's Fumiyuki Beppu, the only Japanese rider in the race. Beppu's family was safe, and he chose to continue in the race.

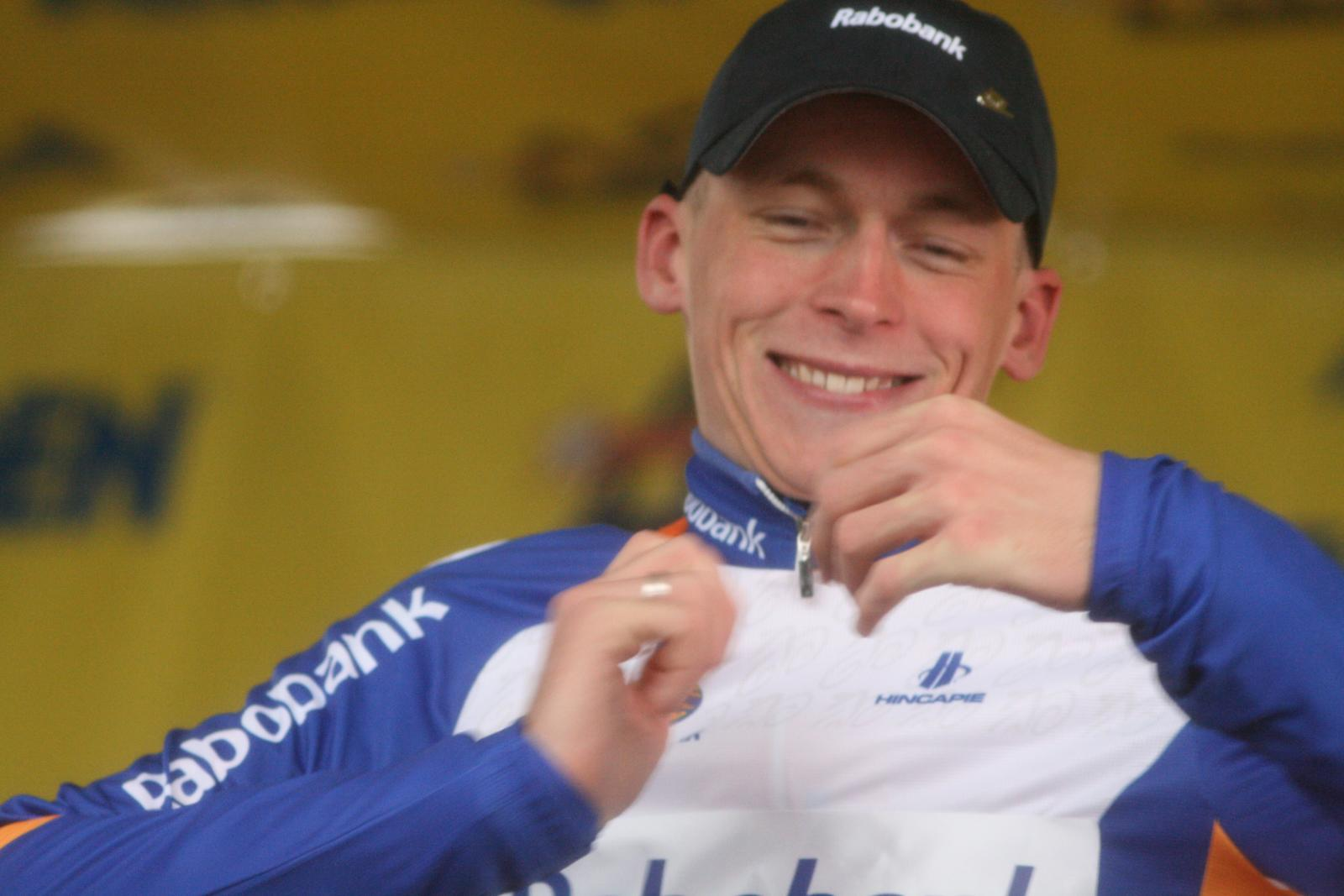
Robert Gesink took the race lead after this stage.

After 25 km (16 mi), a leading trio came clear of the peloton. These were Mikaël Cherel, Gorazd Štangelj, and Sebastian Lang. Their lead exceeded 15 minutes at one point, the most advantage given to a breakaway so far in the race. The mid-course hills took their toll and the leaders' time gap steadily fell as the day went on. Lang was dropped after he punctured and could not chase back on, leaving Cherel and Štangelj alone in front of the race. Their fatigue evident, Cherel tried to ride away from Štangelj with 20 km (12 mi) left to race, but he could not muster much of an attack, and he was brought back 10 km (6.2 mi) later after riding with a very slow cadence and a large gear for those 10 km.

Just before the stage-concluding ascent to the hilltop town of Chieti truly began, world time trial champion Fabian Cancellara, Giovanni Visconti, Dmitriy Muravyev, and world road race champion Thor Hushovd tried a counter-move, but none could keep Cancellara's wheel, so they did not attain a meaningful advantage and were soon brought back. As the climb began, Michele Scarponi, Philippe Gilbert, Danilo Di Luca, and Damiano Cunego went on the attack and gapped off some of their rivals. Ivan Basso and Cadel Evans at first rode more conservatively, but did bridge back up. Scarponi was the strongest of the attackers, quickly surging to the front of the race. Gilbert and then Evans in succession tried to make their way up to him. Cunego marked each move and stayed in their slipstream, so that should the man he was following catch Scarponi, he would be fresher to attack and take victory for his team. Since his teammate was up the road, he did not help either in the chase. Scarponi faded toward the end but held on for victory by a few bike lengths. When it was clear that Scarponi would win the day, Cunego put in a finishing kick to take second place ahead of Evans, giving Lampre–ISD the top two finishers on the day. Scarponi also won in Chieti in the 2010 Tirreno–Adriatico. The gruppetto containing the sprinters, including overnight race leader Tyler Farrar, was 17 minutes back, so there was a new leader after this stage. That was Robert Gesink, still well-placed because of Rabobank's win in the team time trial, but he had had his advantage narrowed by finishing 12 seconds back on this stage.

Stage 4 result

	Rider	Team	Time
1	Michele Scarponi (ITA)	Lampre–ISD	6h 10' 59"
2	Damiano Cunego (ITA)	Lampre–ISD	s.t.
3	Cadel Evans (AUS)	BMC Racing Team	s.t.
4	Ivan Basso (ITA)	Liquigas–Cannondale	+ 2"
5	Danilo Di Luca (ITA)	Team Katusha	+ 6"
6	Robert Gesink (NED)	Rabobank	+ 12"
7	Rinaldo Nocentini (ITA)	Ag2r–La Mondiale	+ 12"
8	Vincenzo Nibali (ITA)	Liquigas–Cannondale	+ 12"
9	Thomas Löfkvist (SWE)	Team Sky	+ 16"
10	Philippe Gilbert (BEL)	Omega Pharma–Lotto	+ 16"

General Classification after Stage 4

	Rider	Team	Time
1	Robert Gesink (NED)	Rabobank	16h 05' 10"
2	Cadel Evans (AUS)	BMC Racing Team	+ 10"
3	Ivan Basso (ITA)	Liquigas–Cannondale	+ 12"
4	Michele Scarponi (ITA)	Lampre–ISD	+ 15"
5	Damiano Cunego (ITA)	Lampre–ISD	+ 19"
6	Sebastian Langeveld (NED)	Rabobank	+ 19"
7	Vincenzo Nibali (ITA)	Liquigas–Cannondale	+ 22"
8	Damiano Caruso (ITA)	Liquigas–Cannondale	+ 34"
9	Thomas Löfkvist (SWE)	Team Sky	+ 37"
10	Peter Velits (SVK)	HTC–Highroad	+ 37"

=== Stage 5 ===
13 March 2011 – Chieti to Castelraimondo, 240 km (150 mi)

The fifth stage included the only climb in the race of over 1,000 m (3,300 ft) in height, the Sasso Tetto cresting at 154 km (96 mi) in. The early part of the route hugged the Adriatic coast before cutting inland for the climbs. The riders saw the finish line twice, taking a 26.6 km (16.5 mi) circuit in Castelraimondo.

Again, the day's principal breakaway was given a large time gap. After 100 km (62 mi), Andrey Amador, Davide Malacarne, Mathew Hayman, Fabian Wegmann and Jens Mouris had a lead of over 11 minutes. The parcours began to take its toll at this point, and as the chase ramped up in the peloton, the time gap fell precipitously. By the time the ascent of the Sasso Tetto began, Mouris was gapped off and lost more and more time as the day went on, eventually finishing 21 minutes behind the stage winner. Hayman and Wegmann kept the pace for a while, and Wegmann won the day's second climb, the Camerino at 201.8 km (125.4 mi), but eventually only Amador and Malacarne were left out front. The second group on the road eventually reduced itself to just a select group of overall favorites and contenders. Amador attacked first on the finishing circuit, but Malacarne made the bridge. Instead of working together to stay away and let a two-up sprint decide the stage winner, Amador and Malacarne sat on one another's wheels and let their rapidly falling advantage dwindle even further. From the elite group of contenders, Pinotti put in an attack on an uphill section of the finishing circuit that effectively gapped off race leader Robert Gesink, who had used up all of his support riders at this point. Gesink finished 17 seconds back on the day, losing the race leadership.

Amador and Malacarne hung on to an advantage of just under two minutes with 10 km (6.2 mi) left to go, meaning they had a chance to stay away. Through a downhill section at 6 km (3.7 mi) to go, their advantage held steady, but the uphill finish was too much for them. They were unaware that Wout Poels had come clear of the elite group of overall favorites and bridged up to them, and the Dutchman was in first position on the road with 200 m (660 ft) to go. But instead of taking the optimal line along the barricades, Poels rode the final meters of the stage in the middle of the road, which gave classics specialist Philippe Gilbert the inside track to pip him at the line for the stage win. Damiano Cunego and Danilo Di Luca also finished at the front of the race, two seconds ahead of the next group. Malacarne's all-day effort in the breakaway did not go unrewarded, as he became the new leader of the mountains classification. Cadel Evans became the new race leader, and he expressed surprise that Gesink had lost it on a day that seemed to suit his strengths.

Stage 5 result

	Rider	Team	Time
1	Philippe Gilbert (BEL)	Omega Pharma–Lotto	6h 43' 23"
2	Wout Poels (NED)	Vacansoleil–DCM	s.t.
3	Damiano Cunego (ITA)	Lampre–ISD	s.t.
4	Danilo Di Luca (ITA)	Team Katusha	s.t.
5	Andrey Amador (CRC)	Movistar Team	s.t.
6	Davide Malacarne (ITA)	Quick-Step	s.t.
7	Tiago Machado (POR)	Team RadioShack	+ 2"
8	Michele Scarponi (ITA)	Lampre–ISD	+ 2"
9	Thomas Löfkvist (SWE)	Team Sky	+ 2"
10	Vincenzo Nibali (ITA)	Liquigas–Cannondale	+ 2"

General Classification after Stage 5

	Rider	Team	Time
1	Cadel Evans (AUS)	BMC Racing Team	22h 48' 45"
2	Ivan Basso (ITA)	Liquigas–Cannondale	+ 2"
3	Damiano Cunego (ITA)	Lampre–ISD	+ 3"
4	Michele Scarponi (ITA)	Lampre–ISD	+ 5"
5	Robert Gesink (NED)	Rabobank	+ 5"
6	Vincenzo Nibali (ITA)	Liquigas–Cannondale	+ 12"
7	Philippe Gilbert (BEL)	Omega Pharma–Lotto	+ 23"
8	Thomas Löfkvist (SWE)	Team Sky	+ 27"
9	Marco Pinotti (ITA)	HTC–Highroad	+ 27"
10	Tiago Machado (POR)	Team RadioShack	+ 32"

=== Stage 6 ===
14 March 2011 – Ussita to Macerata, 178 km (111 mi)

This course was hilly. The riders rode part of the final kilometer in Macerata twice before the actual conclusion of the race, though they only crossed the finish line once. The final kilometer was uphill; the first visit counted as a point-awarding climb and the second was an intermediate sprint.

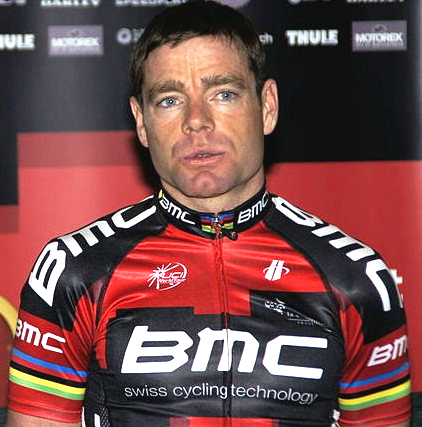
Race leader Cadel Evans won stage 6, giving himself a nearly insurmountable advantage before the final stage.

The first rider to break away for any length of time was Vacansoleil–DCM's Borut Božič, coming clear at the 44 km (27 mi) mark. He was joined shortly thereafter by a bridging Bert Grabsch, and just 6 km (3.7 mi) after Božič's initial escape, the duo had five minutes on the main field. That time gap held steady until the finishing circuits in Macerata began, and the Lampre–ISD team came forward to lead the chase. The lead was two minutes on the hill climb pass at the end of the first circuit but only 20 seconds on the intermediate sprint at the end of the second, and they were caught not long after.

Lampre–ISD continued to work to soften up the field. Przemysław Niemiec was the first, and with only 1.5 km (0.9 mi) left, Damiano Cunego was the last, as their leader Michele Scarponi figured to need to take not only the blue jersey but time in hand over race leader Cadel Evans should he hope to win the race overall, since Evans is the stronger time trialist. On the final ascent, Scarponi and Vincenzo Nibali both got clear of the lead group of overall favorites, but both strangely sat up and stopped riding hard, eying one another, after a turn in the road. This allowed Evans and the other top contenders to catch them. With 200 m (660 ft) to go, Evans hit the front himself, and never gave up first position, holding on for the stage victory. He confirmed after the stage that he had come in simply hoping to retain the race lead, or at least limit any major losses, but when the opportunity to increase that lead presented itself, he took full advantage.

Stage 6 result

	Rider	Team	Time
1	Cadel Evans (AUS)	BMC Racing Team	4h 37' 58"
2	Giovanni Visconti (ITA)	Farnese Vini–Neri Sottoli	s.t.
3	Michele Scarponi (ITA)	Lampre–ISD	s.t.
4	Vincenzo Nibali (ITA)	Liquigas–Cannondale	s.t.
5	Ivan Basso (ITA)	Liquigas–Cannondale	s.t.
6	Wout Poels (NED)	Vacansoleil–DCM	s.t.
7	Stefano Garzelli (ITA)	Acqua & Sapone	s.t.
8	Robert Gesink (NED)	Rabobank	s.t.
9	Philippe Gilbert (BEL)	Omega Pharma–Lotto	s.t.
10	Tiago Machado (POR)	Team RadioShack	s.t.

General Classification after Stage 6

	Rider	Team	Time
1	Cadel Evans (AUS)	BMC Racing Team	27h 26' 33"
2	Michele Scarponi (ITA)	Lampre–ISD	+ 9"
3	Ivan Basso (ITA)	Liquigas–Cannondale	+ 12"
4	Robert Gesink (NED)	Rabobank	+ 15"
5	Vincenzo Nibali (ITA)	Liquigas–Cannondale	+ 21"
6	Damiano Cunego (ITA)	Lampre–ISD	+ 24"
7	Philippe Gilbert (BEL)	Omega Pharma–Lotto	+ 33"
8	Tiago Machado (POR)	Team RadioShack	+ 42"
9	Thomas Löfkvist (SWE)	Team Sky	+ 46"
10	Marco Pinotti (ITA)	HTC–Highroad	+ 46"

=== Stage 7 ===
15 March 2011 – San Benedetto del Tronto, 9.3 km (5.8 mi), individual time trial (ITT)

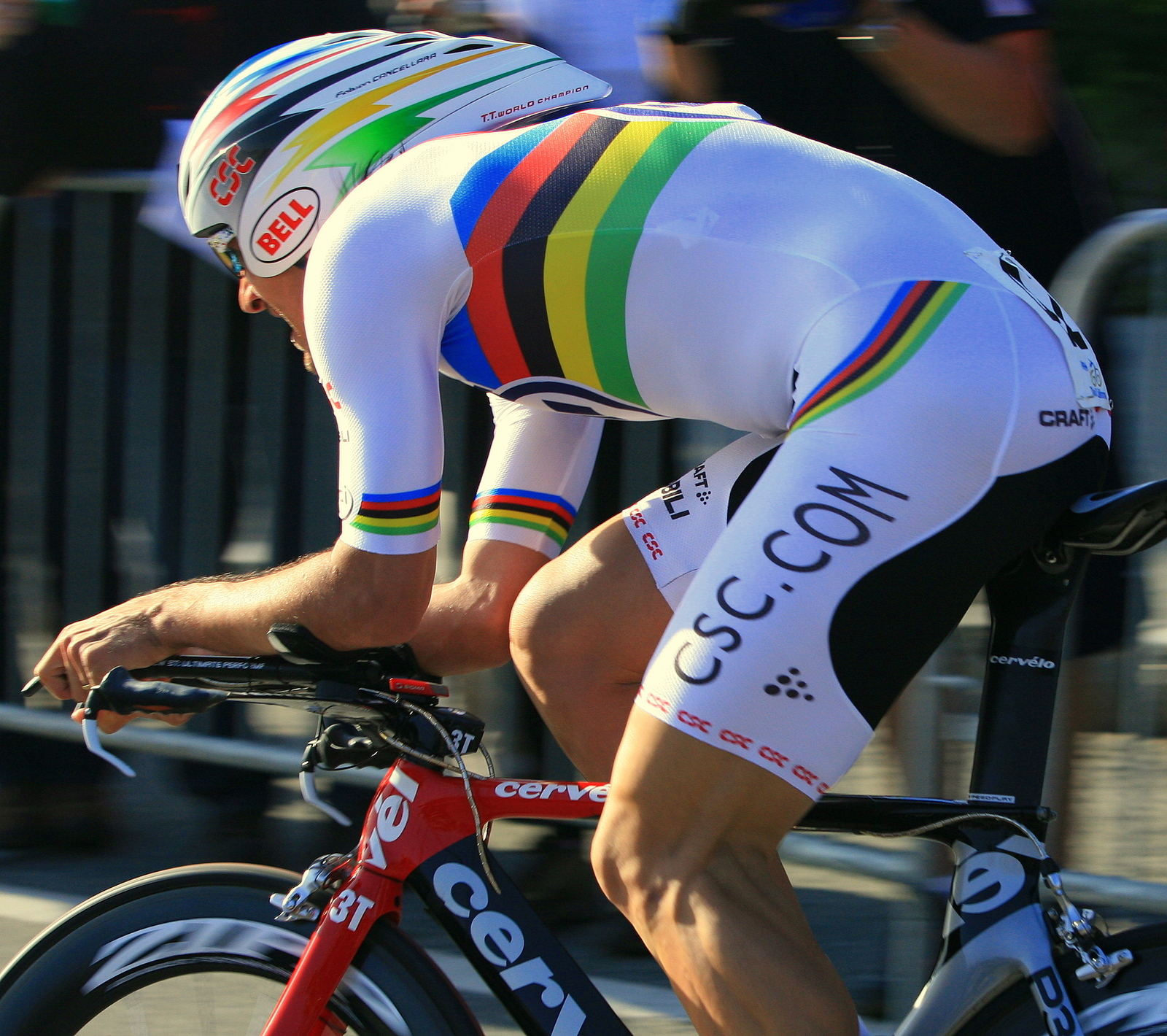
World time trial champion Fabian Cancellara won the final stage individual time trial.

The Tirreno–Adriatico ended as its parent race the Giro d'Italia had for the last three seasons, with an individual time trial. San Benedetto del Tronto in the Marche region played host to a perfectly flat out-and-back ride right along the Adriatic coast.

The winning time came early in the day, from a likely source: four-time world time trial champion Fabian Cancellara stopped the clock in 10'33" about two hours before the race's top overall riders took to the course. Though it did hold up as best, Cancellara said afterward that he was far from certain in his time holding up, considering that he had no reference point. In contrast to the world championships, when he has usually started last as the defending champion and therefore knows the times and splits of his rivals, Cancellara had no such information for this ride. It was Cancellara's first win for Leopard Trek and only the second win overall for the team, after the GP Samyn.

Later, the race's top riders took the course to decide the overall standings. Robert Gesink, generally regarded as a poor time trialist, put up his second very strong individual performance in as many races, after having won the ITT at the Tour of Oman. He finished ninth on the day, 27 seconds back of Cancellara at an even 11 minutes, and successfully moved up to second in the overall standings. Ivan Basso, regarded as solid but unremarkable in the time trial discipline, had a difficult ride, finishing in 11'16" and slipping to fourth overall. Michele Scarponi did him one second better, at 11'15", but fell short of overtaking even Gesink, let alone race leader Cadel Evans, with that time. Italian national champion Marco Pinotti finished sixth both in the time trial and the race overall, coming in at 10'57" on the day. As race leader, Evans was the last man on course, and he clocked in at 11'04", ceding four seconds to Gesink in 12th place on the day, but this was sufficient for him to win the race overall. He knew Vincenzo Nibali's time, which was 11'14", before he began his ride, but not any of the others of his rivals. Evans became the first rider from the southern hemisphere to win Tirreno–Adriatico. Third place finisher Scarponi won the points classification, having taken the jersey from Tyler Farrar after stage 6. Gesink took home the white jersey, having led the youth classification for the entire race. Stage 5 breakaway man Davide Malacarne was the winner of the mountains classification, and Basso and Nibali's Liquigas–Cannondale squad won the team award.

Stage 7 result

	Rider	Team	Time
1	Fabian Cancellara (SUI)	Leopard Trek	10' 33"
2	Lars Boom (NED)	Rabobank	+ 9"
3	Adriano Malori (ITA)	Lampre–ISD	+ 19"
4	Rick Flens (NED)	Rabobank	+ 20"
5	Bert Grabsch (GER)	HTC–Highroad	+ 22"
6	Marco Pinotti (ITA)	HTC–Highroad	+ 24"
7	Sébastien Rosseler (BEL)	Team RadioShack	+ 24"
8	Jonathan Castroviejo (ESP)	Euskaltel–Euskadi	+ 25"
9	Robert Gesink (NED)	Rabobank	+ 27"
10	Nick Nuyens (BEL)	Saxo Bank–SunGard	+ 28"

Final General Classification

	Rider	Team	Time
1	Cadel Evans (AUS)	BMC Racing Team	27h 37' 37"
2	Robert Gesink (NED)	Rabobank	+ 11"
3	Michele Scarponi (ITA)	Lampre–ISD	+ 15"
4	Ivan Basso (ITA)	Liquigas–Cannondale	+ 24"
5	Vincenzo Nibali (ITA)	Liquigas–Cannondale	+ 30"
6	Marco Pinotti (ITA)	HTC–Highroad	+ 39"
7	Tiago Machado (POR)	Team RadioShack	+ 42"
8	Damiano Cunego (ITA)	Lampre–ISD	+ 50"
9	Philippe Gilbert (BEL)	Omega Pharma–Lotto	+ 57"
10	Thomas Löfkvist (SWE)	Team Sky	+ 58"

== Classification leadership table ==
In the Tirreno–Adriatico, four different jerseys were awarded. For the general classification, calculated by adding each cyclist's finishing times on each stage, and allowing time bonuses in intermediate sprints and at the finish in mass-start stages, the leader received a blue jersey. This classification was considered the most important of the Tirreno–Adriatico, and the winner was considered the winner of the race itself.

Additionally, there was a points classification, which awarded a red jersey. In the points classification, cyclists got points for finishing in the top ten in a stage. The stage win awarded 12 points, second place awarded 10 points, third 8, and one point fewer per place down the line, to a single point for tenth. In addition, the first four riders across the intermediate sprint lines earned points, 5, 3, 2, and 1 in succession.

There is also a mountains classification, which awarded a green jersey. In the mountains classifications, points were won by reaching the top of a mountain before other cyclists. There were sixteen recognized climbs in the race. Unlike most other races, the climbs were not separated into categories – each awarded the same points to the first five riders over its summit.

The fourth jersey represented the young rider classification, which awarded a white jersey. This was decided the same way as the general classification, but only riders born after 1 January 1986 are eligible.

Stage	Winner	General Classification	Points Classification	Mountains Classification	Young Riders Classification	Team Classification
1	Rabobank	Lars Boom	no award	no award	Robert Gesink	Rabobank
2	Tyler Farrar	Tyler Farrar	Tyler Farrar	Javier Aramendia	Robert Gesink	Rabobank
3	Juan José Haedo	Tyler Farrar	Tyler Farrar	Javier Aramendia	Robert Gesink	Rabobank
4	Michele Scarponi	Robert Gesink	Tyler Farrar	Javier Aramendia	Robert Gesink	Liquigas–Cannondale
5	Philippe Gilbert	Cadel Evans	Tyler Farrar	Davide Malacarne	Robert Gesink	Liquigas–Cannondale
6	Cadel Evans	Cadel Evans	Michele Scarponi	Davide Malacarne	Robert Gesink	Liquigas–Cannondale
7	Fabian Cancellara	Cadel Evans	Michele Scarponi	Davide Malacarne	Robert Gesink	Liquigas–Cannondale
Final		Cadel Evans	Michele Scarponi	Davide Malacarne	Robert Gesink	Liquigas–Cannondale
