= 2009 Giro dell'Emilia =

2008–2009 UCI Europe Tour

Race details
- Dates: 10 October
- Stages: 1
- Distance: 198.2 km (123.2 mi)
- Winning time: 4h 49' 32"

Results
	Winner	Robert Gesink (NED)	(Rabobank)
	Second	Jakob Fuglsang (DEN)	(Team Saxo Bank)
	Third	Thomas Löfkvist (SWE)	(Team Columbia–HTC)

The 2009 Giro dell'Emilia was the 92nd edition of this single day road bicycle racing.

== Results ==
	Cyclist	Team	Time
1	Robert Gesink (NED)	Rabobank	4h 49' 32"
2	Jakob Fuglsang (DEN)	Team Saxo Bank	s.t.
3	Thomas Löfkvist (SWE)	Team Columbia–HTC	s.t.
4	Cadel Evans (AUS)	Silence–Lotto	+ 20"
5	Alexander Vinokourov (KAZ)	Astana	+ 30"
6	Fredrik Kessiakoff (SWE)	Fuji–Servetto	+ 32"
7	Alexandr Kolobnev (RUS)	Team Saxo Bank	+ 40"
8	Chris Anker Sørensen (DEN)	Team Saxo Bank	+ 43"
9	Alberto Fernández de la Puebla (ESP)	Fuji–Servetto	s.t.
10	Paolo Tiralongo (ITA)	Lampre–NGC	+ 50"
11	Mauricio Soler (COL)	Barloworld	+ 53"
12	Domenico Pozzovivo (ITA)	CSF Group–Navigare	+ 1' 00"
13	Bartosz Huzarski (POL)	ISD–NERI	s.t.
14	Damiano Cunego (ITA)	Lampre–NGC	+ 1' 03"
15	Leonardo Bertagnolli (ITA)	Diquigiovanni–Androni	s.t.
