= 2010 Giro dell'Emilia =

UCI Europe Tour

Race details
- Dates: 9 October
- Stages: 1
- Winning time: 4h 49' 14"

Results
	Winner	Robert Gesink (NED)	(Rabobank)
	Second	Dan Martin (IRL)	(Garmin–Transitions)
	Third	Michele Scarponi (ITA)	(Androni Giocattoli)

The 2010 Giro dell'Emilia was the 93rd edition of this single day road bicycle racing. The number 1 jersey was worn by Robert Gesink who won the previous edition.

== Teams ==
Twenty four teams were invited to the 2010 Giro dell'Emilia.

Teams from the UCI Pro Tour

- Rabobank
- Astana
- Liquigas–Doimo
- Lampre–Farnese Vini
- Team Katusha
- Team HTC–Columbia
- Omega Pharma–Lotto
- Footon–Servetto–Fuji
- Team Saxo Bank
- Ag2r–La Mondiale
- Garmin–Transitions
- Quick-Step

UCI Professional Continental and Continental teams invited here

- Carmiooro NGC
- Saur–Sojasun
- ISD–NERI
- De Rosa–Stac Plastic
- Androni Giocattoli
- Acqua & Sapone
- Ceramica Flaminia
- Colnago–CSF Inox
- Cervélo TestTeam
- Vacansoleil
- Miche
- CDC–Cavaliere

== Results ==
	Cyclist	Team	Time
1	Robert Gesink (NED)	Rabobank	4h 49' 14"
2	Dan Martin (IRL)	Garmin–Transitions	+ 1"
3	Michele Scarponi (ITA)	Androni Giocattoli	+ 1"
4	Alexandr Kolobnev (RUS)	Team Katusha	+ 11"
5	Vincenzo Nibali (ITA)	Liquigas–Doimo	+ 13"
6	Domenico Pozzovivo (ITA)	Colnago–CSF Inox	+ 16"
7	Jérôme Coppel (FRA)	Saur–Sojasun	+ 24"
8	Xavier Tondó (ESP)	Cervélo TestTeam	+ 40"
9	Riccardo Riccò (ITA)	Vacansoleil	+ 50"
10	Patrik Sinkewitz (GER)	ISD–NERI	+ 54"
