= 2009 Giro di Lombardia =

2009 UCI World Ranking, race 24 of 24

Race details
- Dates: 17 October 2009
- Stages: 1
- Distance: 242 km (150 mi)

Results
	Winner	Philippe Gilbert (BEL)	(Silence–Lotto)
	Second	Samuel Sánchez (ESP)	(Euskaltel–Euskadi)
	Third	Alexandr Kolobnev (RUS)	(Team Saxo Bank)

The 2009 Giro di Lombardia was the 103rd edition of this single day road bicycle racing monument race, colloquially known as the "Race of the Falling Leaves". The event was run on 17 October 2009. It was the final event of the 2009 UCI World Ranking and the final major event of the 2009 road racing season. For the third consecutive year, the race was 242 kilometres long and depart from Varese to its finish in Como.

Notable features of this race include the fact that it is run around picturesque Lake Como in Northern Italy and includes the Madonna del Ghisallo climb (511m of elevation gain). At the top of this climb sits the shrine of Madonna del Ghisallo (the patron saint of cyclists) that contains a large amount of cycling memorabilia.

== General standings ==
17 October 2009, 242 km

	Cyclist	Team	Time
1	Philippe Gilbert (BEL)	Silence–Lotto	5h 43' 46"
2	Samuel Sánchez (ESP)	Euskaltel–Euskadi	s.t.
3	Alexandr Kolobnev (RUS)	Team Saxo Bank	+ 4"
4	Luca Paolini (ITA)	Acqua & Sapone–Caffè Mokambo	+ 5"
5	Johnny Hoogerland (NED)	Vacansoleil	s.t.
6	Robert Gesink (NED)	Rabobank	s.t.
7	Alexander Vinokourov (KAZ)	Astana	s.t.
8	Dan Martin (IRL)	Garmin–Slipstream	s.t.
9	Juan José Cobo (ESP)	Fuji–Servetto	s.t.
10	Cadel Evans (AUS)	Silence–Lotto	s.t.
