= 2013 Brabantse Pijl =

Race details
- Dates: 10 April 2013
- Stages: 1
- Distance: 200 km (124.3 mi)
- Winning time: 4h 45' 06"

Results
	Winner	Peter Sagan (SVK)
	Second	Philippe Gilbert (BEL)
	Third	Björn Leukemans (BEL)

The 2013 Brabantse Pijl was the 53rd edition of the Brabantse Pijl cycle race and was held on 10 April 2013. The race started in Leuven and finished in Overijse. The race was won by Peter Sagan.

== General classification ==
Final general classification

Rank	Rider	Time
1	Peter Sagan (SVK)	4h 45' 06"
2	Philippe Gilbert (BEL)	+ 0"
3	Björn Leukemans (BEL)	+ 4"
4	Sylvain Chavanel (FRA)	+ 9"
5	Simon Geschke (GER)	+ 9"
6	Greg Van Avermaet (BEL)	+ 11"
7	Davide Malacarne (ITA)	+ 17"
8	Stijn Devolder (BEL)	+ 19"
9	Paul Voss (GER)	+ 22"
10	Kenny Dehaes (BEL)	+ 25"
