= 2013 Strade Bianche =

2013 UCI Europe Tour

Race details
- Dates: March 2
- Stages: 1
- Distance: 188 km (117 mi)
- Winning time: 5h 01' 53"

Results
	Winner	Moreno Moser (ITA)	(Cannondale)
	Second	Peter Sagan (SVK)	(Cannondale)
	Third	Rinaldo Nocentini (ITA)	(Ag2r–La Mondiale)

The 2013 Strade Bianche was the 7th edition of the international one-day cycling race Strade Bianche. The race was held on 2 March 2013, on the same route of the previous edition. The race started in Gaiole del Chianti and ended in Piazza del Campo in Siena.

The race was won by Cannondale's rider Moreno Moser, the nephew of Francesco Moser. His team-mate Peter Sagan was second and Rinaldo Nocentini of Ag2r–La Mondiale was third. Moser attacked together with Juan Antonio Flecha with 17 km to go, chased down the four fugitives Michael Schär, Maxim Belkov, Giairo Ermeti and Aleksejs Saramotins, and attacked again for a solo breakaway on the final climb in the last kilometer.

== Teams ==
The start list includes 17 teams – 11 ProTeams and 6 Professional Continental Teams – and a total of 136 riders. Among them were the 2012 winner Fabian Cancellara (RadioShack–Leopard), Cannondale talents Peter Sagan and Moreno Moser, the 2006 Milan – San Remo winner Filippo Pozzato of Lampre–Merida, the 2011 Tour de France winner Cadel Evans (BMC Racing Team) and the 2009 Vuelta a España winner Alejandro Valverde of the Movistar Team.

- Ag2r–La Mondiale
- Androni Giocattoli–Venezuela
- Astana
- Bardiani Valvole–CSF Inox
- Blanco Pro Cycling
- BMC Racing Team
- Cannondale
- Crelan–Euphony
- Garmin–Sharp
- IAM Cycling
- Team Katusha
- Lampre–Merida
- Movistar Team
- RadioShack–Leopard
- Argos–Shimano
- Vacansoleil–DCM
- Vini Fantini–Selle Italia

== Results ==
	Cyclist	Team	Time
1	Moreno Moser (ITA)	Cannondale	5h 01' 53"
2	Peter Sagan (SVK)	Cannondale	+ 6"
3	Rinaldo Nocentini (ITA)	Ag2r–La Mondiale	+ 7"
4	Fabian Cancellara (SUI)	RadioShack–Leopard	+ 7"
5	Aleksejs Saramotins (LAT)	IAM Cycling	+ 7"
6	Greg Van Avermaet (BEL)	BMC Racing Team	+ 7"
7	Alexandr Kolobnev (RUS)	Team Katusha	+ 7"
8	Francesco Reda (ITA)	Androni Giocattoli–Venezuela	+ 7"
9	Giampaolo Caruso (ITA)	Team Katusha	+ 10"
10	Maxim Belkov (RUS)	Team Katusha	+ 13"
