= 2011 Tour of Oman =

Race details
- Dates: 15–20 February
- Stages: 6
- Distance: 838 km (520.7 mi)
- Winning time: 20h 24' 36"

Results
| Jersey awarded to the overall winner | Winner | Robert Gesink (NED) | (Rabobank) |
| | Second | Edvald Boasson Hagen (NOR) | (Team Sky) |
| | Third | Giovanni Visconti (ITA) | (Farnese Vini–Neri Sottoli) |
| Jersey awarded to the points classification winner | Points | Edvald Boasson Hagen (NOR) | (Team Sky) |
| Jersey awarded to the youth classification winner | Youth | Robert Gesink (NED) | (Rabobank) |
| | Team | Leopard Trek | |

The 2011 Tour of Oman is the second edition of the Tour of Oman cycling stage race. It is rated as a 2.1 event on the UCI Asia Tour, and held from 15 February to 20 February 2011, in Oman.

== Teams ==
Sixteen teams will compete in the 2011 Tour of Oman. These will include ten UCI ProTour teams, five UCI Professional Continental teams, and one Continental team. The teams participating in the race are:

- Team Katusha
- Astana
- Leopard Trek
- Garmin–Cervélo
- Team Sky
- Geox–TMC
- Rabobank
- Quick-Step
- Farnese Vini–Neri Sottoli
- HTC–Highroad
- FDJ
- BMC Racing Team
- Skil–Shimano
- Lampre–ISD
- Topsport Vlaanderen–Mercator
- An Post–Sean Kelly

== Stages ==
=== Stage 1 ===
15 February 2011 - Al Sawadi to Al Seeb, 158 km (98.2 mi)

Stage 1 Results

| | Rider | Team | Time |
|---|---|---|---|
| 1 | Theo Bos (NED) | Rabobank | 3h 38' 29" |
| 2 | Mark Cavendish (GBR) | HTC–Highroad | st. |
| 3 | Roger Kluge (GER) | Skil–Shimano | st. |
| 4 | Edvald Boasson Hagen (NOR) | Team Sky | st. |
| 5 | Denis Galimzyanov (RUS) | Team Katusha | st. |
| 6 | Nacer Bouhanni (FRA) | FDJ | st. |
| 7 | Danilo Hondo (GER) | Lampre–ISD | st. |
| 8 | Russell Downing (GBR) | Team Sky | st. |
| 9 | Francesco Chicchi (ITA) | Quick-Step | st. |
| 10 | Mathew Hayman (AUS) | Team Sky | st. |

General Classification after Stage 1

| | Cyclist | Team | Time |
|---|---|---|---|
| 1 | Theo Bos (NED) | Rabobank | 3h 38′ 19″ |
| 2 | Mark Cavendish (GBR) | HTC–Highroad | + 4" |
| 3 | Pieter Serry (BEL) | Topsport Vlaanderen–Mercator | + 4" |
| 4 | Roger Kluge (GER) | Skil–Shimano | + 6" |
| 5 | Mark McNally (GBR) | An Post–Sean Kelly | + 7" |
| 6 | Tanel Kangert (EST) | Astana | + 7" |
| 7 | Edvald Boasson Hagen (NOR) | Team Sky | + 10" |
| 8 | Denis Galimzyanov (RUS) | Team Katusha | + 10" |
| 9 | Nacer Bouhanni (FRA) | FDJ | + 10" |
| 10 | Danilo Hondo (GER) | Lampre–ISD | + 10" |

=== Stage 2 ===
16 February 2011 - The Wave, Muscat to Al Wutayya, 139 km (86.4 mi)

Stage 2 Results

| | Rider | Team | Time |
|---|---|---|---|
| 1 | Matthew Goss (AUS) | HTC–Highroad | 3h 18' 17" |
| 2 | Daniele Bennati (ITA) | Leopard Trek | st. |
| 3 | Edvald Boasson Hagen (NOR) | Team Sky | st. |
| 4 | Greg Van Avermaet (BEL) | BMC Racing Team | st. |
| 5 | Danilo Hondo (GER) | Lampre–ISD | st. |
| 6 | Oscar Gatto (ITA) | Farnese Vini–Neri Sottoli | st. |
| 7 | Luca Paolini (ITA) | Team Katusha | st. |
| 8 | Lars Boom (NED) | Rabobank | st. |
| 9 | Simon Clarke (AUS) | Astana | + 3" |
| 10 | Grega Bole (SLO) | Lampre–ISD | + 3" |

General Classification after Stage 2

| | Cyclist | Team | Time |
|---|---|---|---|
| 1 | Matthew Goss (AUS) | HTC–Highroad | 6h 56′ 36″ |
| 2 | Daniele Bennati (ITA) | Liquigas–Cannondale | + 4" |
| 3 | Edvald Boasson Hagen (NOR) | Team Sky | + 6" |
| 4 | Pieter Serry (BEL) | Topsport Vlaanderen–Mercator | + 7" |
| 5 | Tanel Kangert (EST) | Astana | + 9" |
| 6 | Danilo Hondo (GER) | Lampre–ISD | + 10" |
| 7 | Luca Paolini (ITA) | Team Katusha | + 10" |
| 8 | Greg Van Avermaet (BEL) | BMC Racing Team | + 10" |
| 9 | Lars Boom (NED) | Rabobank | + 10" |
| 10 | Patrik Sinkewitz (GER) | Farnese Vini–Neri Sottoli | + 10" |

=== Stage 3 ===
17 February 2011 - Sur to Sur, 208 km (129.2 mi)

Stage 3 Results

| | Rider | Team | Time |
|---|---|---|---|
| 1 | Theo Bos (NED) | Rabobank | 5h 14' 41" |
| 2 | Daniele Bennati (ITA) | Leopard Trek | st. |
| 3 | Matthew Goss (AUS) | HTC–Highroad | st. |
| 4 | Edvald Boasson Hagen (NOR) | Team Sky | st. |
| 5 | Heinrich Haussler (AUS) | Garmin–Cervélo | st. |
| 6 | Oscar Gatto (ITA) | Farnese Vini–Neri Sottoli | st. |
| 7 | Denis Galimzyanov (RUS) | Team Katusha | st. |
| 8 | Niko Eeckhout (BEL) | An Post–Sean Kelly | st. |
| 9 | Mark Cavendish (GBR) | HTC–Highroad | st. |
| 10 | Francesco Chicchi (ITA) | Quick-Step | st. |

General Classification after Stage 3

| | Cyclist | Team | Time |
|---|---|---|---|
| 1 | Matthew Goss (AUS) | HTC–Highroad | 12h 11′ 13″ |
| 2 | Daniele Bennati (ITA) | Liquigas–Cannondale | + 2" |
| 3 | Edvald Boasson Hagen (NOR) | Team Sky | + 10" |
| 4 | Pieter Serry (BEL) | Topsport Vlaanderen–Mercator | + 11" |
| 5 | Patrik Sinkewitz (GER) | Farnese Vini–Neri Sottoli | + 11" |
| 6 | Marko Kump (SLO) | Geox–TMC | + 11" |
| 7 | Tanel Kangert (EST) | Astana | + 13" |
| 8 | Danilo Hondo (GER) | Lampre–ISD | + 14" |
| 9 | Greg Van Avermaet (BEL) | BMC Racing Team | + 14" |
| 10 | Luca Paolini (ITA) | Team Katusha | + 14" |

=== Stage 4 ===
18 February 2011 - Sultan to Jebel Al Akhdhar, 157 km (97.6 mi)

Stage 4 Results

| | Rider | Team | Time |
|---|---|---|---|
| 1 | Robert Gesink (NED) | Rabobank | 4h 03' 58" |
| 2 | Edvald Boasson Hagen (NOR) | Team Sky | +47" |
| 3 | Dries Devenyns (BEL) | Quick-Step | +51" |
| 4 | Giovanni Visconti (ITA) | Farnese Vini–Neri Sottoli | +53" |
| 5 | Christian Vande Velde (USA) | Garmin–Cervélo | +53" |
| 6 | Greg Van Avermaet (BEL) | BMC Racing Team | +1' 02" |
| 7 | Maxime Monfort (BEL) | Leopard Trek | +1' 02" |
| 8 | Michael Albasini (ITA) | HTC–Highroad | +1' 02" |
| 9 | Juan Antonio Flecha (ESP) | Team Sky | +1' 12" |
| 10 | Patrik Sinkewitz (GER) | Farnese Vini–Neri Sottoli | +1' 29" |

General Classification after Stage 4

| | Cyclist | Team | Time |
|---|---|---|---|
| 1 | Robert Gesink (NED) | Rabobank | 16h 15' 28" |
| 2 | Edvald Boasson Hagen (NOR) | Team Sky | +44" |
| 3 | Dries Devenyns (BEL) | Quick-Step | +57" |
| 4 | Giovanni Visconti (ITA) | Farnese Vini–Neri Sottoli | +1' 03" |
| 5 | Christian Vande Velde (USA) | Garmin–Cervélo | +1' 03" |
| 6 | Greg Van Avermaet (BEL) | BMC Racing Team | +1' 09" |
| 7 | Maxime Monfort (BEL) | Leopard Trek | +1' 15" |
| 8 | Michael Albasini (ITA) | HTC–Highroad | +1' 15" |
| 9 | Juan Antonio Flecha (ESP) | Team Sky | +1' 22" |
| 10 | Patrik Sinkewitz (GER) | Farnese Vini–Neri Sottoli | +1' 33" |

=== Stage 5 ===
19 February 2011 - Al Jissah (ITT), 18.5 km (11.5 mi)

Stage 5 Results

| | Rider | Team | Time |
|---|---|---|---|
| 1 | Robert Gesink (NED) | Rabobank | 29' 21" |
| 2 | Giovanni Visconti (ITA) | Farnese Vini–Neri Sottoli | +16" |
| 3 | Marco Pinotti (ITA) | HTC–Highroad | +24" |
| 4 | Fabian Cancellara (SWI) | Leopard Trek | +27" |
| 5 | Edvald Boasson Hagen (NOR) | Team Sky | +29" |
| 6 | Adriano Malori (ITA) | Lampre–ISD | +36" |
| 7 | Michael Albasini (SWI) | HTC–Highroad | +37" |
| 8 | Lars Boom (NED) | Rabobank | +43" |
| 9 | Arnold Jeannesson (FRA) | FDJ | +59" |
| 10 | Christian Vande Velde (USA) | Garmin–Cervélo | +1' 01" |

General Classification after Stage 5

| | Cyclist | Team | Time |
|---|---|---|---|
| 1 | Robert Gesink (NED) | Rabobank | 16h 44' 38" |
| 2 | Edvald Boasson Hagen (NOR) | Team Sky | +1' 13" |
| 3 | Giovanni Visconti (ITA) | Farnese Vini–Neri Sottoli | +1' 19" |
| 4 | Michael Albasini (SWI) | HTC–Highroad | +1' 52" |
| 5 | Christian Vande Velde (USA) | Garmin–Cervélo | +2' 04" |
| 6 | Fabian Cancellara (SWI) | Leopard Trek | +2' 11" |
| 7 | Dries Devenyns (BEL) | Quick-Step | +2' 13" |
| 8 | Maxime Monfort (BEL) | HTC–Highroad | +2' 19" |
| 9 | Patrik Sinkewitz (GER) | Farnese Vini–Neri Sottoli | +2' 51" |
| 10 | Greg Van Avermaet (BEL) | BMC Racing Team | +3' 02" |

=== Stage 6 ===
20 February 2011 - Qurayyat to Mattrah Seafront, 157 km (97.6 mi)

Stage 6 Results

| | Rider | Team | Time |
|---|---|---|---|
| 1 | Mark Cavendish (GBR) | HTC–Highroad | 3h 39' 58" |
| 2 | Denis Galimzyanov (RUS) | Team Katusha | s.t. |
| 3 | Andrea Guardini (ITA) | Farnese Vini–Neri Sottoli | s.t. |
| 4 | Matteo Pelucchi (ITA) | Geox–TMC | s.t. |
| 5 | Francesco Chicchi (ITA) | Quick-Step | s.t. |
| 6 | Thor Hushovd (NOR) | Garmin–Cervélo | s.t. |
| 7 | Pieter Ghyllebert (BEL) | An Post–Sean Kelly | s.t. |
| 8 | Nacer Bouhanni (FRA) | FDJ | s.t. |
| 9 | Stijn Neirynck (BEL) | Topsport Vlaanderen–Mercator | s.t. |
| 10 | Theo Bos (NED) | Rabobank | s.t. |

General Classification after Stage 6

| | Cyclist | Team | Time |
|---|---|---|---|
| 1 | Robert Gesink (NED) | Rabobank | 20h 24' 36" |
| 2 | Edvald Boasson Hagen (NOR) | Team Sky | +1' 13" |
| 3 | Giovanni Visconti (ITA) | Farnese Vini–Neri Sottoli | +1' 19" |
| 4 | Michael Albasini (SWI) | HTC–Highroad | +1' 52" |
| 5 | Christian Vande Velde (USA) | Garmin–Cervélo | +2' 04" |
| 6 | Fabian Cancellara (SWI) | Leopard Trek | +2' 11" |
| 7 | Dries Devenyns (BEL) | Quick-Step | +2' 13" |
| 8 | Maxime Monfort (BEL) | Leopard Trek | +2' 19" |
| 9 | Patrik Sinkewitz (GER) | Farnese Vini–Neri Sottoli | +2' 51" |
| 10 | Juan Antonio Flecha (ESP) | Team Sky | +3' 03" |

== Classification Leadership ==
| Stage | Winner | General Classification | Points Classification | Young Rider Classification | Combative Cyclist Classification | Teams Classification |
|---|---|---|---|---|---|---|
| 1 | Theo Bos | Theo Bos | Theo Bos | Roger Kluge | Pieter Serry | Team Sky |
| 2 | Matthew Goss | Matthew Goss | Edvald Boasson Hagen | Matthew Goss | Pieter Serry | Team Sky |
| 3 | Theo Bos | Matthew Goss | Theo Bos | Matthew Goss | Pieter Serry | Team Sky |
| 4 | Robert Gesink | Robert Gesink | Edvald Boasson Hagen | Robert Gesink | Marko Kump | Leopard Trek |
| 5 | Robert Gesink | Robert Gesink | Edvald Boasson Hagen | Robert Gesink | Marko Kump | Leopard Trek |
| 6 | Mark Cavendish | Robert Gesink | Edvald Boasson Hagen | Robert Gesink | Marko Kump | Leopard Trek |
| Final | | Robert Gesink | Edvald Boasson Hagen | Robert Gesink | Marko Kump | Leopard Trek |
