= 2013 Grand Prix Cycliste de Québec =

2013 UCI World Tour, race 25 of 28

Race details
- Dates: 13 September 2012
- Stages: 1
- Distance: 201.6 km (125.3 mi)
- Winning time: 4h 58' 13"

Results
	Winner	Robert Gesink (NED)	(Belkin Pro Cycling)
	Second	Arthur Vichot (FRA)	(FDJ.fr)
	Third	Greg Van Avermaet (BEL)	(BMC Racing Team)

The 2013 Grand Prix Cycliste de Québec was the fourth edition of the Grand Prix Cycliste de Québec, a single-day professional bicycle road race. It was held on 13 September 2013, over a distance of 201.6 km (125.3 mi), starting and finishing in Quebec City. It was the 25th event of the 2013 UCI World Tour season. The race is one of the only two events which are part of the World Tour calendar in North America, the other one being the 2013 Grand Prix Cycliste de Montréal contested two days later.

== Teams ==
As the Grand Prix Cycliste de Québec was a UCI World Tour event, all 19 UCI ProTeams were invited automatically and obligated to send a squad. There was also one wildcard invitations, which was Team Europcar. A Canadian national squad also competed in the race, and as such, formed the event's 21-team peloton.

The 21 teams that competed in the race were:

- Ag2r–La Mondiale
- Astana
- Belkin Pro Cycling
- BMC Racing Team
- Canada (national team) †
- Cannondale
- Euskaltel–Euskadi
- FDJ.fr
- Garmin–Sharp
- Team Katusha
- Lampre–Merida
- Lotto–Belisol
- Movistar Team
- Omega Pharma–Quick-Step
- Orica–GreenEDGE
- RadioShack–Leopard
- Team Europcar †
- Saxo–Tinkoff
- Team Sky
- Vacansoleil–DCM

== Results ==
	Cyclist	Team	Time	UCI World Tour Points
1	Robert Gesink (NED)	Belkin Pro Cycling	4h 58' 13"	80
2	Arthur Vichot (FRA)	FDJ.fr	s.t.	60
3	Greg Van Avermaet (BEL)	BMC Racing Team	s.t.	50
4	Fabian Wegmann (GER)	Garmin–Sharp	s.t.	40
5	Rui Costa (POR)	Movistar Team	s.t.	30
6	Niki Terpstra (NED)	Omega Pharma–Quick-Step	s.t.	22
7	Tom-Jelte Slagter (NED)	Belkin Pro Cycling	s.t.	14
8	Matti Breschel (DEN)	Saxo–Tinkoff	s.t.	10
9	Simon Geschke (GER)	Argos–Shimano	+ 4"	6
10	Peter Sagan (SVK)	Cannondale	+ 6"	2
