= 2013 Grand Prix Cycliste de Montréal =

2013 UCI World Tour, race 26 of 28
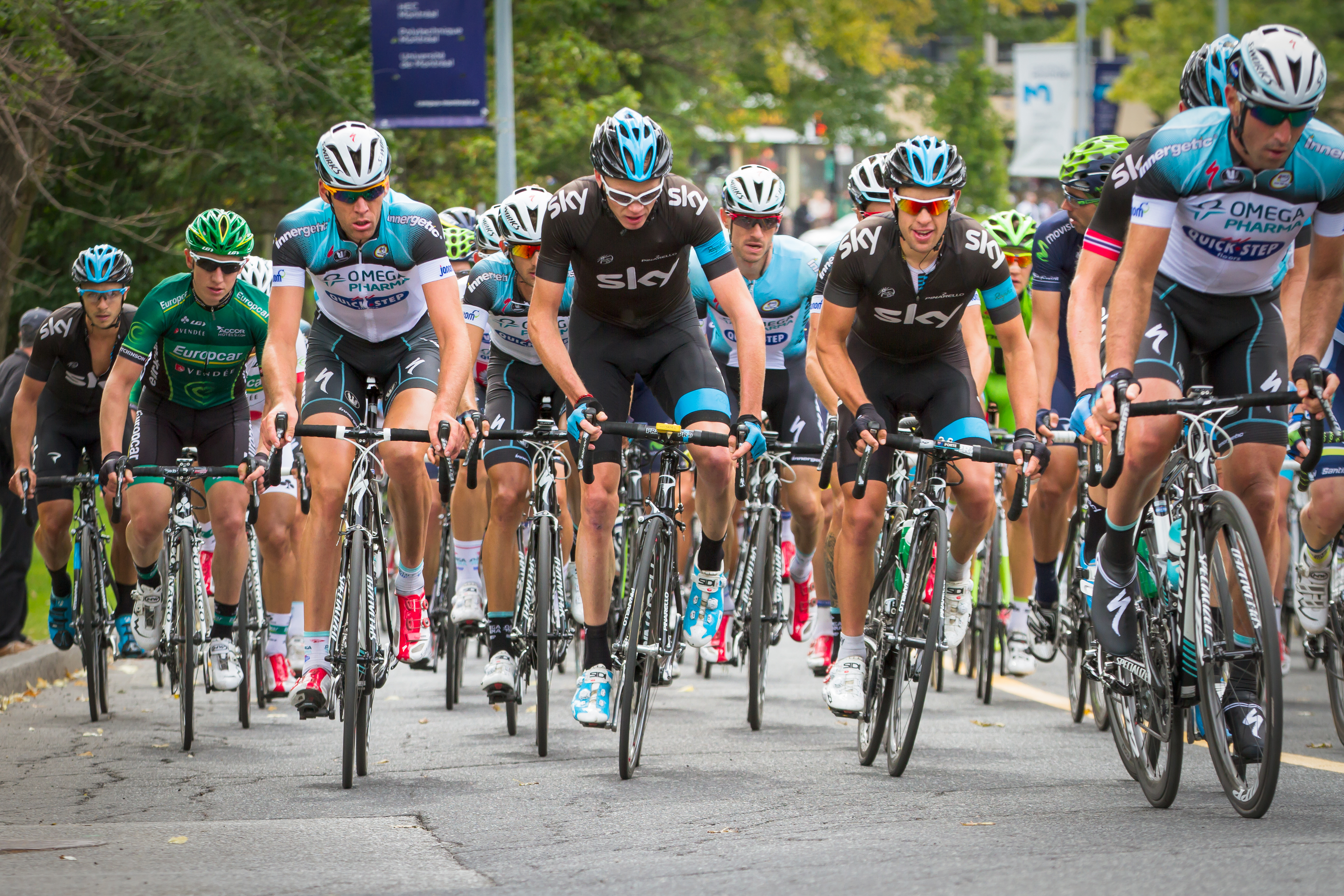

Race details
- Dates: 15 September 2013
- Stages: 1
- Distance: 205.7 km (127.8 mi)
- Winning time: 5h 20' 07"

Results
	Winner	Peter Sagan (SVK)	(Cannondale)
	Second	Simone Ponzi (ITA)	(Astana)
	Third	Ryder Hesjedal (CAN)	(Garmin–Sharp)

The 2013 Grand Prix Cycliste de Montréal is the fourth edition of the Grand Prix Cycliste de Montréal, a single-day professional bicycle road race. It was held on 15 September 2013, over a distance of 205.7 km (127.8 mi), starting and finishing in Montréal, Quebec, Canada. It was the 26th event of the 2013 UCI World Tour season. The race is one of only two events which are part of the World Tour calendar in North America, the other one being the 2013 Grand Prix Cycliste de Québec contested two days prior.

== Teams ==
The race is held under the auspices of the UCI World Tour, and all nineteen UCI ProTeams are invited automatically. There is also one wildcard invitation, taken byTeam Europcar. A Canadian national squad also competed in the race, and as such, formed the event's 21-team peloton. The 21 teams that competed in the race were:

- Ag2r–La Mondiale
- Astana
- Belkin Pro Cycling
- BMC Racing Team
- Canada (national team) †
- Cannondale
- Euskaltel–Euskadi
- FDJ.fr
- Garmin–Sharp
- Team Katusha
- Lampre–Merida
- Lotto–Belisol
- Movistar Team
- Omega Pharma–Quick-Step
- Orica–GreenEDGE
- RadioShack–Leopard
- Team Europcar †
- Saxo–Tinkoff
- Team Sky
- Vacansoleil–DCM

== Course ==
The race consisted of 17 laps of a circuit 12.1 km (7.5 mi) in length, and followed the same path as the 2011 edition. The circuit, around the main campus of the Université de Montréal, was well-suited for climbers and punchers with three climbs per lap. The finish was on an uphill climb with a small gradient of 4%, that was located on Avenue du Parc. There was a sharp, 180 degrees bend to the right situated 500 meters away from the line. The total vertical climb of the race was 3,893 metres. The major difficulties were:

- Kilometre 2: Côte Camilien-Houde: 1,8 kilometres, average gradient of 8%
- Kilometre 6: Côte de la Polytechnque: 780 metres, average gradient of 6% with a pass of 200 metres at 11%
- Kilometre 11: Avenue du Parc: 560 metres, average gradient of 4%

== Results ==
	Cyclist	Team	Time	UCI World Tour Points
1	Peter Sagan (SVK)	Cannondale	5h 20' 07"	80
2	Simone Ponzi (ITA)	Astana	+ 4"	60
3	Ryder Hesjedal (CAN)	Garmin–Sharp	+ 4"	50
4	Greg Van Avermaet (BEL)	BMC Racing Team	+ 7"	40
5	Filippo Pozzato (ITA)	Lampre–Merida	+ 7"	30
6	Rui Costa (POR)	Movistar Team	+ 7"	22
7	Enrico Gasparotto (ITA)	Astana	+ 7"	14
8	Lars Petter Nordhaug (NOR)	Belkin Pro Cycling	+ 9"	10
9	Ion Izagirre (ESP)	Euskaltel–Euskadi	+ 9"	6
10	Jan Bakelants (BEL)	RadioShack–Leopard	+ 9"	2
