= List of wins by Astana Pro Team and its successors =

This is a comprehensive list of victories of the XDS Astana Team cycling team. The races are categorized according to the UCI Continental Circuits rules.

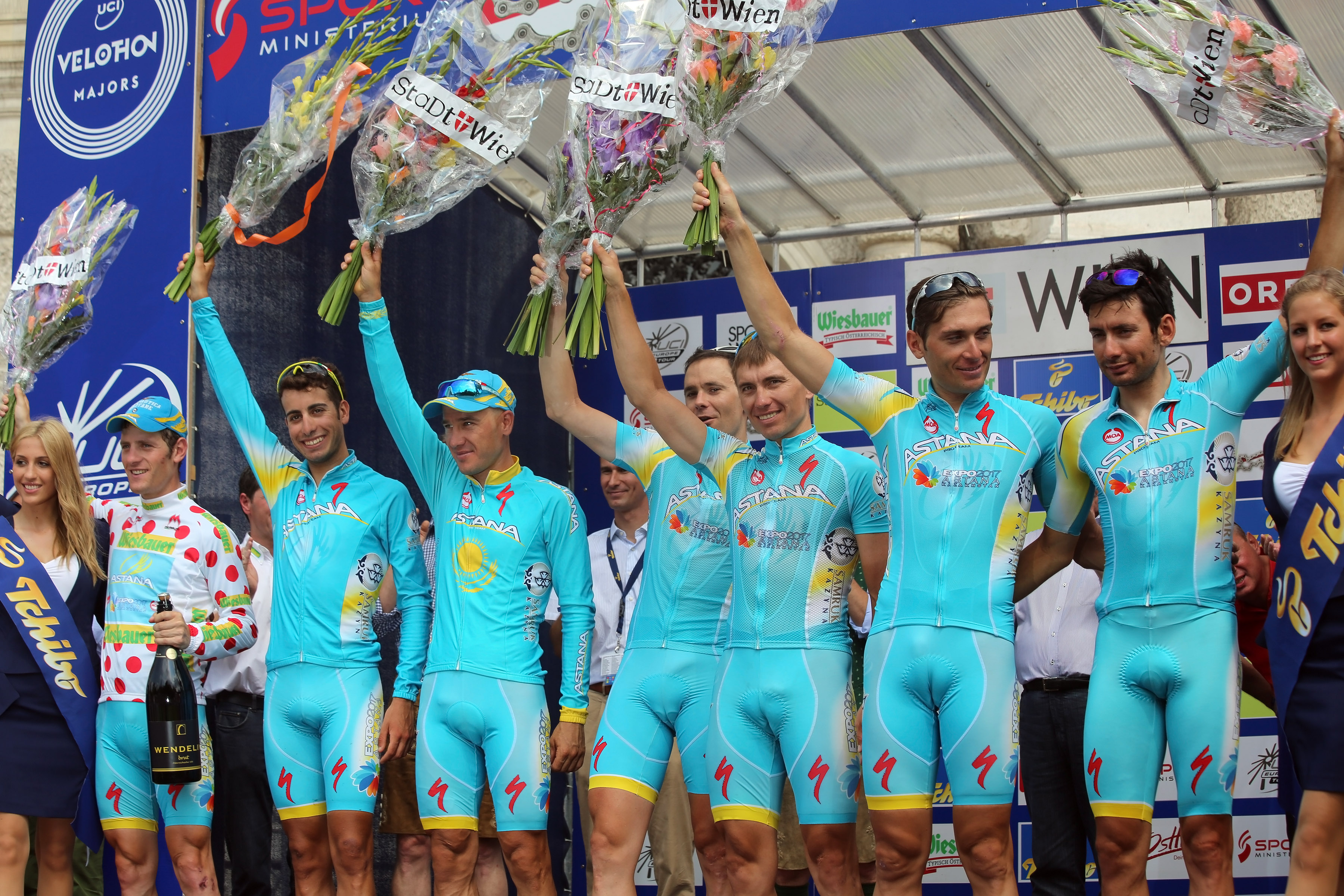
Österreich-Rundfahrt 2013 Wien

== 2007 – Astana Pro Team ==
Trofeo Soller, Antonio Colóm
Overall Tirreno–Adriatico, Andreas Klöden
Overall Circuit de la Sarthe, Andreas Klöden

Stage 3, Andreas Klöden

Prologue Tour de Romandie, Paolo Savoldelli
Stage 20 Giro d'Italia, Paolo Savoldelli
Overall Tour de Luxembourg, Grégory Rast

Stage 4, Grégory Rast

Stage 3 & 7, Critérium du Dauphiné Libéré, Alexander Vinokourov
Stage 5 Critérium du Dauphiné Libéré, Antonio Colóm
Stage 6 Critérium du Dauphiné Libéré, Maxim Iglinsky
Kazakhstan Road Race Championship, Maxim Iglinsky
Luxembourg Road Race Championship, Benoît Joachim
Stage 3 & 7 Herald Sun Tour, Aaron Kemps
Stage 4 & 6 Herald Sun Tour, Steve Morabito

== 2008 – Astana Pro Team ==
Stage 2 Volta ao Algarve, Tomas Vaitkus
Overall Tour of California, Levi Leipheimer

Stage 5, Levi Leipheimer

Stage 2 Vuelta a Murcia, José Luis Rubiera
Ronde van het Groene Hart, Tomas Vaitkus
Overall Vuelta a Castilla y León, Alberto Contador

Stages 1 & 4, Alberto Contador

Overall Vuelta al País Vasco, Alberto Contador

Stages 1 & 6, Alberto Contador

Overall Tour de Romandie, Andreas Klöden

Stage 1, Maxim Iglinsky
Stage 3, Andreas Klöden

Overall Giro d'Italia, Alberto Contador
Prologue Critérium du Dauphiné Libéré, Levi Leipheimer
Kazakhstan Road Race Championships, Assan Bazayev
Kazakhstan Time Trial Championships, Andrey Mizurov
Russia Road Race Championships, Serguei Ivanov
Russia Time Trial Championships, Vladimir Gusev
Lithuania Road Race Championships, Tomas Vaitkus
Portugal Time Trial Championships, Sérgio Paulinho
Stage 5 Tour of Austria, René Haselbacher
Overall Tour de Wallonie, Serguei Ivanov
Clásica a los Puertos de Guadarrama, Levi Leipheimer
Overall Vuelta a España, Alberto Contador

Stages 5 & 20, Levi Leipheimer
Stages 13 & 14, Alberto Contador

== 2009 – Astana Pro Team ==
Overall Tour of California, Levi Leipheimer

Stage 6, Levi Leipheimer

Overall Volta ao Algarve, Alberto Contador

Stage 4, Alberto Contador

Stages 1 & 6 Paris–Nice, Alberto Contador
Stage 5 Tirreno–Adriatico, Andreas Klöden
Overall Vuelta a Castilla y León, Levi Leipheimer

Stage 2, Levi Leipheimer

Overall Vuelta al País Vasco, Alberto Contador

Stages 3 & 6, Alberto Contador

Stage 1 Giro del Trentino, Andreas Klöden
Prologue Tour du Luxembourg, Grégory Rast
Slovenia Time Trial Championships, Janez Brajkovič
Spain Time Trial Championships, Alberto Contador
Overall Tour de France, Alberto Contador

Stage 4, Team Time Trial
Stages 15 & 18, Alberto Contador

Chrono des Nations, Alexander Vinokourov
Team classification, Tour de France
Team classification, Giro D'Italia

== 2010 – Astana Pro Team ==
Overall Volta ao Algarve, Alberto Contador

Stage 3, Alberto Contador

Montepaschi Strade Bianche, Maxim Iglinsky
Overall Paris–Nice, Alberto Contador

Stage 4, Alberto Contador

Stage 5 Tirreno–Adriatico, Enrico Gasparotto
Overall Vuelta a Castilla y León, Alberto Contador

Stage 4, Alberto Contador

Overall Giro del Trentino, Alexander Vinokourov

Stage 1, Alexander Vinokourov

Liège–Bastogne–Liège, Alexander Vinokourov
Prologue & Stage 6 Critérium du Dauphiné, Alberto Contador
Stage 5 Critérium du Dauphiné, Daniel Navarro
Slovenia Road Race Championships, Gorazd Štangelj
Kazakhstan Road Race Championships, Maxim Gourov
Stage 13 Tour de France, Alexander Vinokourov

Alberto Contador originally finished 1st overall, but was later disqualified

Overall Tour of Hainan, Valentin Iglinsky

Stage 2, Valentin Iglinsky

== 2011 – Astana Pro Team ==
Stage 7 Paris–Nice, Rémy Di Gregorio
Stage 3 Tour of the Basque Country, Alexander Vinokourov
Stage 4 Giro del Trentino, Roman Kreuziger
Stage 2 Presidential Cycling Tour of Turkey, Valentin Iglinsky
Stage 3 Tour de Romandie, Alexander Vinokourov
Stage 19 Giro d'Italia, Paolo Tiralongo
Young rider classification in the Giro d'Italia, Roman Kreuziger
Kazakhstan Road Race Championships, Andrey Mizurov
Overall Tour of Austria, Fredrik Kessiakoff

Stage 2, Fredrik Kessiakoff

Overall Tour of Hainan, Valentin Iglinsky

Stage 8, Valentin Iglinsky

== 2012 – Astana Pro Team ==
Estonia Road Race Championships, Tanel Kangert
Kazakhstan Road Race Championships, Assan Bazayev
Slovenia Road Race Championships, Borut Božič
Ukraine Road Race Championships, Andriy Hryvko
Kazakhstan Time Trial Championships, Dmitriy Gruzdev
Ukraine Time Trial Championships, Andriy Hryvko
Stage 3 Volta a Catalunya, Janez Brajkovič
Amstel Gold Race, Enrico Gasparotto
Liège–Bastogne–Liège, Maxim Iglinsky
Overall Tour of Turkey, Alexsandr Dyachenko (Note: Bulgaria's Ivailo Gabrovski initially won the race, but tested positive for erythropoietin (EPO) during the event. As a result, Dyachenko was promoted to the winner of the race and gained a stage victory as well.)

Stage 3, Alexsandr Dyachenko

Stage 7 Giro d'Italia, Paolo Tiralongo
Stage 19 Giro d'Italia, Roman Kreuziger
Overall Tour of Slovenia, Janez Brajkovič

Stage 1, Simone Ponzi

Stage 7 (ITT) Tour de Suisse, Fredrik Kessiakoff
Stage 9 Tour de Suisse, Tanel Kangert
Stage 11 (ITT) Vuelta a España, Fredrik Kessiakoff
Stage 3 Tour of Beijing, Francesco Gavazzi
Overall Tour of Hainan, Dmitriy Gruzdev

Stage 7, Dmitriy Gruzdev

== 2013 – Astana Pro Team ==
Stage 7 Tour de Langkawi, Andrea Guardini
Overall Tirreno–Adriatico, Vincenzo Nibali
Overall Giro del Trentino, Vincenzo Nibali

Stage 4, Vincenzo Nibali

Overall Giro d'Italia, Vincenzo Nibali

Stages 18 (ITT) & 20, Vincenzo Nibali

Stage 4 Tour of Belgium, Maxim Iglinsky
Estonia Time Trial Championships, Tanel Kangert
Kazakhstan Road Race Championships, Alexsandr Dyachenko
Stages 1 & 2 Tour of Austria, Kevin Seeldraeyers
Stage 1 Vuelta a Burgos, Simone Ponzi
Stage 1 Vuelta a España, Team time trial

== 2014 – Astana Pro Team ==
Stages 3 & 10 Tour de Langkawi, Andrea Guardini
Stage 7 Volta a Catalunya, Lieuwe Westra
Stage 4 Giro del Trentino, Mikel Landa
Stage 15 Giro d'Italia, Fabio Aru
Stage 7 Critérium du Dauphiné, Lieuwe Westra
Kazakhstan Time Trial Championships, Daniil Fominykh
Italy Road Race Championships, Vincenzo Nibali
Overall Tour de France, Vincenzo Nibali

Stages 2, 10, 13 & 18, Vincenzo Nibali

Stages 2 & 4 Danmark Rundt, Andrea Guardini
Stage 5 (ITT) Danmark Rundt, Alexey Lutsenko
Stage 1 Eneco Tour, Andrea Guardini
Stages 11 & 18 Vuelta a España, Fabio Aru
Tour of Almaty, Alexey Lutsenko
Stage 3 Tour of Hainan, Arman Kamyshev

== 2015 – Astana Pro Team ==
Vuelta a Murcia, Rein Taaramäe
Stage 1 Tour of Oman, Andrea Guardini
Stages 1, 2, 4 & 8 Tour de Langkawi, Andrea Guardini
Stage 5 Tour of the Basque Country, Mikel Landa
Stage 4 Giro del Trentino, Paolo Tiralongo
Stage 2 Tour de Picardie, Andrea Guardini
Stage 9 Giro d'Italia, Paolo Tiralongo
Stage 1 World Ports Classic, Andrea Guardini
Stages 15 & 16 Giro d'Italia, Mikel Landa
Stages 19 & 20 Giro d'Italia, Fabio Aru
Team classification, Giro d'Italia
Stage 8 Tour de Suisse, Alexey Lutsenko
European Games Road Race, Luis León Sánchez
Kazakhstan Time Trial Championships, Alexey Lutsenko
Italy Road Race Championships, Vincenzo Nibali
Stage 19 Tour de France, Vincenzo Nibali
Stage 1 Danmark Rundt, Lars Boom
Overall Vuelta a Burgos, Rein Taaramäe

Stage 2, Team time trial
Stage 4, Miguel Ángel López

Overall Arctic Race of Norway, Rein Taaramäe
Overall Vuelta a España, Fabio Aru

Stage 11, Mikel Landa

Coppa Bernocchi, Vincenzo Nibali
Tre Valli Varesine, Vincenzo Nibali
Milano–Torino, Diego Rosa
Tour of Almaty, Alexey Lutsenko
Il Lombardia, Vincenzo Nibali
Stage 1 Abu Dhabi Tour, Andrea Guardini
Stage 8 Tour of Hainan, Andrey Zeits

== 2016 – Astana Pro Team ==
Stage 6 Tour de San Luis, Miguel Ángel López
Overall La Méditerranéenne, Andriy Hrivko

Stage 3, Andriy Hrivko

Stage 2 Volta ao Algarve, Luis León Sánchez
Overall Tour of Oman, Vincenzo Nibali

Stage 4, Vincenzo Nibali

Stages 1, 5, 7 & 8 Tour de Langkawi, Andrea Guardini
Stage 4 Tour de Langkawi, Miguel Ángel López
Stage 5 Paris–Nice, Alexey Lutsenko
Overall Three Days of De Panne, Lieuwe Westra
Stage 1 Tour of the Basque Country, Luis León Sánchez
Stage 5 Tour of the Basque Country, Diego Rosa
Stage 1 (TTT) Giro del Trentino
Stages 3 & 4 Giro del Trentino, Tanel Kangert
Overall Giro d'Italia, Vincenzo Nibali

Stage 19, Vincenzo Nibali
Team classification

Stage 3 Critérium du Dauphiné, Fabio Aru
Overall Tour de Suisse, Miguel Ángel López
Kazakhstan Time Trial Championships, Dmitriy Gruzdev
Latvia Time Trial Championships, Gatis Smukulis
Latvia Road Race Championships, Gatis Smukulis
Kazakhstan Road Race Championships, Arman Kamyshev
Stage 2 (TTT) Vuelta a Burgos
Milano–Torino, Miguel Ángel López
Tour of Almaty, Alexey Lutsenko
Overall Abu Dhabi Tour, Tanel Kangert

Stage 3, Tanel Kangert

Overall Tour of Hainan, Alexey Lutsenko

Stage 3 Tour of Hainan, Ruslan Tleubayev
Stage 8 Tour of Hainan, Alexey Lutsenko

== 2017 – Astana Pro Team ==
Stage 1 Tour of the Alps, Michele Scarponi
Overall Critérium du Dauphiné, Jakob Fuglsang

Stages 6 & 8, Jakob Fuglsang

Kazakhstan Time Trial Championships, Zhandos Bizhigitov
Kazakhstan Road Race Championships, Artyom Zakharov
Italy Road Race Championships, Fabio Aru
Prologue Tour of Austria, Oscar Gatto
Stage 5 Tour de France, Fabio Aru
Stage 4 Tour of Austria, Miguel Ángel López
Stage 5 Vuelta a Burgos, Miguel Ángel López
Stage 5 Vuelta a España, Alexey Lutsenko
Stages 11 & 15 Vuelta a España, Miguel Ángel López

== 2018 – Astana Pro Team ==
Vuelta Ciclista a la Region de Murcia Costa Calida, Luis León Sánchez
Overall Tour of Oman, Alexey Lutsenko

Stage 4, Magnus Cort Nielsen
Stage 5, Miguel Ángel López

Omloop Het Nieuwsblad, Michael Valgren
Stages 2 & 4 Tour de Langkawi, Riccardo Minali
Stage 5 Tour of the Basque Country, Omar Fraile
Amstel Gold Race, Michael Valgren
Stage 1 Tour of the Alps, Pello Bilbao
Stage 2 Tour of the Alps, Miguel Ángel López
Stage 4 Tour of the Alps, Luis León Sánchez
Youth classification Giro d'Italia, Miguel Ángel López
Stage 1 Tour de Romandie, Omar Fraile
Stage 2 Tour de Yorkshire, Magnus Cort Nielsen
Stage 6 Critérium du Dauphiné, Pello Bilbao
Ukraine National Time Trial Championships, Andrei Grivko
Kazakhstan National Time Trial Championships, Daniil Fominykh
Estonia National Time Trial Championships, Tanel Kangert
Kazakhstan National Road Race Championships, Alexey Lutsenko
Stage 6 Tour of Austria, Alexey Lutsenko
Stage 14 Tour de France, Omar Fraile
Stage 15 Tour de France, Magnus Cort Nielsen
Stage 3 Vuelta a Burgos, Miguel Ángel López
Stage 5 BinckBank Tour, Magnus Cort Nielsen
Overall Arctic Race of Norway, Sergei Chernetski
Asian Games Road Race, Alexey Lutsenko
Overall Tour of Almaty, Davide Villella

Stage 1, Luis León Sánchez
Stage 2, Davide Villella

Stage 4 Presidential Cycling Tour of Turkey, Alexey Lutsenko

== 2019 – Astana Pro Team ==
Overall Volta a la Comunitat Valenciana, Ion Izagirre
Overall Vuelta Ciclista a la Region de Murcia Costa Calida, Luis León Sánchez

Stage 1, Pello Bilbao
Stage 2, Luis León Sánchez

Overall Tour Colombia, Miguel Ángel López
Overall Tour de la Provence, Gorka Izagirre
Overall Tour of Oman, Alexey Lutsenko

Stages 2, 3 & 5, Alexey Lutsenko

Overall Vuelta a Andalucía, Jakob Fuglsang
Overall Tour of Rwanda, Merhawi Kudus

Stages 2 & 3, Merhawi Kudus
Stage 8, Rodrigo Contreras

Stage 4 Paris–Nice, Magnus Cort
Stage 4 Tirreno–Adriatico, Alexey Lutsenko
Stage 5 Tirreno–Adriatico, Jakob Fuglsang
Stage 8 Paris–Nice, Ion Izagirre
Overall Volta a Catalunya, Miguel Ángel López

Stage 4, Miguel Ángel López

Overall Tour of the Basque Country, Ion Izagirre
Liège–Bastogne–Liège, Jakob Fuglsang
Youth classification Giro d'Italia, Miguel Ángel López

Stages 7 & 20 Giro d'Italia, Pello Bilbao
Stage 15 Giro d'Italia, Dario Cataldo

Stage 2 Tour de Suisse, Luis León Sánchez
Overall Critérium du Dauphiné, Jakob Fuglsang
Kazakhstan Time Trial Championships, Alexey Lutsenko
Kazakhstan Road Race Championships, Alexey Lutsenko
European Games, Road Race, Davide Ballerini
Overall Arctic Race of Norway, Alexey Lutsenko
Stage 1 (TTT) Vuelta a España
Overall Tour of Almaty, Yuriy Natarov
Stage 16 Vuelta a España, Jakob Fuglsang
Coppa Sabatini, Alexey Lutsenko
Memorial Marco Pantani, Alexey Lutsenko
Stage 3 CRO Race, Yevgeniy Gidich

== 2020 – Astana Pro Team ==
Stage 2 Tour de la Provence, Aleksandr Vlasov
Stage 2 Vuelta a Murcia, Luis León Sánchez
Overall Vuelta a Andalucía, Jakob Fuglsang

Stages 1 & 3, Jakob Fuglsang

Stage 4 Volta ao Algarve, Miguel Ángel López
Gran Trittico Lombardo, Gorka Izagirre
Mont Ventoux Dénivelé Challenge, Aleksandr Vlasov
Il Lombardia, Jakob Fuglsang
Giro dell'Emilia, Aleksandr Vlasov
Spain National Road Race Championships, Luis León Sánchez
Memorial Marco Pantani, Fabio Felline
Stage 6 Tour de France, Alexey Lutsenko
Stage 17 Tour de France, Miguel Ángel López
Stage 6 Vuelta a España, Ion Izagirre

== 2021 – Astana–Premier Tech ==
Stage 2 Tour of the Basque Country, Alex Aranburu
Stage 4 Tour of the Basque Country, Ion Izagirre
Stage 4 (ITT) Critérium du Dauphiné, Alexey Lutsenko
Russia Time Trial Championships, Aleksandr Vlasov
Spain Time Trial Championships, Ion Izagirre
Italy Time Trial Championships, Matteo Sobrero
Kazakhstan Road Race Championships, Yevgeniy Fedorov
Spain Road Race Championships, Omar Fraile
Eritrea Time Trial Championships, Merhawi Kudus
Prueba Villafranca – Ordiziako Klasika, Luis León Sánchez
Canada Time Trial Championships, Hugo Houle
Coppa Ugo Agostoni, Alexey Lutsenko
Veneto Classic, Samuele Battistella

== 2022 – Astana Qazaqstan Team ==
Clásica Jaén, Alexey Lutsenko
Stage 4 Tour of the Alps, Miguel Ángel López
Kazakhstan Time Trial Championships, Yuriy Natarov
Kazakhstan Road Race Championships, Yevgeniy Gidich
Stage 1 Tour de Langkawi, Gleb Syritsa

== 2023 – Astana Qazaqstan Team ==
Stage 3 Volta a la Comunitat Valenciana, Simone Velasco
Overall Giro di Sicilia, Alexey Lutsenko

Stage 4, Alexey Lutsenko

Stage 21 Giro d'Italia, Mark Cavendish
Kazakhstan Time Trial Championships, Alexey Lutsenko
Italy Road Race Championships, Simone Velasco
Kazakhstan Road Race Championships, Alexey Lutsenko
Circuito de Getxo, Alexey Lutsenko
Stage 2 Arctic Race of Norway, Michele Gazzoli
Memorial Marco Pantani, Alexey Lutsenko
Stages 2 & 8 Tour de Langkawi, Gleb Syritsa
Overall Tour de Kyushu, Andrey Zeits

Stage 2, Andrey Zeits

Overall Presidential Tour of Turkey, Alexey Lutsenko

Stage 3, Alexey Lutsenko

== 2024 – Astana Qazaqstan Team ==
Stage 2 Tour Colombia, Harold Tejada
Stage 4 Tour Colombia, Mark Cavendish
Overall Giro d'Abruzzo, Alexey Lutsenko

Stage 3, Alexey Lutsenko

Stage 2 Presidential Tour of Turkey, Max Kanter
Stage 2 Tour de Hongrie, Mark Cavendish
Kazakhstan Time Trial Championships, Dmitriy Gruzdev
Kazakhstan Road Race Championships, Dmitriy Gruzdev
Stage 5 Tour de France, Mark Cavendish
Stage 5 Tour of Hainan, Ivan Smirnov
Stage 1 Tour de Langkawi, Gleb Syritsa
Stage 3 Tour de Kyushu, Ivan Smirnov

== 2025 – XDS Astana Team ==
Classic Var, Christian Scaroni
Overall Tour des Alpes-Maritimes, Christian Scaroni

Stage 1, Christian Scaroni

Overall International Tour of Hellas, Harold Martín López
Stage 1 Tour of Hainan, Matteo Malucelli
Stage 4 Tour of Hainan, Aaron Gate
Overall Tour of Turkey, Wout Poels

Stage 3, Lev Gonov
Stage 4, Wout Poels
Stage 6, Harold Martín López
Stage 8, Matteo Malucelli

Stage 2 Tour de Romandie, Lorenzo Fortunato
Famenne Ardenne Classic, Max Kanter
Overall Tour de Hongrie, Harold Martín López

Stage 3, Harold Martín López

Mountains classification Giro d'Italia, Lorenzo Fortunato

Stage 16, Christian Scaroni

Overall Boucles de la Mayenne, Aaron Gate

Stage 2, Aaron Gate

== 2026 – XDS Astana Team ==
1st Stage 7 Tour of Turkiye, Davide Ballerini

== Supplementary statistics ==
World Team Time Trial performance
World TTT Championships	2007	2008	2009	2010	2011	2012	2013	2014	2015	2016	2017	2018	2019	2020	2021	2022	2023	2024	2025
Position	Did not Exist					11	6	12	8	9	11	10	No longer Held						
Margin	Did not Exist					+ 1' 45"	+ 1' 21"	+ 2' 12"	+ 1' 37"	+ 2' 21"	+ 2' 16"	+ 2' 54"	No longer Held						
Grand Tours by highest finishing position
Race	2007	2008	2009	2010	2011	2012	2013	2014	2015	2016	2017	2018	2019	2020	2021	2022	2023	2024	2025
Giro d'Italia	3	1	4	6	5	15	1	3	2	1	14	3	7	6	4	4	24	12	21
Tour de France	–	–	1	14	37	9	7	1	4	13	5	12	19	6	7	9	34	74	14
/ Vuelta a España	–	1	13	24	18	34	2	5	1	11	8	3	5	11	26	4	46	16	12
Major week-long stage races by highest finishing position
Race	2007	2008	2009	2010	2011	2012	2013	2014	2015	2016	2017	2018	2019	2020	2021	2022	2023	2024	2025
Tour Down Under	–	31	28	13	9	61	19	22	13	15	16	8	4	17	NH		33	35	23
UAE Tour	Did not Exist												12	3	20	10	28	14	9
Paris–Nice	21	–	4	1	17	9	19	5	7	15	12	14	9	–	2	28	12	16	7
Tirreno–Adriatico	1	–	3	4	15	3	1	9	16	6	15	15	3	5	13	21	106	14	21
Volta a Catalunya	16	5	3	14	23	7	11	11	6	14	15	9	1	NH	24	24	67	10	13
Tour of the Basque Country	11	1	1	20	8	11	27	14	6	20	21	8	1	NH	10	33	22	47	8
Giro del Trentino	–	–	2	1	6	6	1	7	2	2	4	3	7	NH	3	17	24	–	–
Tour de Romandie	2	1	21	50	3	6	23	5	10	103	24	4	26	NH	7	20	21	34	4
Critérium du Dauphiné	3	3	3	2	3	7	4	7	12	8	1	23	1	5	2	25	35	31	22
Tour de Suisse	10	2	4	39	32	6	6	28	7	1	10	2	5	NH	3	19	10	18	10
Tour de Pologne	11	6	12	13	12	23	9	43	5	8	18	17	11	2	24	7	9	48	6
Eneco Tour	–	11	21	52	59	39	3	4	6	17	6	31	43	DNF	40	NH	57	10	8
Tour of Guangxi	Race did not exist										29	3	9	NH			–	8	
Monument races by highest finishing position
Monument	2007	2008	2009	2010	2011	2012	2013	2014	2015	2016	2017	2018	2019	2020	2021	2022	2023	2024	2025
Milan–San Remo	32	–	16	8	66	17	14	44	21	11	23	8	15	7	7	47	47	22	11
Tour of Flanders	8	13	26	8	35	23	34	49	6	11	11	4	72	44	70	86	63	DNF	10
Paris–Roubaix	27	–	33	–	18	23	31	40	4	63	15	33	25	NH	DNF	97	26	14	16
Liège–Bastogne–Liège	8	–	22	1	4	3	6	12	9	10	15	10	1	17	12	30	19	8	4
Giro di Lombardia	–	2	7	29	45	10	5	9	1	2	7	16	4	1	39	24	69	18	
Classics by highest finishing position
Classic	2007	2008	2009	2010	2011	2012	2013	2014	2015	2016	2017	2018	2019	2020	2021	2022	2023	2024	2025
Cadel Evans Great Ocean Road Race	Race did not exist								–	–	–	–	10	–	NH		–	8	2
Omloop Het Nieuwsblad	38	31	35	–	–	–	–	–	–	–	5	1	4	68	6	92	85	31	18
Kuurne–Brussels–Kuurne	18	33	38	–	–	–	NH	–	–	–	36	74	20	19	26	–	83	23	20
Strade Bianche	–	–	–	1	–	2	12	34	5	11	14	24	2	5	9	21	11	33	40
Classic Brugge–De Panne	14	12	12	2	6	32	24	19	12	1	–	–	20	46	22	43	55	11	6
E3 Harelbeke	11	11	3	–	16	15	12	7	11	6	6	14	20	NH	65	45	96	52	10
Gent–Wevelgem	14	22	18	7	66	45	2	43	22	19	33	24	43	36	61	89	46	75	6
Dwars door Vlaanderen	–	13	–	–	–	94	2	3	31	–	3	14	17	NH	71	81	99	41	13
Amstel Gold Race	4	7	44	3	17	1	9	8	17	22	35	1	3	NH	11	54	5	18	34
La Flèche Wallonne	4	–	27	3	4	5	30	14	8	20	22	16	2	20	13	31	49	42	21
Clásica de San Sebastián	—	26	14	2	36	35	37	16	11	17	14	18	4	NH	20	15	28	32	8
Bretagne Classic	33	13	8	23	18	16 (Note: Borut Božič originally placed eighth but was in 2019 found guilty of doping during the 2012 season resulting in the loss of his results.)	9	12	19	93	33	2	60	44	38	25	28	11	17
Hamburg Cyclassics	—	29	26	5	7	39 (Note: Borut Božič originally placed tenth but was in 2019 found guilty of doping during the 2012 season resulting in a loss of his results.)	28	14	12	13	18	13	26	NH		16	22	22	20
Grand Prix Cycliste de Québec	Race did not exist			16	10	27	17	8	11	19	24	9	15	NH		29	23	20	3
Grand Prix Cycliste de Montréal	Race did not exist			17	33	19	2	9	18	21	46	8	28	NH		29	5	54	10

Legend
—	Did not compete
DNF	Did not finish
NH	Not held
