= Luis León Sánchez =

Spanish road bicycle racer (born 1983)

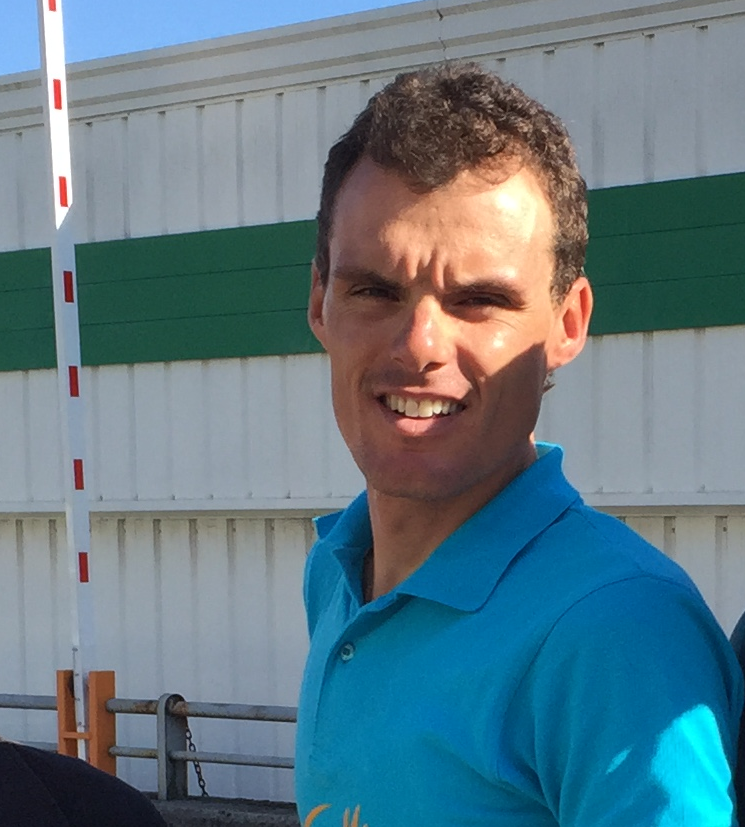
- Sánchez at the 2015 Vuelta a España

Personal information
- Full name: Luis León Sánchez Gil
- Nicknames: Lulu, Luisle
- Born: 24 November 1983 (age 42) Mula, Spain
- Height: 1.86 m (6 ft 1 in)
- Weight: 73 kg (161 lb; 11 st 7 lb)

Cycling career
- Sport: Cycling
- Current team: XDS Astana Team
- Discipline: Road
- Role: Rider
- Rider type: All-rounder

Professional teams
- 2004–2006: Liberty Seguros
- 2007–2010: Caisse d'Epargne
- 2011–2013: Rabobank
- 2014: Caja Rural–Seguros RGA
- 2015–2021: Astana
- 2022: Team Bahrain Victorious
- 2023: Astana Qazaqstan Team

Major wins
- Grand Tours Tour de France 4 individual stages (2008, 2009, 2011, 2012) Vuelta a España Mountains classification (2014) 1 TTT stage (2019) Stage races Tour Down Under (2005) Paris–Nice (2009) One-day races and Classics National Road Race Championships (2020) National Time Trial Championships (2008, 2010–2012) European Games Road Race (2015) Clásica de San Sebastián (2010, 2012) Gran Premio Bruno Beghelli (2017)
Medal record
Men's road bicycle racing
Representing Spain
European Games
Gold medal – first place	2015 Baku	Road race
Bronze medal – third place	2015 Baku	Time trial

Luis León Sánchez Gil (born 24 November 1983) is a Spanish former road bicycle racer, who last rode for UCI WorldTeam XDS Astana Team. Sánchez's major achievements include winning the overall classifications of the 2009 Paris–Nice and the 2005 Tour Down Under, as well as the one-day race Clásica de San Sebastián in 2010 and 2012. He also has four Tour de France stage victories and is a four-time winner of the Spanish National Time Trial Championships. He is a time trial specialist and has improved his climbing skills over the course of his career.

== Personal life ==
Born in Mula, he is also known as Lulu Sánchez. León is not his surname but he carries it as a middle name as a mark of respect to his grandfather originally, but since late 2006 also as a tribute to his eldest brother, León Sánchez, who died in a motorbike accident. His younger brother, Pedro León, is a professional footballer, had played for Spanish giant Real Madrid C.F.. His other brother, Antonio León Sánchez, plays indoor football. He is not related to fellow Spanish cyclist Samuel Sánchez.

== Career ==
=== Early career ===
Sánchez rode for the Liberty Seguros team from 2004 until 2006, with his major results being overall victories in the 2005 Tour Down Under, and podium positions in the 2006 Tour Down Under, and the 2006 Vuelta a Castilla y León.

=== Caisse d'Epargne (2007–10) ===
In 2007, he moved to the Caisse d'Epargne team following the collapse of the Liberty Seguros–Würth team in the wake of the Operación Puerto doping case. In his first season with the team, he won the Vuelta a Mallorca, and finished third in Paris–Nice after winning Stage 6.

The 2008 season saw Sánchez win another stage of Paris–Nice, this time finishing fifth overall. He claimed the Spanish National Time Trial Championships for the first time. He also rode his second Tour de France, and won Stage 7 after counterattacking, having been in a breakaway that was caught by the peloton.

Sánchez won the 2009 Tour Méditerranéen, and the following month won Paris–Nice after winning Stage 7 in a dominant fashion. He also won stages of the Tour of the Basque Country and the Tour du Haut Var, and took victory on Stage 8 of the Tour de France on his way to finishing 26th overall.

The 2010 season was Sánchez's most successful to date. He showed strong form in the early part of the season, finishing second in the Tour Down Under and winning the fifth stage. This was followed with another second place, in the Volta ao Algarve, after he won the final time trial. Sánchez attempted to defend his Paris–Nice title, but finished second overall, eleven seconds behind Alberto Contador. Sánchez then won the overall classification and a stage at the Circuit de la Sarthe in April. He recorded a fourth place in the Volta a Catalunya, and reclaimed his title at Spanish National Time Trial Championships. At the Tour de France, Sánchez finished second on Stage 9 after being in the breakaway, and went on to finish eleventh overall – later revised to tenth after Contador was stripped of the title – his best result to date in the Tour. Following the Tour, Sánchez took his biggest one-day race victory by winning the Clásica de San Sebastián. Sánchez also rode the Vuelta a España, and finished tenth overall after a strong final week.

=== Rabobank (2011–2013) ===
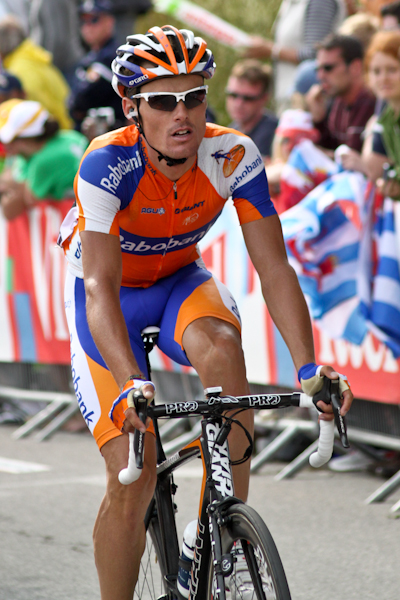
Sanchez at the 2011 Tour de France.

Sánchez joined Dutch team Rabobank for the 2011 season. Once again he won the Spanish National Time Trial Championships, and he also won Stage 9 of the Tour de France, but was unable to repeat his high overall placing of 2010, managing only 57th overall. Likewise, he rode the Vuelta a España and finished 53rd overall.

Remaining with Rabobank into 2012, Sánchez won Stage 6 of Paris–Nice after a long breakaway with veteran Jens Voigt, his fourth stage victory in the event. He also won two consecutive stages of the Tour de Romandie; on the first of these, he took the win over Lotto–Belisol's Gianni Meersman, almost pushing him in the barriers on the right side, but the commissaires judged the sprint to be legal. He led the race going into the final time trial, but put in a poor ride and dropped to tenth overall. Sánchez won the Spanish National Time Trial Championships again, and he won Stage 14 of the Tour de France, which included two category 1 climbs. He was in a breakaway with 4 other riders including Peter Sagan (Liquigas–Cannondale) when he launched a solo attack 11.5 kilometres (7.1 miles) away from the finish line to take the solo victory with a margin of 47 seconds on the chasers. Sánchez came close to a second victory on Stage 18 after he and Nicolas Roche attacked from the peloton in the final 10 kilometres (6.2 miles) overhauled the breakaway group and looked to have held off the chasing peloton only for Mark Cavendish to sprint past the pair in the final 200 metres (660 feet). On the following stage, Sánchez set the third fastest time in the time trial, with only the final two riders to set a time, Chris Froome and Bradley Wiggins, beating Sánchez.

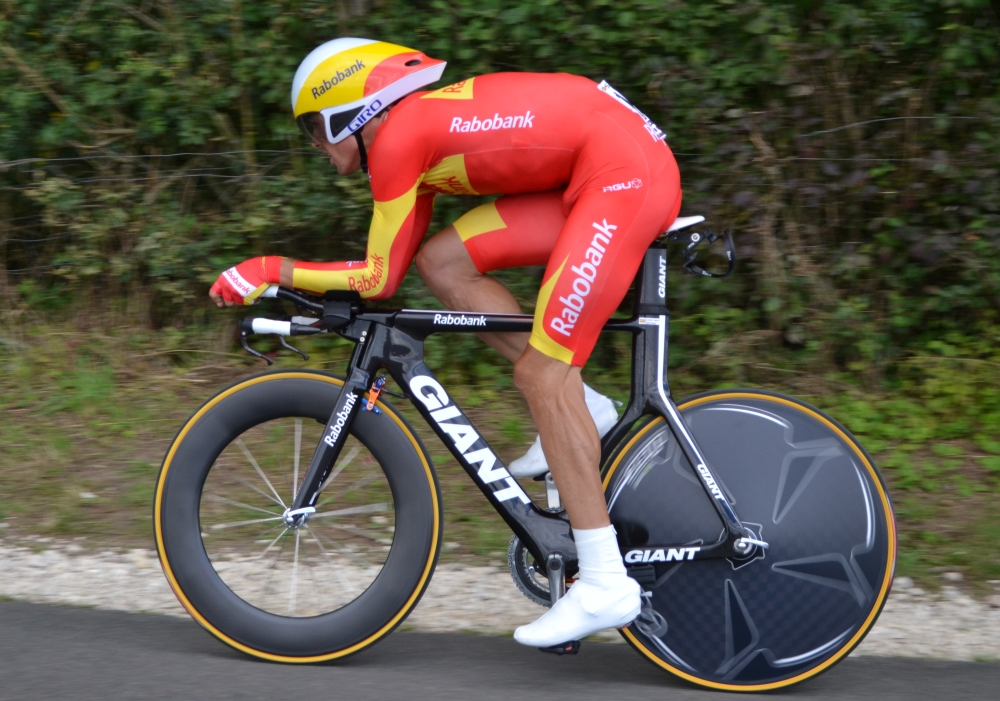
Sanchez at the 2012 Tour de France

Sánchez was selected to represent Spain in the Olympic Games in both the road race and the time trial. His time trial was wrecked by two mechanical problems, including losing his chain as he left the start ramp. He went on to win the Clásica de San Sebastián, with a strong solo attack over the closing kilometres, while his teammates Mollema and Gesink disrupted the chase. He resisted to the peloton's return during his 9-kilometre (5.6-mile) solo ordeal, never getting more than 20 seconds of an advantage over the group.

In 2013, Rabobank left cycling as a sponsor and the team became Blanco Pro Cycling. At the beginning of February, the team decided to suspend Sánchez indefinitely, saying that they will investigate the past relationship between the rider and Eufemiano Fuentes, a doctor under trial for providing athletes with doping substances and performing blood transfusions. After a few weeks, Sánchez was reinstated in the team, and returned to race in the Tour of Belgium, where he won a stage. Sánchez planned to skip the Tour de France and focus on the Vuelta a España.

=== Caja Rural (2014) ===
In October 2013, Belkin Pro Cycling announced that Sánchez would be dropped from the team as a result of accusations linking him to the Operación Puerto doping case. In December, it was announced that Sánchez would join the Caja Rural–Seguros RGA team for 2014.

=== Astana (2015–2021) ===
In August 2014, Astana announced that they had signed Sánchez on an initial one-year deal for the 2015 season.

In June 2015, he competed in the inaugural European Games, for Spain in cycling. He earned a gold medal in the road race and a bronze in the time trial.

=== Team Bahrain Victorious ===
In October 2021, Sánchez signed a two-year contract with Team Bahrain Victorious, which would extend his career to twenty professional seasons.

== Major results ==
1999
2nd Road race, National Junior Road Championships
2000
2nd Road race, National Junior Road Championships
2001
2nd Time trial, National Junior Road Championships
2004 (2 pro wins)
1st Stage 3 (ITT) Clásica Internacional de Alcobendas
1st Stage 1 Vuelta a Asturias
2nd Time trial, National Road Championships
5th Circuito de Getxo
10th Overall Circuit de la Sarthe
2005 (3)
1st Overall Tour Down Under

1st Young rider classification
1st Stage 3

1st Stage 3 (ITT) Clásica Internacional de Alcobendas
4th Overall Three Days of De Panne
2006
1st Young rider classification, Paris–Nice
2nd Overall Tour Down Under
2nd Overall Vuelta a Castilla y León
3rd Overall Three Days of De Panne
2007 (1)
1st Overall Vuelta a Mallorca

2nd Trofeo Sóller
5th Trofeo Pollença

2nd Time trial, National Road Championships
3rd Overall Paris–Nice

1st Stage 6

7th Overall Volta a la Comunitat Valenciana
2008 (3)
1st Time trial, National Road Championships
Tour de France

1st Stage 7
Combativity award Stage 7

3rd Overall Critérium International
5th Overall Paris–Nice

1st Stage 7

8th Overall Tour Down Under
2009 (6)
1st Overall Paris–Nice

1st Stage 7

1st Overall Tour Méditerranéen
1st Stage 8 Tour de France
1st Stage 1 Tour du Haut Var
2nd Time trial, National Road Championships
5th Overall Tour of the Basque Country

1st Stage 1

6th Overall Tour de Picardie
6th GP Ouest–France
8th Clásica de Almería
2010 (6)
1st Time trial, National Road Championships
1st Overall Circuit de la Sarthe

1st Stage 1

1st Clásica de San Sebastián
2nd Overall Volta ao Algarve

1st Stage 5 (ITT)

2nd Overall Tour Down Under

1st Stage 5

2nd Overall Paris–Nice
3rd UCI World Ranking
4th Overall Volta a Catalunya
4th Clásica de Almería
7th Time trial, UCI Road World Championships
9th Overall Tour de France
9th Overall Vuelta a España
2011 (2)
1st Time trial, National Road Championships
1st Stage 9 Tour de France
6th Overall Tour of Beijing
8th Overall Volta ao Algarve
2012 (7)
1st Time trial, National Road Championships
1st Clásica de San Sebastián
1st Stage 14 Tour de France
1st Stage 6 Paris–Nice
1st Stage 2 Vuelta a Castilla y León
10th Overall Tour de Romandie

1st Stages 3 & 4

2013 (2)
National Road Championships

2nd Time trial
3rd Road race

2nd Overall Tour of Belgium

1st Stage 5

2nd Overall Tour de l'Ain

1st Stage 3

2014 (2)
Vuelta a España

1st Mountains classification
Combativity award Stages 13, 14, 16 & 18

1st Stage 3 Vuelta a Castilla y León
2nd Overall La Tropicale Amissa Bongo

1st Stage 1

2nd Prueba Villafranca de Ordizia
3rd Overall Vuelta a Andalucía
4th Road race, National Road Championships
8th Overall Tour of Turkey
8th Trofeo Serra de Tramuntana
2015 (1)
European Games

1st Road race
3rd Time trial

1st Stage 2 (TTT) Vuelta a Burgos
4th Time trial, National Road Championships
5th Overall Volta ao Algarve
5th Vuelta a Murcia
2016 (2)
1st Stage 1 Tour of the Basque Country
1st Stage 2 Volta ao Algarve
2nd Overall Volta a la Comunitat Valenciana
4th Vuelta a Murcia
10th Road race, UEC European Road Championships
Combativity award Stage 9 Vuelta a España
2017 (1)
1st Gran Premio Bruno Beghelli
4th Overall Volta ao Algarve
2018 (3)
1st Vuelta a Murcia
2nd Overall Volta a la Comunitat Valenciana
4th Road race, National Road Championships
4th Overall Tour of Almaty

1st Stage 2

5th Overall Vuelta a Andalucía
5th Overall Route d'Occitanie
8th Overall Tour of the Alps

1st Stage 4

8th Overall Tour Down Under
8th Overall Tour of Guangxi
2019 (3)
1st Overall Vuelta a Murcia

1st Points classification
1st Stage 2

1st Stage 2 Tour de Suisse
1st Stage 1 (TTT) Vuelta a España
2nd Road race, National Road Championships
2nd GP Miguel Induráin
4th Overall Tour Down Under
9th Overall Paris–Nice
10th Cadel Evans Great Ocean Road Race
2020 (2)
National Road Championships

1st Road race
2nd Time trial

1st Stage 2 Vuelta a Murcia
2021 (1)
1st Prueba Villafranca de Ordizia
3rd GP Miguel Induráin
8th Circuito de Getxo
2022
7th Overall Volta a la Comunitat Valenciana
Combativity award Stage 14 Vuelta a España

=== General classification results timeline ===
Grand Tour general classification results
Grand Tour	2004	2005	2006	2007	2008	2009	2010	2011	2012	2013	2014	2015	2016	2017	2018	2019	2020	2021	2022	2023
Giro d'Italia	—	—	—	—	—	—	—	—	—	—	—	35	—	43	25	—	—	33	—	24
Tour de France	—	108	—	—	62	26	9	57	64	—	—	—	48	—	DNF	DNF	32	—	14	DNF
/ Vuelta a España	—	—	DNF	72	—	—	9	53	—	DNF	56	33	26	32	—	23	DNF	DNF	16	61
Major stage race general classification results
Race	2004	2005	2006	2007	2008	2009	2010	2011	2012	2013	2014	2015	2016	2017	2018	2019	2020	2021	2022	2023
Paris–Nice	73	54	13	3	5	1	2	28	17	—	—	DNF	17	—	21	9	—	17	DNF	24
/ Tirreno–Adriatico	—	—	—	—	—	—	—	—	—	—	—	—	—	22	—	—	—	—	—	—
Volta a Catalunya	—	92	71	—	78	—	4	—	49	—	28	—	—	—	—	—	NH	27	—	—
Tour of the Basque Country	—	—	—	—	DNF	5	—	14	—	—	37	18	46	32	—	27	NH	—	DNF	22
Tour de Romandie	—	—	—	—	—	—	—	56	10	—	—	—	DNF	—	—	—	NH	—	40	—
Critérium du Dauphiné	—	—	—	23	—	—	—	44	12	—	—	—	33	DNF	—	—	57	—	23	—
Tour de Suisse	—	—	—	—	—	—	35	—	—	36	—	—	—	—	—	32	NH	—	—	—

Legend
—	Did not compete
DNF	Did not finish
NH	Not held
IP	In progress

Sporting positions
Preceded by Iván Gutiérrez	Spanish National Time Trial Championships; Winner; 2008	Succeeded by Alberto Contador
Preceded by Alberto Contador	Spanish National Time Trial Championships; Winner; 2010–2012	Succeeded by Jonathan Castroviejo
