= Christophe Le Mével =

French road bicycle racer

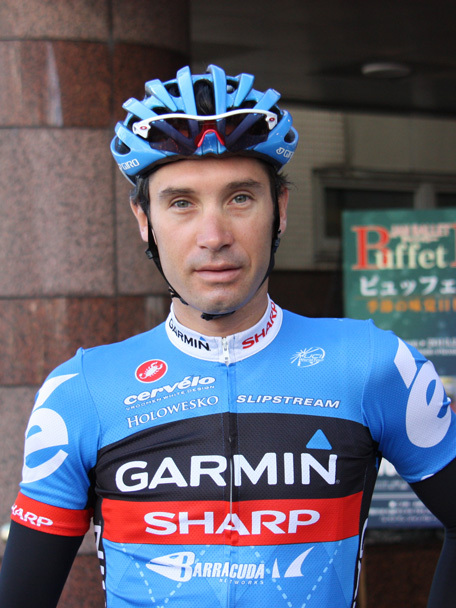
- Le Mével at the 2012 Japan Cup

Personal information
- Full name: Christophe Le Mével
- Born: 11 September 1980 (age 46) Lannion, France
- Height: 1.74 m (5 ft 9 in)
- Weight: 61 kg (134 lb; 9.6 st)

Cycling career
- Sport: Cycling
- Discipline: Road
- Role: Rider
- Rider type: All-rounder

Amateur teams
- 2000: Jean Floc'h
- 2001: Crédit Agricole Espoirs

Professional teams
- 2002–2008: Crédit Agricole
- 2009–2010: Française des Jeux
- 2011–2012: Garmin–Cervélo
- 2013–2014: Cofidis

Major wins
- Giro d'Italia, 1 stage

Christophe Le Mével (born 11 September 1980 in Lannion) is a French former road racing cyclist, who competed professionally between 2002 and 2014 for the Crédit Agricole, Française des Jeux, Garmin–Sharp and Cofidis teams.

Le Mével left Garmin–Sharp at the end of the 2012 season, and joined Cofidis on a two-year contract from the 2013 season onwards. He retired in November 2014.

== Major results ==
2001
1st Overall Ronde de l'Isard
8th Paris–Bourges
10th Gran Premio della Liberazione
2003
1st Mountains classification Tour de l'Avenir
2004
3rd Overall Tour de l'Avenir
9th Classic Loire Atlantique
10th Polynormande
2005
1st Stage 16 Giro d'Italia
2nd Overall Paris–Corrèze
2009
9th Overall Tour du Haut Var
9th Overall Tour de France
10th Overall 2009 Paris–Nice
10th Overall Critérium du Dauphiné Libéré
2010
1st Overall Tour du Haut Var

1st Stage 2

2nd Road race, National Road Championships
2011
7th Giro di Toscana
8th GP Miguel Induráin
9th La Flèche Wallonne
2012
4th Clásica de San Sebastián
7th Overall Tour du Haut Var
8th Japan Cup
2013
8th Tour du Finistère
2014
6th Grand Prix de la Ville de Lillers

=== Grand Tour general classification results timeline ===
Grand Tour	2005	2006	2007	2008	2009	2010	2011	2012	2013	2014
Giro d'Italia	26	—	—	—	—	—	15	—	—	—
Tour de France	—	76	DNF	40	9	42	—	—	DNF	—
Vuelta a España	66	—	—	—	—	14	40	31	—	22

Legend
—	Did not compete
DNF	Did not finish
