= 2009 Paris–Nice =

2009 UCI World Ranking, race 2 of 24

Race details
- Dates: 8–15 March 2009
- Stages: 8
- Distance: 1,252.8 km (778.5 mi)
- Winning time: 30h 53' 51"

Results
Jersey awarded to the overall winner	Winner	Luis León Sánchez (ESP)	(Caisse d'Epargne)
	Second	Fränk Schleck (LUX)	(Team Saxo Bank)
	Third	Sylvain Chavanel (FRA)	(Quick-Step)
Jersey awarded to the points classification winner	Points	Sylvain Chavanel (FRA)	(Quick-Step)
Jersey awarded to the mountains classification winner	Mountains	Tony Martin (GER)	(Team Columbia–High Road)
Jersey awarded to the young rider classification winner	Young rider	Kevin Seeldrayers (BEL)	(Quick-Step)
	Team	(Denmark) Team Saxo Bank	

The 2009 Paris–Nice was the 67th edition of the Paris–Nice cycle race and was held from 8 March to 15 March 2009. The race started in Amilly and finished in Nice. It was won by Luis León Sánchez.

Favorites to win included Alberto Contador, who won in 2007, Cadel Evans, and Fränk Schleck. The 2008 winner, Davide Rebellin, did not take part in the event. The race was the second event in the inaugural UCI World Ranking.

== Teams ==
The following twenty UCI ProTour and UCI Professional Continental teams, containing a total of 159 riders, were selected to the 2009 Paris–Nice:

- Ag2r–La Mondiale
- Silence–Lotto
- Rabobank
- Garmin–Slipstream
- Quick-Step
- Astana
- Caisse d'Epargne
- Française des Jeux
- Team Saxo Bank
- Team Columbia–High Road
- Liquigas
- Cofidis
- Euskaltel–Euskadi
- Bbox Bouygues Telecom
- Team Katusha
- Agritubel
- Lampre–NGC
- Team Milram
- Cervélo TestTeam
- Skil–Shimano

== Route ==
Stage characteristics and winners
Stage	Date	Course	Distance	Type	Winner
1	8 March	Amilly	9.3 km (5.8 mi)	Individual time trial	Alberto Contador (ESP)
2	9 March	Saint-Brisson-sur-Loire to La Chapelle-Saint-Ursin	195.5 km (121.5 mi)	Flat stage	Heinrich Haussler (GER)
3	10 March	Orval to Vichy	178 km (111 mi)	Hilly stage	Sylvain Chavanel (FRA)
4	11 March	Vichy to Saint-Étienne	173.5 km (107.8 mi)	Hilly stage	Christian Vande Velde (USA)
5	12 March	Annonay to Vallon-Pont-d'Arc	204 km (127 mi)	Medium mountain stage	Jérémy Roy (FRA)
6	13 March	Saint-Paul-Trois-Châteaux to La Montagne de Lure	182.5 km (113.4 mi)	Mountain stage	Alberto Contador (ESP)
7	14 March	Manosque to Fayence	191 km (119 mi)	Hilly stage	Luis León Sánchez (ESP)
8	15 March	Nice to Nice	119 km (74 mi)	Mountain stage	Antonio Colóm (ESP)

== Stages ==
=== Stage 1 ===
8 March 2009 — Amilly, 9.3 km (5.8 mi) (ITT)

Stage 1 results

	Cyclist	Team	Time
1	Alberto Contador (ESP)	Astana	11' 05"
2	Bradley Wiggins (GBR)	Garmin–Slipstream	+ 7"
3	Luis León Sánchez (ESP)	Caisse d'Epargne	+ 9"
4	Tony Martin (GER)	Team Columbia–High Road	+ 11"
5	David Millar (GBR)	Garmin–Slipstream	+ 14"
6	Joost Posthuma (NED)	Rabobank	+ 18"
7	Sylvain Chavanel (FRA)	Quick-Step	+ 19"
8	Antonio Colóm (ESP)	Team Katusha	s.t.
9	Vladimir Karpets (RUS)	Team Katusha	+ 21"
10	Rémi Pauriol (FRA)	Cofidis	+ 22"

General Classification after Stage 1

	Cyclist	Team	Time
1	Alberto Contador (ESP)	Astana	11' 05"
2	Bradley Wiggins (GBR)	Garmin–Slipstream	+ 7"
3	Luis León Sánchez (ESP)	Caisse d'Epargne	+ 9"
4	Tony Martin (GER)	Team Columbia–High Road	+ 11"
5	David Millar (GBR)	Garmin–Slipstream	+ 14"
6	Joost Posthuma (NED)	Rabobank	+ 18"
7	Sylvain Chavanel (FRA)	Quick-Step	+ 19"
8	Antonio Colóm (ESP)	Team Katusha	s.t.
9	Vladimir Karpets (RUS)	Team Katusha	+ 21"
10	Rémi Pauriol (FRA)	Cofidis	+ 22"

=== Stage 2 ===
9 March 2009 — Saint-Brisson-sur-Loire to La Chapelle-Saint-Ursin, 195.5 km (121.5 mi)

Stage 2 results

	Cyclist	Team	Time
1	Heinrich Haussler (GER)	Cervélo TestTeam	4h 45' 01"
2	Mark Renshaw (AUS)	Team Columbia–High Road	s.t.
3	Mirco Lorenzetto (ITA)	Lampre–NGC	s.t.
4	Tom Veelers (NED)	Skil–Shimano	s.t.
5	Murilo Fischer (BRA)	Liquigas	s.t.
6	Sébastien Chavanel (FRA)	Française des Jeux	s.t.
7	Sébastien Hinault (FRA)	Ag2r–La Mondiale	s.t.
8	Samuel Dumoulin (FRA)	Cofidis	s.t.
9	Romain Feillu (FRA)	Agritubel	s.t.
10	Mathew Hayman (AUS)	Rabobank	s.t.

General Classification after Stage 2

	Cyclist	Team	Time
1	Alberto Contador (ESP)	Astana	4h 56' 06"
2	Bradley Wiggins (GBR)	Garmin–Slipstream	+ 7"
3	Luis León Sánchez (ESP)	Caisse d'Epargne	+ 9"
4	Tony Martin (GER)	Team Columbia–High Road	+ 11"
5	David Millar (GBR)	Garmin–Slipstream	+ 14"
6	Joost Posthuma (NED)	Rabobank	+ 18"
7	Sylvain Chavanel (FRA)	Quick-Step	+ 19"
8	Antonio Colóm (ESP)	Team Katusha	s.t.
9	Heinrich Haussler (GER)	Cervélo TestTeam	+ 20"
10	Vladimir Karpets (RUS)	Team Katusha	+ 21"

=== Stage 3 ===
10 March 2009 — Orval to Vichy, 178 km (111 mi)

Stage 3 results

	Cyclist	Team	Time
1	Sylvain Chavanel (FRA)	Quick-Step	4h 33' 12"
2	Juan Antonio Flecha (ESP)	Rabobank	s.t.
3	Sebastian Langeveld (NED)	Rabobank	s.t.
4	Stéphane Augé (FRA)	Cofidis	s.t.
5	Kevin Seeldrayers (BEL)	Quick-Step	s.t.
6	Juan Manuel Gárate (ESP)	Rabobank	s.t.
7	Jürgen Roelandts (BEL)	Silence–Lotto	s.t.
8	Marcus Burghardt (GER)	Team Columbia–High Road	+ 40"
9	Heinrich Haussler (GER)	Cervélo TestTeam	+ 1' 09"
10	Sébastien Turgot (FRA)	Bbox Bouygues Telecom	s.t.

General Classification after Stage 3

	Cyclist	Team	Time
1	Sylvain Chavanel (FRA)	Quick-Step	9h 29' 27"
2	Juan Manuel Gárate (ESP)	Rabobank	+ 32"
3	Juan Antonio Flecha (ESP)	Rabobank	+ 33"
4	Kevin Seeldrayers (BEL)	Quick-Step	+ 35"
5	Jürgen Roelandts (BEL)	Silence–Lotto	+ 37"
6	Alberto Contador (ESP)	Astana	+ 1' 03"
7	Luis León Sánchez (ESP)	Caisse d'Epargne	+ 1' 12"
8	Stéphane Augé (FRA)	Cofidis	+ 1' 14"
9	David Millar (GBR)	Garmin–Slipstream	+ 1' 17"
10	Antonio Colóm (ESP)	Team Katusha	+ 1' 22"

=== Stage 4 ===
11 March 2009 — Vichy to Saint-Étienne, 173.5 km (107.8 mi)

Stage 4 results

	Cyclist	Team	Time
1	Christian Vande Velde (USA)	Garmin–Slipstream	4h 01' 31"
2	Jonathan Hivert (FRA)	Skil–Shimano	+ 14"
3	Mirco Lorenzetto (ITA)	Lampre–NGC	s.t.
4	Christophe Moreau (FRA)	Agritubel	s.t.
5	Jens Voigt (GER)	Team Saxo Bank	s.t.
6	Amaël Moinard (FRA)	Cofidis	s.t.
7	Jakob Fuglsang (DEN)	Team Saxo Bank	s.t.
8	Maxime Monfort (BEL)	Team Columbia–High Road	s.t.
9	Fränk Schleck (LUX)	Team Saxo Bank	s.t.
10	Juan Manuel Gárate (ESP)	Rabobank	s.t.

General Classification after Stage 4

	Cyclist	Team	Time
1	Sylvain Chavanel (FRA)	Quick-Step	13h 31' 36"
2	Juan Manuel Gárate (ESP)	Rabobank	+ 6"
3	Juan Antonio Flecha (ESP)	Rabobank	+ 36"
4	Alberto Contador (ESP)	Astana	s.t.
5	Kevin Seeldrayers (BEL)	Quick-Step	+ 37"
6	Luis León Sánchez (ESP)	Caisse d'Epargne	+ 45"
7	David Millar (GBR)	Garmin–Slipstream	+ 50"
8	Antonio Colóm (ESP)	Team Katusha	+ 55"
9	Vladimir Karpets (RUS)	Team Katusha	+ 57"
10	Jens Voigt (GER)	Team Saxo Bank	+ 1' 03"

=== Stage 5 ===
12 March 2009 — Annonay to Vallon-Pont-d'Arc, 204 km (127 mi)

Stage 5 results

	Cyclist	Team	Time
1	Jérémy Roy (FRA)	Française des Jeux	4h 58' 47"
2	Thomas Voeckler (FRA)	Bbox Bouygues Telecom	s.t.
3	Tony Martin (GER)	Team Columbia–High Road	+ 3"
4	Heinrich Haussler (GER)	Cervélo TestTeam	+ 2' 33"
5	Murilo Fischer (BRA)	Liquigas	s.t.
6	Romain Feillu (FRA)	Agritubel	s.t.
7	Cyril Lemoine (FRA)	Skil–Shimano	s.t.
8	Jürgen Roelandts (BEL)	Silence–Lotto	s.t.
9	Mirco Lorenzetto (ITA)	Lampre–NGC	s.t.
10	Sébastien Hinault (FRA)	Ag2r–La Mondiale	s.t.

General Classification after Stage 5

	Cyclist	Team	Time
1	Sylvain Chavanel (FRA)	Quick-Step	18h 32' 56"
2	Juan Manuel Gárate (ESP)	Rabobank	+ 6"
3	Juan Antonio Flecha (ESP)	Rabobank	+ 36"
4	Alberto Contador (ESP)	Astana	s.t.
5	Kevin Seeldrayers (BEL)	Quick-Step	+ 37"
6	Luis León Sánchez (ESP)	Caisse d'Epargne	+ 45"
7	David Millar (GBR)	Garmin–Slipstream	+ 50"
8	Antonio Colóm (ESP)	Team Katusha	+ 55"
9	Vladimir Karpets (RUS)	Team Katusha	+ 57"
10	Jens Voigt (GER)	Team Saxo Bank	+ 1' 03"

=== Stage 6 ===
13 March 2009 — Saint-Paul-Trois-Châteaux to La Montagne de Lure, 182.5 km (113.4 mi)

Stage 6 results

	Cyclist	Team	Time
1	Alberto Contador (ESP)	Astana	4h 47' 46"
2	Fränk Schleck (LUX)	Team Saxo Bank	+ 58"
3	Luis León Sánchez (ESP)	Caisse d'Epargne	s.t.
4	Cadel Evans (AUS)	Silence–Lotto	+ 1' 27"
5	David Moncoutié (FRA)	Cofidis	s.t.
6	Jens Voigt (GER)	Team Saxo Bank	+ 1' 29"
7	Samuel Sánchez (ESP)	Euskaltel–Euskadi	+ 1' 31"
8	Jonathan Hivert (FRA)	Skil–Shimano	+ 1' 34"
9	Christophe Moreau (FRA)	Agritubel	+ 1' 44"
10	Chris Anker Sørensen (DEN)	Team Saxo Bank	+ 1' 46"

General Classification after Stage 6

	Cyclist	Team	Time
1	Alberto Contador (ESP)	Astana	23h 21' 08"
2	Luis León Sánchez (ESP)	Caisse d'Epargne	+ 1' 13"
3	Sylvain Chavanel (FRA)	Quick-Step	+ 1' 24"
4	Fränk Schleck (LUX)	Team Saxo Bank	+ 1' 38"
5	Kevin Seeldrayers (BEL)	Quick-Step	+ 2' 01"
6	Jens Voigt (GER)	Team Saxo Bank	+ 2' 06"
7	Samuel Sánchez (ESP)	Euskaltel–Euskadi	+ 2' 14"
8	Jonathan Hivert (FRA)	Skil–Shimano	+ 2' 29"
9	Antonio Colóm (ESP)	Team Katusha	+ 2' 35"
10	Yury Trofimov (RUS)	Bbox Bouygues Telecom	+ 3' 09"

=== Stage 7 ===
14 March 2009 — Manosque to Fayence, 191 km (119 mi)

Stage 7 results

	Cyclist	Team	Time
1	Luis León Sánchez (ESP)	Caisse d'Epargne	4h 43' 34"
2	Antonio Colóm (ESP)	Team Katusha	+ 50"
3	Fränk Schleck (LUX)	Team Saxo Bank	s.t.
4	Sylvain Chavanel (FRA)	Quick-Step	s.t.
5	Jens Voigt (GER)	Team Saxo Bank	+ 56"
6	David Moncoutié (FRA)	Cofidis	+ 1' 31"
7	Hubert Dupont (FRA)	Ag2r–La Mondiale	s.t.
8	Jurgen Van den Broeck (BEL)	Silence–Lotto	s.t.
9	Christophe Moreau (FRA)	Agritubel	s.t.
10	Amaël Moinard (FRA)	Cofidis	s.t.

General Classification after Stage 7

	Cyclist	Team	Time
1	Luis León Sánchez (ESP)	Caisse d'Epargne	+ 28h 5' 45"
2	Sylvain Chavanel (FRA)	Quick-Step	+ 1' 09"
3	Fränk Schleck (LUX)	Team Saxo Bank	+ 1' 21"
4	Alberto Contador (ESP)	Astana	+ 1' 50"
5	Jens Voigt (GER)	Team Saxo Bank	+ 1' 59"
6	Antonio Colóm (ESP)	Team Katusha	+ 2' 16"
7	Kevin Seeldrayers (BEL)	Quick-Step	+ 2' 29"
8	Jonathan Hivert (FRA)	Skil–Shimano	+ 2' 57"
9	Yury Trofimov (RUS)	Bbox Bouygues Telecom	+ 3' 37"
10	Christophe Le Mével (FRA)	Française des Jeux	+ 4' 00"

=== Stage 8 ===
15 March 2009 — Nice to Nice, 119 km (74 mi)

Stage 8 results

	Cyclist	Team	Time
1	Antonio Colóm (ESP)	Team Katusha	2h 47' 49"
2	Alberto Contador (ESP)	Astana	s.t.
3	Fränk Schleck (LUX)	Team Saxo Bank	+ 1"
4	Jonathan Hivert (FRA)	Skil–Shimano	+ 17"
5	Christophe Moreau (FRA)	Agritubel	s.t.
6	Sylvain Chavanel (FRA)	Quick-Step	s.t.
7	Juan Manuel Gárate (ESP)	Rabobank	s.t.
8	Christophe Le Mével (FRA)	Française des Jeux	s.t.
9	Jens Voigt (GER)	Team Saxo Bank	s.t.
10	Sandy Casar (FRA)	Française des Jeux	s.t.

General Classification after Stage 8

	Cyclist	Team	Time
1	Luis León Sánchez (ESP)	Caisse d'Epargne	+ 30h 53' 51"
2	Fränk Schleck (LUX)	Team Saxo Bank	+ 1' 00"
3	Sylvain Chavanel (FRA)	Quick-Step	+ 1' 09"
4	Alberto Contador (ESP)	Astana	+ 1' 24"
5	Antonio Colóm (ESP)	Team Katusha	+ 1' 47"
6	Jens Voigt (GER)	Team Saxo Bank	+ 1' 59"
7	Kevin Seeldrayers (BEL)	Quick-Step	+ 2' 29"
8	Jonathan Hivert (FRA)	Skil–Shimano	+ 2' 57"
9	Yury Trofimov (RUS)	Bbox Bouygues Telecom	+ 3' 37"
10	Christophe Le Mével (FRA)	Française des Jeux	+ 4' 00"

== Final standings ==
=== General classification ===
	Cyclist	Team	Time
1	Luis León Sánchez (ESP)	Caisse d'Epargne	+ 30h 53' 51"
2	Fränk Schleck (LUX)	Team Saxo Bank	+ 1' 00"
3	Sylvain Chavanel (FRA)	Quick-Step	+ 1' 09"
4	Alberto Contador (ESP)	Astana	+ 1' 24"
5	Antonio Colóm (ESP)	Team Katusha	+ 1' 47"
6	Jens Voigt (GER)	Team Saxo Bank	+ 1' 59"
7	Kevin Seeldrayers (BEL)	Quick-Step	+ 2' 29"
8	Jonathan Hivert (FRA)	Skil–Shimano	+ 2' 57"
9	Yury Trofimov (RUS)	Bbox Bouygues Telecom	+ 3' 37"
10	Christophe Le Mével (FRA)	Française des Jeux	+ 4' 00"

==== Points classification ====
	Cyclist	Team	Points
1	Sylvain Chavanel (FRA)	Quick-Step	94
2	Alberto Contador (ESP)	Astana	84
3	Antonio Colóm (ESP)	Team Katusha	76
4	Fränk Schleck (LUX)	Team Saxo Bank	75
5	Luis León Sánchez (ESP)	Caisse d'Epargne	71
6	Jens Voigt (GER)	Team Saxo Bank	67
7	Heinrich Haussler (GER)	Cervélo TestTeam	65
8	Christophe Moreau (FRA)	Agritubel	58
9	Jonathan Hivert (FRA)	Skil–Shimano	55
10	Juan Manuel Gárate (ESP)	Rabobank	48

==== Young Rider Classification ====
	Cyclist	Team	Time
1	Kevin Seeldrayers (BEL)	Quick-Step	30h 56' 20"
2	Jonathan Hivert (FRA)	Skil–Shimano	+ 28"
3	Yury Trofimov (RUS)	Bbox Bouygues Telecom	+ 1' 08"
4	Pierre Rolland (FRA)	Bbox Bouygues Telecom	+ 10' 28"
5	Jakob Fuglsang (DEN)	Team Saxo Bank	+ 18' 58"
6	Tom Peterson (USA)	Garmin–Slipstream	+ 20' 30"
7	Matthieu Ladagnous (FRA)	Française des Jeux	+ 25' 38"
8	Albert Timmer (NED)	Skil–Shimano	+ 26' 19"
9	Chris Anker Sørensen (DEN)	Team Saxo Bank	+ 28' 07"
10	Rein Taaramäe (EST)	Cofidis	+ 28' 49"

==== Mountains classification ====
	Cyclist	Team	Points
1	Tony Martin (GER)	Team Columbia–High Road	55
2	Alberto Contador (ESP)	Astana	48
3	Jérémy Roy (FRA)	Française des Jeux	32
4	Luis León Sánchez (ESP)	Caisse d'Epargne	22
5	Joan Horrach (ESP)	Team Katusha	21
6	Aitor Hernández (ESP)	Euskaltel–Euskadi	19
7	Sandy Casar (FRA)	Française des Jeux	18
8	Fränk Schleck (LUX)	Team Saxo Bank	17
9	Antonio Colóm (ESP)	Team Katusha	17
10	Martin Velits (SVK)	Team Milram	13

==== Team Classification ====
	Team	Time
1	Team Saxo Bank	92h 52' 45"
2	Française des Jeux	+ 10' 29"
3	Caisse d'Epargne	+ 13' 58"
4	Euskaltel–Euskadi	+ 15' 14"
5	Quick-Step	+ 17' 23"
6	Ag2r–La Mondiale	+ 17' 33"
7	Silence–Lotto	+ 20' 09"
8	Team Katusha	+ 20' 38"
9	Bbox Bouygues Telecom	+ 24' 52"
10	Rabobank	+ 42' 33"

== Jersey progress ==
Stage (Winner)	General Classification	Points Classification	Mountains Classification	Young Rider Classification	Team Classification
Stage 1 (ITT) (Alberto Contador)	Alberto Contador	Alberto Contador	None Awarded	Tony Martin	Astana Team
Stage 2 (Heinrich Haussler)	Alberto Contador	Heinrich Haussler	Aitor Hernández	Tony Martin	Astana Team
Stage 3 (Sylvain Chavanel)	Sylvain Chavanel	Sylvain Chavanel	Stéphane Augé	Kevin Seeldrayers	Rabobank
Stage 4 (Christian Vande Velde)	Sylvain Chavanel	Mirco Lorenzetto	Stéphane Augé	Kevin Seeldrayers	Rabobank
Stage 5 (Jérémy Roy)	Sylvain Chavanel	Mirco Lorenzetto	Tony Martin	Kevin Seeldrayers	Rabobank
Stage 6 (Alberto Contador)	Alberto Contador	Mirco Lorenzetto	Tony Martin	Kevin Seeldrayers	Team Saxo Bank
Stage 7 (Luis León Sánchez)	Luis León Sánchez	Sylvain Chavanel	Tony Martin	Kevin Seeldrayers	Team Saxo Bank
Stage 8 (Antonio Colóm)	Luis León Sánchez	Sylvain Chavanel	Tony Martin	Kevin Seeldrayers	Team Saxo Bank
Final	Luis León Sánchez	Sylvain Chavanel	Tony Martin	Kevin Seeldrayers	Team Saxo Bank

Jersey wearers when one rider is leading two or more competitions

- Bradley Wiggins wore the green jersey in Stage 2
- Heinrich Haussler wore the green jersey in Stage 4

== Withdrawals ==
Type	Stage	Cyclist	Team	Reason
DNF	2	(France) Rémi Pauriol	Cofidis	Broken collarbone
DNS	3	(Spain) José Ángel Gómez Marchante	Cervélo TestTeam	Broken arm sustained from crash in Stage 2
DNS	3	(Republic of Ireland) Dan Martin	Garmin–Slipstream	Illness
DNS	3	(Netherlands) Joost Posthuma	Rabobank	Illness
DNF	3	(France) Matteo Bono	Lampre–NGC	
DNF	3	(France) Anthony Charteau	Caisse d'Epargne	
DNS	4	(France) Sylvain Calzati	Agritubel	
DNS	4	(United Kingdom) Bradley Wiggins	Garmin–Slipstream	Death in the family
DNF	4	(Finland) Jussi Veikkanen	Française des Jeux	
DNS	5	(Spain) Íñigo Cuesta	Cervélo TestTeam	
DNS	5	(Italy) Enrico Franzoi	Liquigas	
DNF	5	(United States) Steven Cozza	Garmin–Slipstream	
DNF	5	(Belgium) Philippe Gilbert	Silence–Lotto	
DNF	5	(Denmark) Brian Vandborg	Liquigas	
DNS	6	(Belgium) Jelle Vanendert	Silence–Lotto	
DNF	6	(Spain) Jose Luis Arrieta	Ag2r–La Mondiale	
DNF	6	(France) Sébastien Chavanel	Française des Jeux	
DNF	6	(Slovenia) Simon Špilak	Lampre–NGC	
DNF	6	(France) Thomas Voeckler	Bbox Bouygues Telecom	Shoulder injury sustained from crash
DNS	7	(Netherlands) Sebastian Langeveld	Rabobank	
DNF	7	(Spain) Samuel Sánchez	Euskaltel–Euskadi	
DNF	7	(France) Mikaël Cherel	Française des Jeux	
DNF	7	(Germany) Thomas Fothen	Team Milram	
DNF	7	(Germany) Marcel Sieberg	Team Columbia–High Road	
DNF	7	(Netherlands) Tom Veelers	Skil–Shimano	
DNF	7	(France) Mickaël Buffaz	Cofidis	
DNF	7	(Spain) Javier Aramendia	Euskaltel–Euskadi	
DNF	7	(France) Romain Feillu	Agritubel	
