= 2010 Tour du Haut Var =

Race details
- Dates: 20–21 February 2010
- Stages: 2
- Distance: 376.3 km (233.8 mi)
- Winning time: 9h 02' 43"

Results
	Winner	Christophe Le Mével (FRA)
	Second	Bert De Waele (BEL)
	Third	Julien El Fares (FRA)

The 2010 Tour du Haut Var was the 42nd edition of the Tour du Haut Var cycle race and was held on 20–21 February 2010. The race started in La Croix-Valmer and finished in Montauroux. The race was won by Christophe Le Mével.

== General classification ==
Final general classification

Rank	Rider	Time
1	Christophe Le Mével (FRA)	9h 02' 43"
2	Bert De Waele (BEL)	+ 0"
3	Julien El Fares (FRA)	+ 5"
4	Cédric Pineau (FRA)	+ 5"
5	Pierrick Fédrigo (FRA)	+ 10"
6	Chris Anker Sørensen (DEN)	+ 17"
7	Florian Guillou (FRA)	+ 19"
8	Aitor Hernández (ESP)	+ 22"
9	Chris Froome (GBR)	+ 26"
10	Yuri Trofimov (RUS)	+ 26"
