= Yuri Trofimov =

Russian road bicycle racer

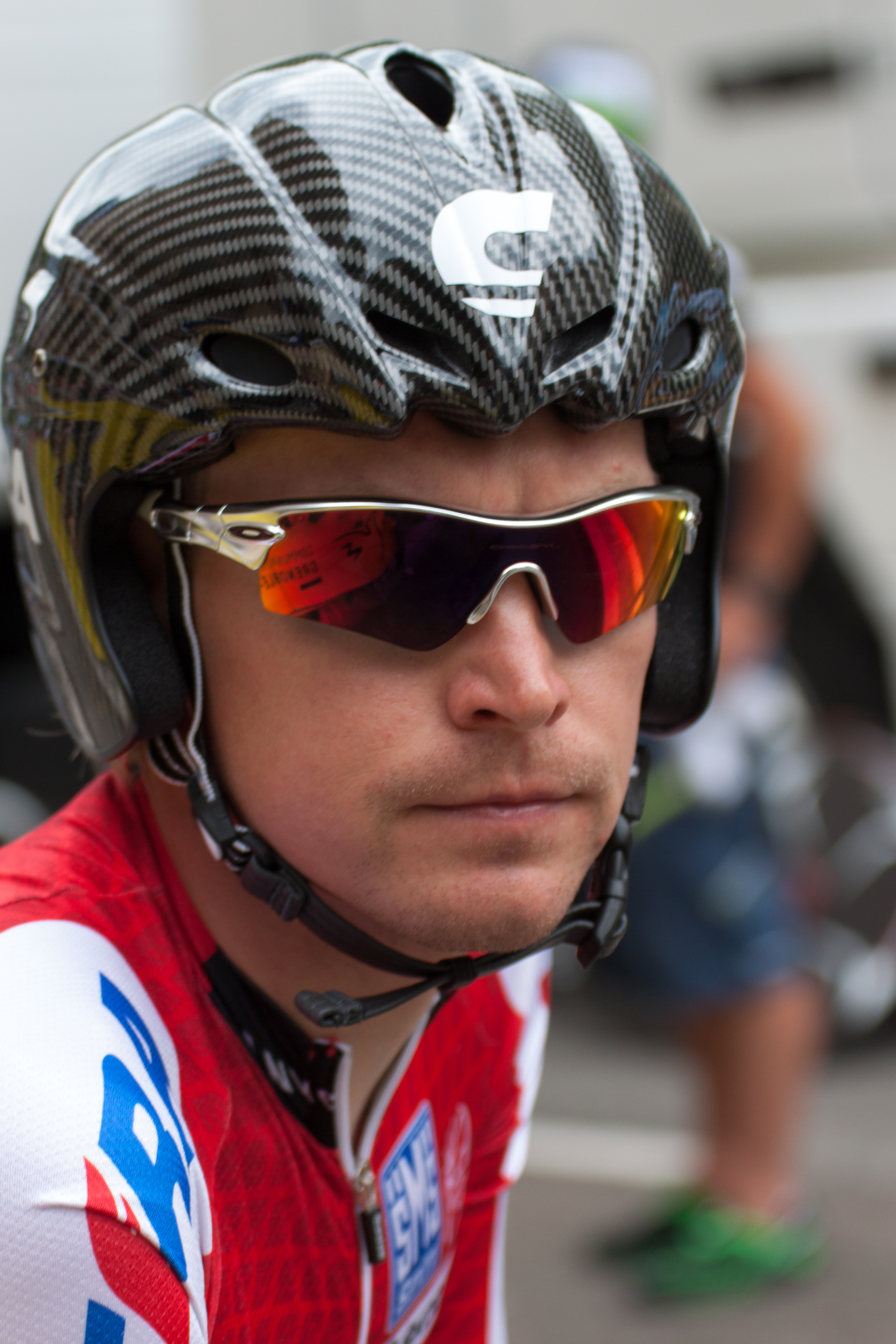
- Trofimov at the 2012 Critérium du Dauphiné

Personal information
- Full name: Yuri Viktorovich Trofimov; Russian: Юрий Викторович Трофимов
- Born: 26 January 1984 (age 42) Igra, Udmurt Republic, Soviet Union
- Height: 1.69 m (5 ft 7 in)
- Weight: 59 kg (130 lb)

Cycling career
- Sport: Cycling
- Current team: Retired
- Disciplines: Road; Mountain biking
- Role: Rider

Amateur teams
- 2004: MGFSO Dynamo Moskva
- 2005–2007: Omnibike Dynamo Moscow

Professional teams
- 2008–2010: Bouygues Télécom
- 2011–2015: Team Katusha
- 2016: Tinkoff
- 2017: Caja Rural–Seguros RGA
- 2018: Rádio Popular–Boavista

Major wins
- One-day races and Classics National Road Race Championships (2015)

Yuri Viktorovich Trofimov (Russian: Юрий Викторович Трофимов; born 26 January 1984) is a Russian former road cyclist and mountain biker, who rode professionally between 2008 and 2018 for the Bbox Bouygues Telecom (2008–2010), Team Katusha (2011–2015), Tinkoff (2016), Caja Rural–Seguros RGA (2017) and Rádio Popular–Boavista (2018) teams.

In 2015, he finished tenth at the Giro d'Italia, and he won the Russian National Road Race Championships.

== Major results ==
2002
2nd Junior cross-country, UCI Mountain Bike & Trials World Championships
3rd Junior cross-country, UEC European Mountain Bike Championships
2005
1st Under-23 cross-country, UCI Mountain Bike & Trials World Championships
1st Cross-country, National Under-23 Mountain Bike Championships
1st Mountains classification Circuit des Ardennes
3rd Under-23 cross-country, UEC European Mountain Bike Championships
3rd Road race, National Under-23 Road Championships
3rd Overall Tour de Serbie
3rd Tour du Finistère
5th Memorial Oleg Dyachenko
2006
1st Paris–Troyes
2nd Overall Tour de Serbie
2nd Grand Prix of Moscow
3rd Overall Grand Prix of Sochi
5th Tour du Finistère
7th Overall Circuit des Ardennes
7th Overall Five Rings of Moscow
2007
1st La Roue Tourangelle
1st Paris–Troyes
1st Stage 1 Les 3 Jours de Vaucluse
2nd Classic Loire Atlantique
3rd Road race, National Road Championships
6th Route Adélie
7th Grand Prix de la ville de Nogent-sur-Oise
2008
1st Overall Étoile de Bessèges

1st Stage 3

1st Stage 5 Critérium du Dauphiné Libéré
8th Grand Prix d'Ouverture La Marseillaise
2009
1st Stage 2 Tour of the Basque Country
2nd Road race, National Road Championships
3rd Overall Étoile de Bessèges
3rd Grand Prix d'Ouverture La Marseillaise
9th Overall Paris–Nice
2010
10th Overall Tour du Haut Var
10th Overall Route du Sud
2011
3rd Road race, National Road Championships
2013
6th Gran Premio Industria e Commercio di Prato
2014
1st Stage 4 Critérium du Dauphiné
5th GP Miguel Induráin
8th Overall Tour of the Basque Country
2015
1st Road race, National Road Championships
5th International Road Cycling Challenge
10th Overall Giro d'Italia
2017
1st Overall Five Rings of Moscow

1st Stage 1

=== Grand Tour general classification results timeline ===
Grand Tour	2008	2009	2010	2011	2012	2013	2014	2015	2016
Giro d'Italia	—	—	28	—	—	13	—	10	—
Tour de France	DNF	47	—	30	51	51	14	—	—
Vuelta a España	—	—	—	124	—	—	72	—	35

Legend
—	Did not compete
DNF	Did not finish
