= 2009 Tour of the Basque Country =

2009 UCI World Ranking, race 6 of 24

Race details
- Dates: 6–11 April
- Stages: 6
- Distance: 812 km (505 mi)

Results
| Jersey awarded to the overall winner | Winner | Alberto Contador (ESP) | (Astana) |
| | Second | Samuel Sánchez (ESP) | (Euskaltel–Euskadi) |
| | Third | Cadel Evans (AUS) | (Silence–Lotto) |
| Jersey awarded to the points classification winner | Points | Samuel Sánchez (ESP) | (Euskaltel–Euskadi) |
| Jersey awarded to the mountains classification winner | Mountains | Rein Taaramäe (EST) | (Cofidis) |
| Jersey awarded to the sprints classification winner | Sprints | Egoi Martínez (ESP) | (Euskaltel–Euskadi) |
| | Team | (Spain) Caisse d'Epargne | |

The 2009 Tour of the Basque Country, the 66th edition of the Tour of the Basque Country stage cycling race, started on 6 April and ended on 11 April 2009. The race was won by Alberto Contador, making this his second Tour of the Basque Country victory in a row. The race was the sixth event in the inaugural UCI World Ranking series.

== Stages ==
=== Stage 1 ===
6 April 2009 – Ataun, 142 km (88 mi)

Stage 1 results

| | Cyclist | Team | Time |
|---|---|---|---|
| 1 | Luis León Sánchez (ESP) | Caisse d'Epargne | 3h 28' 43" |
| 2 | Samuel Sánchez (ESP) | Euskaltel–Euskadi | s.t. |
| 3 | Jérôme Pineau (FRA) | Quick-Step | s.t. |
| 4 | Christian Knees (GER) | Team Milram | s.t. |
| 5 | Alexandr Kolobnev (RUS) | Team Saxo Bank | s.t. |
| 6 | Joaquim Rodríguez (ESP) | Caisse d'Epargne | s.t. |
| 7 | Michael Rogers (AUS) | Team Columbia–High Road | s.t. |
| 8 | Vincenzo Nibali (ITA) | Liquigas | s.t. |
| 9 | Dries Devenyns (BEL) | Quick-Step | s.t. |
| 10 | Cadel Evans (AUS) | Silence–Lotto | s.t. |

General Classification after Stage 1

| | Cyclist | Team | Time |
|---|---|---|---|
| 1 | Luis León Sánchez (ESP) | Caisse d'Epargne | 3h 28' 43" |
| 2 | Samuel Sánchez (ESP) | Euskaltel–Euskadi | s.t. |
| 3 | Jérôme Pineau (FRA) | Quick-Step | s.t. |
| 4 | Christian Knees (GER) | Team Milram | s.t. |
| 5 | Alexandr Kolobnev (RUS) | Team Saxo Bank | s.t. |
| 6 | Joaquim Rodríguez (ESP) | Caisse d'Epargne | s.t. |
| 7 | Michael Rogers (AUS) | Team Columbia–High Road | s.t. |
| 8 | Vincenzo Nibali (ITA) | Liquigas | s.t. |
| 9 | Dries Devenyns (BEL) | Quick-Step | s.t. |
| 10 | Cadel Evans (AUS) | Silence–Lotto | s.t. |

=== Stage 2 ===
7 April 2009 – Ataun to Villatuerta, 169 km (105 mi)

Stage 2 results

| | Cyclist | Team | Time |
|---|---|---|---|
| 1 | Yury Trofimov (RUS) | Bbox Bouygues Telecom | 4h 12' 46" |
| 2 | Rein Taaramäe (EST) | Cofidis | + 6" |
| 3 | Ben Swift (GBR) | Team Katusha | + 1' 10" |
| 4 | Michael Albasini (SUI) | Team Columbia–High Road | s.t. |
| 5 | Luis León Sánchez (ESP) | Caisse d'Epargne | s.t. |
| 6 | Francesco Gavazzi (ITA) | Lampre–NGC | s.t. |
| 7 | Fabian Wegmann (GER) | Team Milram | s.t. |
| 8 | Allan Davis (AUS) | Quick-Step | s.t. |
| 9 | Alexandr Kolobnev (RUS) | Team Saxo Bank | s.t. |
| 10 | Manuele Mori (ITA) | Lampre–NGC | s.t. |

General Classification after Stage 2

| | Cyclist | Team | Time |
|---|---|---|---|
| 1 | Luis León Sánchez (ESP) | Caisse d'Epargne | 7h 42' 39" |
| 2 | Alexandr Kolobnev (RUS) | Team Saxo Bank | s.t. |
| 3 | Jérôme Pineau (FRA) | Quick-Step | s.t. |
| 4 | Christian Knees (GER) | Team Milram | s.t. |
| 5 | Samuel Sánchez (ESP) | Euskaltel–Euskadi | s.t. |
| 6 | Michael Rogers (AUS) | Team Columbia–High Road | s.t. |
| 7 | Roman Kreuziger (CZE) | Liquigas | s.t. |
| 8 | Egoi Martínez (ESP) | Euskaltel–Euskadi | s.t. |
| 9 | Vincenzo Nibali (ITA) | Liquigas | s.t. |
| 10 | Alberto Contador (ESP) | Astana | s.t. |

=== Stage 3 ===
8 April 2009 – Villatuerta to Éibar, 163 km (101 mi)

Stage 3 results

| | Cyclist | Team | Time |
|---|---|---|---|
| 1 | Alberto Contador (ESP) | Astana | 4h 16' 29" |
| 2 | Cadel Evans (AUS) | Silence–Lotto | + 9" |
| 3 | Samuel Sánchez (ESP) | Euskaltel–Euskadi | s.t. |
| 4 | ~~Antonio Colom (ESP)~~ | ~~Team Katusha~~ | s.t. |
| 5 | Damiano Cunego (ITA) | Lampre–NGC | + 28" |
| 6 | Robert Gesink (NED) | Rabobank | + 33" |
| 7 | Luis León Sánchez (ESP) | Caisse d'Epargne | + 36" |
| 8 | Roman Kreuziger (CZE) | Liquigas | + 55" |
| 9 | Fredrik Kessiakoff (SWE) | Fuji–Servetto | s.t. |
| 10 | Vincenzo Nibali (ITA) | Liquigas | s.t. |

General Classification after Stage 3

| | Cyclist | Team | Time |
|---|---|---|---|
| 1 | Alberto Contador (ESP) | Astana | 11h 59' 08" |
| 2 | Samuel Sánchez (ESP) | Euskaltel–Euskadi | + 9" |
| 3 | Cadel Evans (AUS) | Silence–Lotto | s.t. |
| 4 | ~~Antonio Colom (ESP)~~ | ~~Team Katusha~~ | s.t. |
| 5 | Damiano Cunego (ITA) | Lampre–NGC | + 28" |
| 6 | Robert Gesink (NED) | Rabobank | + 33" |
| 7 | Luis León Sánchez (ESP) | Caisse d'Epargne | + 36" |
| 8 | Roman Kreuziger (CZE) | Liquigas | s.t. |
| 9 | Vincenzo Nibali (ITA) | Liquigas | s.t. |
| 10 | Sandy Casar (FRA) | Française des Jeux | s.t. |

=== Stage 4 ===
9 April 2009 – Éibar to Güeñes, 152 km (94 mi)

Stage 4 results

| | Cyclist | Team | Time |
|---|---|---|---|
| 1 | Michael Albasini (SUI) | Team Columbia–High Road | 3h 59' 42" |
| 2 | Jurgen Van den Broeck (BEL) | Silence–Lotto | s.t. |
| 3 | Christian Vande Velde (USA) | Garmin–Slipstream | s.t. |
| 4 | Ben Swift (GBR) | Team Katusha | + 1' 25" |
| 5 | Allan Davis (AUS) | Quick-Step | s.t. |
| 6 | Xavier Florencio (ESP) | Cervélo TestTeam | s.t. |
| 7 | Björn Schröder (GER) | Team Milram | s.t. |
| 8 | Christian Knees (GER) | Team Milram | s.t. |
| 9 | David de la Fuente (ESP) | Fuji–Servetto | s.t. |
| 10 | Samuel Sánchez (ESP) | Euskaltel–Euskadi | s.t. |

General Classification after Stage 4

| | Cyclist | Team | Time |
|---|---|---|---|
| 1 | Alberto Contador (ESP) | Astana | 16h 00' 16" |
| 2 | Samuel Sánchez (ESP) | Euskaltel–Euskadi | + 9" |
| 3 | Cadel Evans (AUS) | Silence–Lotto | s.t. |
| 4 | ~~Antonio Colom (ESP)~~ | ~~Team Katusha~~ | s.t. |
| 5 | Damiano Cunego (ITA) | Lampre–NGC | + 27" |
| 6 | Robert Gesink (NED) | Rabobank | + 32" |
| 7 | Luis León Sánchez (ESP) | Caisse d'Epargne | + 35" |
| 8 | Roman Kreuziger (CZE) | Liquigas | + 54" |
| 9 | Vincenzo Nibali (ITA) | Liquigas | s.t. |
| 10 | Sandy Casar (FRA) | Française des Jeux | s.t. |

=== Stage 5 ===
10 April 2009 – Güeñes to Zalla, 162 km (101 mi)

Stage 5 results

| | Cyclist | Team | Time |
|---|---|---|---|
| 1 | Marco Pinotti (ITA) | Team Columbia–High Road | 4h 15' 56" |
| 2 | Ben Swift (GBR) | Team Katusha | + 19" |
| 3 | Francesco Gavazzi (ITA) | Lampre–NGC | s.t. |
| 4 | Christian Knees (GER) | Team Milram | s.t. |
| 5 | Johannes Fröhlinger (GER) | Team Milram | s.t. |
| 6 | Vladimir Efimkin (RUS) | Ag2r–La Mondiale | s.t. |
| 7 | David López (ESP) | Caisse d'Epargne | s.t. |
| 8 | Peter Velits (SVK) | Team Milram | s.t. |
| 9 | Dries Devenyns (BEL) | Quick-Step | s.t. |
| 10 | Alberto Contador (ESP) | Astana | s.t. |

General Classification after Stage 5

| | Cyclist | Team | Time |
|---|---|---|---|
| 1 | Alberto Contador (ESP) | Astana | 20h 16' 31" |
| 2 | Samuel Sánchez (ESP) | Euskaltel–Euskadi | + 9" |
| 3 | Cadel Evans (AUS) | Silence–Lotto | s.t. |
| 4 | ~~Antonio Colom (ESP)~~ | ~~Team Katusha~~ | s.t. |
| 5 | Damiano Cunego (ITA) | Lampre–NGC | + 27" |
| 6 | Robert Gesink (NED) | Rabobank | + 32" |
| 7 | Luis León Sánchez (ESP) | Caisse d'Epargne | + 35" |
| 8 | Roman Kreuziger (CZE) | Liquigas | + 54" |
| 9 | Vincenzo Nibali (ITA) | Liquigas | s.t. |
| 10 | Sandy Casar (FRA) | Française des Jeux | s.t. |

=== Stage 6 ===
11 April 2009 – Zalla, 24 km (15 mi) (ITT)

Stage 6 results

| | Cyclist | Team | Time |
|---|---|---|---|
| 1 | Alberto Contador (ESP) | Astana | 31' 59" |
| 2 | ~~Antonio Colom (ESP)~~ | ~~Team Katusha~~ | + 22" |
| 3 | Samuel Sánchez (ESP) | Euskaltel–Euskadi | + 45" |
| 4 | Michael Rogers (AUS) | Team Columbia–High Road | + 45" |
| 5 | Luis León Sánchez (ESP) | Caisse d'Epargne | + 1' 13" |
| 6 | Marco Pinotti (ITA) | Team Columbia–High Road | + 1' 18" |
| 7 | Christian Vande Velde (USA) | Garmin–Slipstream | + 1' 22" |
| 8 | Cadel Evans (AUS) | Silence–Lotto | + 1' 25" |
| 9 | Robert Gesink (NED) | Rabobank | s.t. |
| 10 | Damiano Cunego (ITA) | Lampre–NGC | + 1' 26" |

General Classification after Stage 6

| | Cyclist | Team | Time |
|---|---|---|---|
| 1 | Alberto Contador (ESP) | Astana | 20h 48' 30" |
| 2 | ~~Antonio Colom (ESP)~~ | ~~Team Katusha~~ | + 32" |
| 3 | Samuel Sánchez (ESP) | Euskaltel–Euskadi | + 53" |
| 4 | Cadel Evans (AUS) | Silence–Lotto | + 1' 33" |
| 5 | Luis León Sánchez (ESP) | Caisse d'Epargne | + 1' 48" |
| 6 | Damiano Cunego (ITA) | Lampre–NGC | + 1' 53" |
| 7 | Robert Gesink (NED) | Rabobank | + 1' 57" |
| 8 | Michael Rogers (AUS) | Team Columbia–High Road | + 2' 20" |
| 9 | Vincenzo Nibali (ITA) | Liquigas | + 2' 30" |
| 10 | Roman Kreuziger (CZE) | Liquigas | + 2' 35" |

== Final standings ==
General Classification

| | Cyclist | Team | Time |
|---|---|---|---|
| 1 | Alberto Contador (ESP) | Astana | 20h 48' 30" |
| 2 | ~~Antonio Colom (ESP)~~ | ~~Team Katusha~~ | + 32" |
| 3 | Samuel Sánchez (ESP) | Euskaltel–Euskadi | + 53" |
| 4 | Cadel Evans (AUS) | Silence–Lotto | + 1' 33" |
| 5 | Luis León Sánchez (ESP) | Caisse d'Epargne | + 1' 48" |
| 6 | Damiano Cunego (ITA) | Lampre–NGC | + 1' 53" |
| 7 | Robert Gesink (NED) | Rabobank | + 1' 57" |
| 8 | Michael Rogers (AUS) | Team Columbia–High Road | + 2' 20" |
| 9 | Vincenzo Nibali (ITA) | Liquigas | + 2' 30" |
| 10 | Roman Kreuziger (CZE) | Liquigas | + 2' 35" |

Points Classification

| | Cyclist | Team | Points |
|---|---|---|---|
| 1 | Samuel Sánchez (ESP) | Euskaltel–Euskadi | 61 |
| 2 | Alberto Contador (ESP) | Astana | 59 |
| 3 | Luis León Sánchez (ESP) | Caisse d'Epargne | 58 |
| 4 | Ben Swift (GBR) | Team Katusha | 50 |
| 5 | Christian Knees (GER) | Team Milram | 37 |
| 6 | ~~Antonio Colom (ESP)~~ | ~~Team Katusha~~ | 36 |
| 7 | Marco Pinotti (ITA) | Team Columbia–High Road | 35 |
| 8 | Cadel Evans (AUS) | Silence–Lotto | 34 |
| 9 | Francesco Gavazzi (ITA) | Lampre–NGC | 31 |
| 10 | Yury Trofimov (RUS) | Bbox Bouygues Telecom | 25 |

Mountains Classification

| | Cyclist | Team | Points |
|---|---|---|---|
| 1 | Rein Taaramäe (EST) | Cofidis | 37 |
| 2 | Aitor Hernández (ESP) | Euskaltel–Euskadi | 35 |
| 3 | Christian Vande Velde (USA) | Garmin–Slipstream | 21 |
| 4 | David Moncoutié (FRA) | Cofidis | 19 |
| 5 | Egoi Martínez (ESP) | Euskaltel–Euskadi | 14 |
| 6 | Damiano Cunego (ITA) | Lampre–NGC | 12 |
| 7 | José Herrada (ESP) | Contentpolis-Ampo | 12 |
| 8 | Alberto Contador (ESP) | Astana | 11 |
| 9 | Andy Schleck (LUX) | Team Saxo Bank | 9 |
| 10 | Cadel Evans (AUS) | Silence–Lotto | 8 |

Metas Volantes Classification

| | Cyclist | Team | Points |
|---|---|---|---|
| 1 | Egoi Martínez (ESP) | Euskaltel–Euskadi | 6 |
| 2 | Yury Trofimov (RUS) | Bbox Bouygues Telecom | 6 |
| 3 | Christian Vande Velde (USA) | Garmin–Slipstream | 5 |
| 4 | Bingen Fernández (ESP) | Cofidis | 4 |
| 5 | Marco Pinotti (ITA) | Team Columbia–High Road | 3 |
| 6 | Manuele Mori (ITA) | Lampre–NGC | 3 |
| 7 | Rein Taaramäe (EST) | Cofidis | 3 |
| 8 | Aitor Hernández (ESP) | Euskaltel–Euskadi | 3 |
| 9 | Vladimir Efimkin (RUS) | Ag2r–La Mondiale | 2 |
| 10 | David de la Fuente (ESP) | Fuji–Servetto | 2 |

Team Classification

| | Team | Time |
|---|---|---|
| 1 | Caisse d'Epargne | 62h 35' 14" |
| 2 | Euskaltel–Euskadi | + 1" |
| 3 | Liquigas | + 39" |
| 4 | Team Columbia–High Road | + 4' 10" |
| 5 | Team Saxo Bank | + 4' 27" |
| 6 | Astana | + 6' 18" |
| 7 | Rabobank | + 6' 28" |
| 8 | Quick-Step | + 12' 00" |
| 9 | Team Katusha | + 15' 12" |
| 10 | Lampre–NGC | + 17' 03" |

== Jersey progress ==
| Stage (Winner) | General Classification | Points Classification | Mountains Classification | Metas Volantes Classification | Team Classification |
|---|---|---|---|---|---|
| Stage 1 (Luis León Sánchez) | Luis León Sánchez | Luis León Sánchez | Aitor Hernández | Gorka Izagirre | Caisse d'Epargne |
| Stage 2 (Yury Trofimov) | Luis León Sánchez | Luis León Sánchez | Aitor Hernández | Manuel Vázquez | Caisse d'Epargne |
| Stage 3 (Alberto Contador) | Alberto Contador | Luis León Sánchez | Aitor Hernández | Manuel Vázquez | Caisse d'Epargne |
| Stage 4 (Michael Albasini) | Alberto Contador | Luis León Sánchez | Aitor Hernández | Michael Albasini | Caisse d'Epargne |
| Stage 5 (Marco Pinotti) | Alberto Contador | Ben Swift | Rein Taaramäe | Egoi Martínez | Caisse d'Epargne |
| Stage 6 (ITT) (Alberto Contador) | Alberto Contador | Samuel Sánchez | Rein Taaramäe | Egoi Martínez | Caisse d'Epargne |
| Final | Alberto Contador | Samuel Sánchez | Rein Taaramäe | Egoi Martínez | Caisse d'Epargne |

== Withdrawals ==
| Type | Stage | Cyclist | Team | Reason |
|---|---|---|---|---|
| DNS | 2 | Tom Danielson (USA) | Garmin–Slipstream | |
| DNS | 2 | Eros Capecchi (ITA) | Fuji–Servetto | |
| DNF | 2 | Jesús Del Nero (ESP) | Fuji–Servetto | |
| DNF | 2 | Evgeni Petrov (RUS) | Team Katusha | |
| DNF | 2 | Jussi Veikkanen (FIN) | Française des Jeux | |
| DNF | 2 | Christophe Riblon (FRA) | Ag2r–La Mondiale | |
| DNF | 4 | Chris Horner (USA) | Astana | Injury sustained in crash |
| DNS | 5 | Fränk Schleck (LUX) | Team Saxo Bank | |
| DNF | 5 | 54 riders did not finish the rainy 5th stage | | |
