= Saint-Brisson-sur-Loire =

- Commune
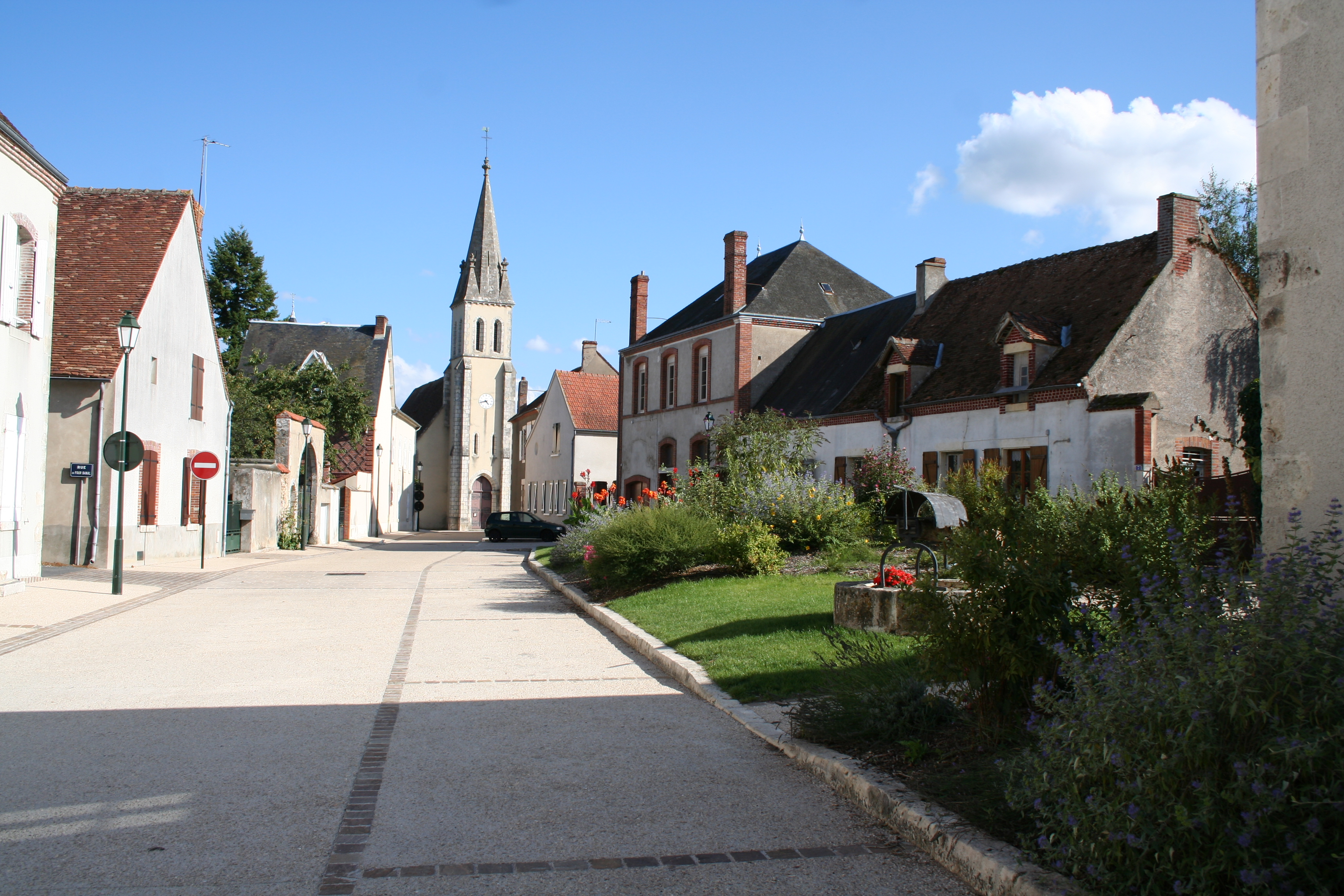
- The road to the church

- Coat of arms
- Location of Saint-Brisson-sur-Loire
- Location within France Location within Centre-Val de Loire
- Coordinates: 47°38′55″N 2°41′02″E
- Country: France
- Region: Centre-Val de Loire
- Department: Loiret
- Arrondissement: Montargis
- Canton: Sully-sur-Loire
- Intercommunality: Giennoises

Government
  - Mayor (2020–2026): Claude Pléau
- Area^{1}: 21.86 km^{2} (8.44 sq mi)
- Elevation: 155 m (509 ft)
- Highest elevation: 208 m (682 ft)
- Lowest elevation: 122 m (400 ft)
- Population (2023): 962
  - Density: 44.0/km^{2} (114/sq mi)
- Time zone: UTC+01:00 (CET)
  - Summer (DST): UTC+02:00 (CEST)
- INSEE/Postal code: 45271 /45500
- ^{1} French Land Register data, which excludes lakes, ponds, glaciers > 1 km^{2} (0.386 sq mi or 247 acres) and river estuaries.

Saint-Brisson-sur-Loire (French pronunciation: [sɛ̃ bʁisɔ̃ syʁ lwaʁ], literally Saint-Brisson on Loire) is a commune in the Loiret department in north-central France.

== Name ==
The name Saint-Brisson is traditionally derived that of Saint Brice, to whom the parish church is dedicated.

== Château ==
The Château de Saint-Brisson, built by the de Sancerre family in the early 13th century on the site of a 12th-century construction, is a tourist attraction, benefitting from its proximity to the many historic châteaux of the Loire Valley.

== See also ==
- Communes of the Loiret department
