= 2019 Cadel Evans Great Ocean Road Race =

Cycling race

2019 UCI World Tour, race 2 of 38

Race details
- Dates: 27 January 2019
- Stages: 1
- Distance: 164 km (102 mi)
- Winning time: 3h 54' 35"

Results
	Winner	Elia Viviani (ITA)	(Deceuninck–Quick-Step)
	Second	Caleb Ewan (AUS)	(Lotto–Soudal)
	Third	Daryl Impey (RSA)	(Mitchelton–Scott)

The 2019 Cadel Evans Great Ocean Road Race was a road cycling one-day race that took place on 27 January 2019 in Geelong, Australia. It was the fifth edition of the Cadel Evans Great Ocean Road Race and the second event of the 2019 UCI World Tour.

2018 runner-up Elia Viviani, from Italy, improved upon that position, as the Deceuninck–Quick-Step rider led home a 33-rider group at the finish to take the victory, ahead of the highest-placed Australian rider Caleb Ewan (Lotto–Soudal). The podium was completed by the previous week's Tour Down Under winner Daryl Impey, who finished third for the second year in succession for Mitchelton–Scott.

== Teams ==
As the race was only added to the UCI World Tour calendar in 2017, all UCI WorldTeams were invited to the race, but not obligated to compete in the race. As such, fifteen of the eighteen WorldTeams competed in the race, up three on 2018. An Australian national squad completed the 16-team peloton, therefore no UCI Professional Continental teams competed for the first time.

UCI WorldTeams

- AG2R La Mondiale
- Astana
- Bora–Hansgrohe
- CCC Team
- Deceuninck–Quick-Step
- Team Dimension Data
- EF Education First
- Team Jumbo–Visma
- Team Katusha–Alpecin
- Lotto–Soudal
- Mitchelton–Scott
- Team Sunweb
- Trek–Segafredo
- UAE Team Emirates
- Team Sky

Wildcard team

- Australia (national team)

== Result ==
Result
Rank	Rider	Team	Time
1	Elia Viviani (ITA)	Deceuninck–Quick-Step	3h 54' 35"
2	Caleb Ewan (AUS)	Lotto–Soudal	+ 0"
3	Daryl Impey (RSA)	Mitchelton–Scott	+ 0"
4	Ryan Gibbons (RSA)	Team Dimension Data	+ 0"
5	Jens Debusschere (BEL)	Team Katusha–Alpecin	+ 0"
6	Luke Rowe (GBR)	Team Sky	+ 0"
7	Michael Mørkøv (DNK)	Deceuninck–Quick-Step	+ 0"
8	Jay McCarthy (AUS)	Bora–Hansgrohe	+ 0"
9	Owain Doull (GBR)	Team Sky	+ 0"
10	Luis León Sánchez (ESP)	Astana	+ 0"
