= 2009 Tour du Haut Var =

Race details
- Dates: 21–22 February 2009
- Stages: 2
- Distance: 343.7 km (213.6 mi)
- Winning time: 8h 40' 04"

Results
	Winner	Thomas Voeckler (FRA)
	Second	David Moncoutié (FRA)
	Third	Jussi Veikkanen (FIN)

The 2009 Tour du Haut Var was the 41st edition of the Tour du Haut Var cycle race and was held on 21–22 February 2009. The race started in Saint-Raphaël and finished in Callian. The race was won by Thomas Voeckler.

== General classification ==
Final general classification

Rank	Rider	Time
1	Thomas Voeckler (FRA)	8h 40' 04"
2	David Moncoutié (FRA)	+ 5"
3	Jussi Veikkanen (FIN)	+ 7"
4	Mathieu Ladagnous (FRA)	+ 9"
5	Chris Anker Sørensen (DEN)	+ 9"
6	Jérôme Pineau (FRA)	+ 13"
7	Julien Simon (FRA)	+ 13"
8	Pierrick Fédrigo (FRA)	+ 13"
9	Christophe Le Mével (FRA)	+ 13"
10	Rémi Pauriol (FRA)	+ 13"
