= 2007 Paris–Nice =

UCI ProTour

Race details
- Dates: 11–18 March 2007
- Stages: 7 + Prologue
- Distance: 1,260.2 km (783.1 mi)
- Winning time: 29h 55' 22"

Results
Jersey awarded to the overall winner	Winner	Alberto Contador (ESP)	(Discovery Channel)
	Second	Davide Rebellin (ITA)	(Gerolsteiner)
	Third	Luis León Sánchez (ESP)	(Caisse d'Epargne)
Jersey awarded to the points classification winner	Points	Franco Pellizotti (ITA)	(Liquigas)
Jersey awarded to the mountains classification winner	Mountains	Thomas Voeckler (FRA)	(Bouygues Télécom)
Jersey awarded to the youth classification winner	Youth	Alberto Contador (ESP)	(Discovery Channel)
	Team	Caisse d'Epargne	

The 2007 Paris–Nice was the 65th edition of the Paris–Nice cycle race and was held from 11 March to 18 March 2007. The race started in Issy-les-Moulineaux and finished in Nice. The race was part of the 2007 UCI ProTour. The race was won by Spaniard Alberto Contador riding for the Discovery Channel, who going into the final stage was six seconds behind Davide Rebellin from Gerolsteiner. Contador broke away on the Col d'Eze, the last climb of the race, to claim both the stage victory along the Promenade des Anglais and the overall race victory.

== Teams ==
Twenty teams, containing a total of 160 riders, participated in the race:

- Lampre–Fondital
- Caisse d'Epargne
- Euskaltel–Euskadi
- Team CSC
- Discovery Channel
- Rabobank
- Crédit Agricole
- Predictor–Lotto
- Française des Jeux
- T-Mobile Team
- Cofidis
- Quick-Step–Innergetic
- AG2R Prévoyance
- Gerolsteiner
- Bouygues Télécom
- Liquigas
- Saunier Duval–Prodir
- Agritubel
- Team Milram
- Astana

== Route ==
Stage characteristics and winners
Stage	Date	Course	Distance	Type	Winner
P	11 March	Issy-les-Moulineaux	4.7 km (2.9 mi)	Individual time trial	David Millar (GBR)
1	12 March	Cloyes-sur-le-Loir to Buzançais	186 km (116 mi)	Flat stage	Jean-Patrick Nazon (FRA)
2	13 March	Vatan to Limoges	177 km (110 mi)	Flat stage	Franco Pellizotti (ITA)
3	14 March	Limoges to Maurs	215.5 km (133.9 mi)	Hilly stage	Alexandr Kolobnev (RUS)
4	15 March	Maurs to Mende	169.5 km (105.3 mi)	Medium mountain stage	Alberto Contador (ESP)
5	16 March	Sorgues to Manosque	178 km (111 mi)	Hilly stage	Yaroslav Popovych (UKR)
6	17 March	Brignoles to Cannes	200 km (120 mi)	Medium mountain stage	Luis León Sánchez (ESP)
7	18 March	Nice to Nice	129.5 km (80.5 mi)	Mountain stage	Alberto Contador (ESP)

== Stages ==
=== Prologue ===
11 March 2007 — Issy-les-Moulineaux, 4.7 km (2.9 mi) (ITT)

	Cyclist	Team	Time
1	David Millar (GBR)	Saunier Duval–Prodir	6' 01"
2	Roman Kreuziger (CZE)	Liquigas	+ 1"
3	Sébastien Joly (FRA)	Française des Jeux	+ 2"

=== Stage 1 ===
12 March 2007 — Cloyes-sur-le-Loir to Buzançais, 186 km (116 mi)

	Cyclist	Team	Time
1	Jean-Patrick Nazon (FRA)	AG2R Prévoyance	4h 29' 39"
2	Sebastian Siedler (GER)	Team MilramTeam Milram	s.t.
3	Mathew Hayman (AUS)	Rabobank	s.t.

=== Stage 2 ===
13 March 2007 — Vatan to Limoges, 177 km (110 mi)

	Cyclist	Team	Time
1	Franco Pellizotti (ITA)	Liquigas	3h 57' 36"
2	Daniele Bennati (ITA)	Lampre–Fondital	+ 2"
3	Luca Paolini (ITA)	Liquigas	+ 2"

=== Stage 3 ===
14 March 2007 — Limoges to Maurs, 215.5 km (133.9 mi)

	Cyclist	Team	Time
1	Alexandre Kolobnev (RUS)	Team CSC	4h 59' 35"
2	Tom Boonen (BEL)	Quick-Step–Innergetic	+ 12"
3	Daniele Bennati (ITA)	Lampre–Fondital	+ 12"

=== Stage 4 ===
15 March 2007 — Maurs to Mende, 169.5 km (105.3 mi)

	Cyclist	Team	Time
1	Alberto Contador (ESP)	Discovery Channel	4h 07' 26"
2	Davide Rebellin (ITA)	Gerolsteiner	+ 2"
3	David López (ESP)	Caisse d'Epargne	+ 12"

=== Stage 5 ===
16 March 2007 — Sorgues to Manosque, 178 km (111 mi)

	Cyclist	Team	Time
1	Yaroslav Popovych (UKR)	Discovery Channel	4h 11' 51"
2	Francisco Ventoso (ESP)	Saunier Duval–Prodir	+ 14"
3	Samuel Dumoulin (FRA)	AG2R Prévoyance	+ 14"

=== Stage 6 ===
17 March 2007 — Brignoles to Cannes, 200 km (120 mi)

	Cyclist	Team	Time
1	Luis León Sánchez (ESP)	Caisse d'Epargne	4h 46' 32"
2	Mirco Lorenzetto (ITA)	Team MilramTeam Milram	+ 28"
3	Jérôme Pineau (FRA) Jérôme Pineau	Bouygues Télécom	+ 28"

=== Stage 7 ===
18 March 2007 — Nice, 129.5 km (80.5 mi)

	Cyclist	Team	Time
1	Alberto Contador (ESP)	Discovery Channel	3h 15' 47"
2	David López (ESP)	Caisse d'Epargne	+ 19"
3	Joaquim Rodríguez (ESP)	Caisse d'Epargne	+ 19"

== Final standings ==
=== General classification ===
	Cyclist	Team	Time
1	Alberto Contador (ESP)	Discovery Channel	29h 55' 22"
2	Davide Rebellin (ITA)	Gerolsteiner	+ 26"
3	Luis León Sánchez (ESP)	Caisse d'Epargne	+ 42"
4	Tadej Valjavec (SLO)	Lampre–Fondital	+ 49"
5	Franco Pellizotti (ITA)	Liquigas	+ 57"
6	David López (ESP)	Caisse d'Epargne	+ 1' 00"
7	Cadel Evans (AUS)	Predictor–Lotto	+ 1' 01"
8	Fränk Schleck (LUX)	Team CSC	+ 1' 08"
9	Samuel Sánchez (ESP)	Euskaltel–Euskadi	+ 1' 12"
10	Joaquim Rodríguez (ESP)	Caisse d'Epargne	+ 1' 22"

=== Mountains classification ===
	Cyclist	Team	Points
1	Thomas Voeckler (FRA)	Bouygues Télécom	65
2	Tom Danielson (USA)	Discovery Channel	42
3	Alberto Contador (ESP)	Discovery Channel	36

=== Points classification ===
	Cyclist	Team	Points
1	Franco Pellizotti (ITA)	Liquigas	90
2	Jérôme Pineau (FRA)	Bouygues Télécom	81
3	Davide Rebellin (ITA)	Gerolsteiner	80

=== Best Young Rider ===
	Cyclist	Team	Time
1	Alberto Contador (ESP)	Discovery Channel	29h 55' 22"
2	Luis León Sánchez (ESP)	Caisse d'Epargne	+ 42"
3	Andy Schleck (LUX)	Team CSC	+ 2' 20"

=== Best Team ===
	Team	Country	Time
1	Caisse d'Epargne	Spain	89h 49' 06"
2	Team CSC	Denmark	+ 3' 50"
3	Predictor–Lotto	Belgium	+ 5' 26"

== Jersey progress ==
Stage (Winner)	General Classification	Mountains Classification	Points Classification	Young Rider Classification	Team Classification
Prologue (ITT) (David Millar)	David Millar	no award	David Millar	Roman Kreuziger	Saunier Duval–Prodir
Stage 1 (Jean-Patrick Nazon)	David Millar	Romain Feillu	Daniele Bennati	Roman Kreuziger	Saunier Duval–Prodir
Stage 2 (Franco Pellizotti)	Franco Pellizotti	Stéphane Augé	Daniele Bennati	Roman Kreuziger	Liquigas
Stage 3 (Alexandre Kolobnev)	Franco Pellizotti	Heinrich Haussler	Daniele Bennati	Roman Kreuziger	Liquigas
Stage 4 (Alberto Contador)	Davide Rebellin	Heinrich Haussler	Daniele Bennati	Alberto Contador	Caisse d'Epargne
Stage 5 (Yaroslav Popovych)	Davide Rebellin	Heinrich Haussler	Daniele Bennati	Alberto Contador	Caisse d'Epargne
Stage 6 (Luis León Sánchez)	Davide Rebellin	Thomas Voeckler	Franco Pellizotti	Alberto Contador	Caisse d'Epargne
Stage 7 (Alberto Contador)	Alberto Contador	Thomas Voeckler	Franco Pellizotti	Alberto Contador	Caisse d'Epargne
