= 2012 Clásica de San Sebastián =

2012 UCI World Tour, race 21 of 28

Race details
- Dates: 14 August 2012
- Stages: 1
- Distance: 234 km (145.4 mi)
- Winning time: 5h 55' 34"

Results
| | Winner | Luis León Sánchez (Spain) | (Rabobank) |
| | Second | Simon Gerrans (Australia) | (Orica–GreenEDGE) |
| | Third | Gianni Meersman (Belgium) | (Lotto–Belisol) |

The 2012 Clásica de San Sebastián was the 32nd edition of the Clásica de San Sebastián, a single-day cycling race. It was held on 14 August 2012, over a distance of 234 km (145.4 mi), starting and finishing in San Sebastián, in the Basque Country, Spain. It was the twenty-first event of the 2012 UCI World Tour season.

The race was won for the second time in three years by Rabobank rider Luis León Sánchez after making a late-race attack on the descent from the Alto de Arkale. Second place went to Orica–GreenEDGE's Simon Gerrans, while Gianni Meersman rounded out the podium placings for Lotto–Belisol.

== Teams ==
As the Clásica de San Sebastián was a UCI World Tour event, all 18 UCI ProTeams were invited automatically and obligated to send a squad. Two other squads – Andalucía and Caja Rural – were given wildcard places into the race, and as such, formed the event's 20-team peloton.

The 20 teams that competed in the race were:

- Ag2r–La Mondiale
- Andalucía
- Astana
- BMC Racing Team
- Caja Rural
- Euskaltel–Euskadi
- FDJ–BigMat
- Garmin–Sharp
- Team Katusha
- Lampre–ISD
- Liquigas–Cannondale
- Lotto–Belisol
- Movistar Team
- Omega Pharma–Quick-Step
- Orica–GreenEDGE
- Rabobank
- RadioShack–Nissan
- Saxo Bank–Tinkoff Bank
- Team Sky
- Vacansoleil–DCM

== Results ==
| | Cyclist | Team | Time | UCI World Tour Points |
|---|---|---|---|---|
| 1 | Luis León Sánchez (ESP) | Rabobank | 5h 55' 34" | 80 |
| 2 | Simon Gerrans (AUS) | Orica–GreenEDGE | + 7" | 60 |
| 3 | Gianni Meersman (BEL) | Lotto–Belisol | + 7" | 50 |
| 4 | Christophe Le Mével (FRA) | Garmin–Sharp | + 7" | 40 |
| 5 | Bauke Mollema (NED) | Rabobank | + 7" | 30 |
| 6 | Mauro Santambrogio (ITA) | BMC Racing Team | + 7" | 22 |
| 7 | Mads Christensen (DEN) | Saxo Bank–Tinkoff Bank | + 7" | 14 |
| 8 | Joaquim Rodríguez (ESP) | Team Katusha | + 7" | 10 |
| 9 | Xavier Florencio (ESP) | Team Katusha | + 7" | 6 |
| 10 | Diego Ulissi (ITA) | Lampre–ISD | + 7" | 2 |
