= Antonio Colóm =

Spanish cyclist (born 1978)

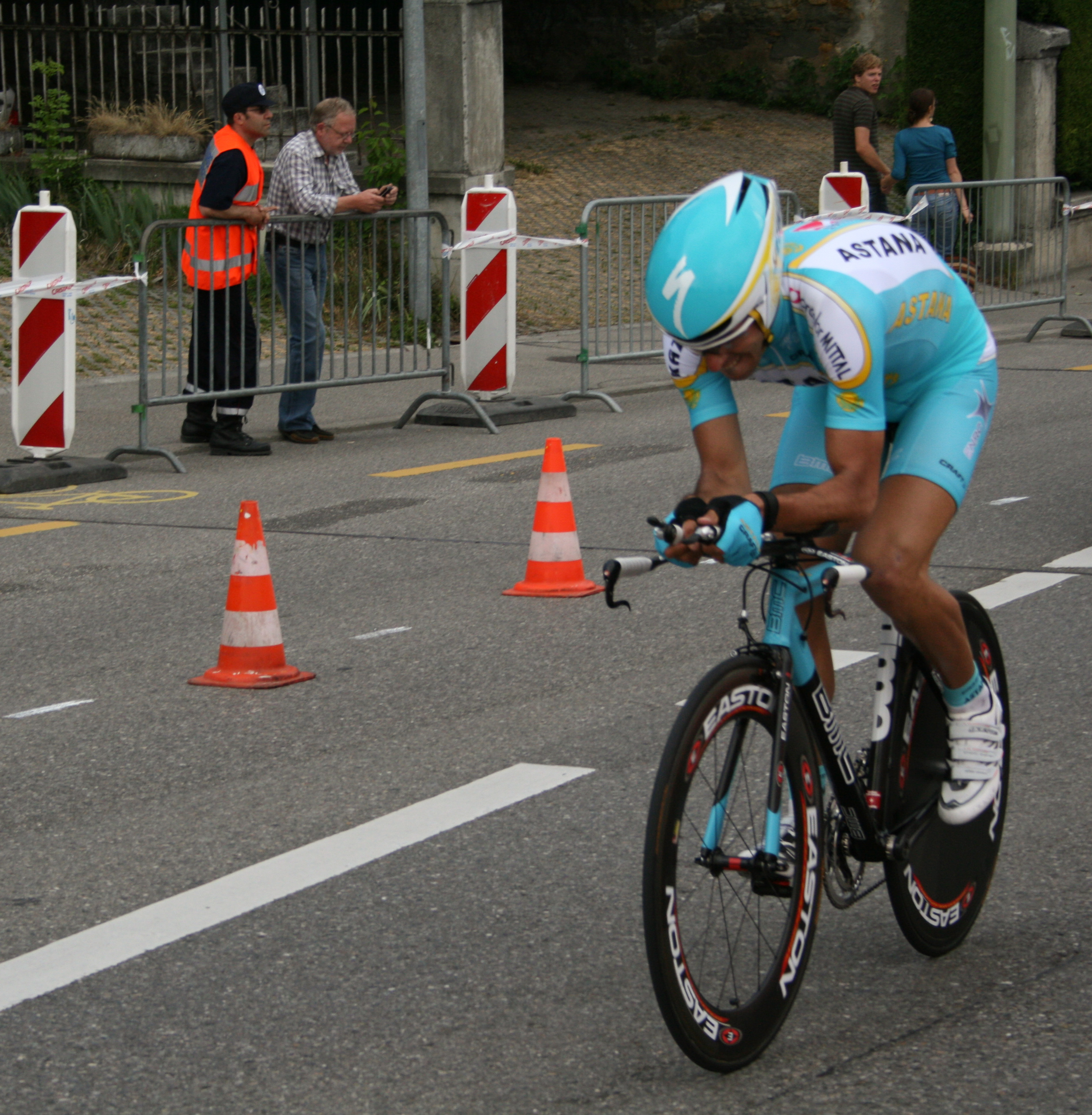

Personal information
- Full name: Antonio Colóm Mas
- Nickname: Toniette
- Born: 11 May 1978 (age 48) Bunyola, Spain
- Height: 1.83 m (6 ft 0 in)
- Weight: 71 kg (157 lb)

Cycling career
- Sport: Cycling
- Discipline: Road
- Role: Rider

Professional teams
- 1999–2001: Costa de Almería
- 2002–2003: Colchon Relax
- 2004–2006: Illes Balears–Banesto
- 2007–2008: Astana
- 2009: Team Katusha

Major wins
- Volta a la Comunitat Valenciana (2006); Vuelta a Mallorca (2004); Vuelta a Andalucía (2002)

Antonio Colóm Mas (born 11 May 1978) is a Spanish professional road bicycle racer from Bunyola. He is a specialist in short stage races, having won the Volta a la Comunitat Valenciana in 2006, the Vuelta a Mallorca in 2004 and the Vuelta a Andalucía in 2002.

== Career ==
Colóm began his career at Costa de Almería in 1999 and stayed there for three seasons, in which time he built a growing reputation as a climber, winning the mountains classification of the Setmana Catalana de Ciclisme in 2001. In 2002, Colóm moved to Relax, and it was here that he had an early breakthrough in winning the Vuelta a Andalucía. Colóm moved to the division one team Illes Balears-Banesto in 2004 and once again saw early success, winning the Vuelta a Mallorca. A second placing in the Volta a la Comunitat Valenciana rounded out a successful season. In 2005, Colóm once again saw success in Mallorca, winning the Trofeo Calvià. In 2006, Colóm reversed his 2004 results: placing second overall in the Vuelta a Mallorca and winning the Volta a la Comunitat Valenciana.

In 2007, Colom moved to Astana Pro Team, and once again showed well in Mallorca, winning the Trofeo Sóller. His 2008 campaign was poor, but got back to winning ways at the start of the 2009 season as he took one stage and the overall win in his "home race" with his new Team Katusha outfit.

On 9 June 2009 it was announced that he had been provisionally suspended from racing following a positive drug test. On 27 May 2010 the Spanish Cycling Federation suspended him for 2 years, effective 2 April 2009, declaring his results in the 2009 Vuelta al País Vasco void, but making him eligible to return to cycling on 2 April 2011.

In July 2014, Colom, competing as an amateur, won the 35-39 male age group at Ironman Frankfurt qualifying himself to compete at the 2014 Ironman World Championship in Hawai'i.

== Major results ==
1999 – Amica Chips–Costa de Almería
2000 – Costa de Almería
2001 – Jazztel–Costa de Almería
Setmana Catalana de Ciclisme – Mountain competition winner
2002 – Relax–Fuenlabrada
Vuelta a Andalucía
2003 – Colchon Relax–Fuenlabrada
2004 – Illes Balears–Banesto
Vuelta a Mallorca – overall winner
Volta a la Comunitat Valenciana

2nd overall
Combination competition – winner
Stage 1 – winner

2005 – Illes Balears–Banesto
Trofeo Calvià
2006 – Caisse d'Epargne–Illes Balears
Volta a la Comunitat Valenciana

Overall winner
Stage 4 winner

Vuelta a Mallorca – 2nd
2007 – Astana
Trofeo Sóller
Critérium du Dauphiné Libéré

Stage 5 winner

2009 – Team Katusha
Vuelta a Mallorca
Trofeo Sóller
Stage 3, Volta ao Algarve
Stage 8, Paris–Nice
~~2nd, Vuelta al País Vasco~~
