= 2007 Critérium du Dauphiné Libéré =

2007 UCI ProTour, race 14 of 26
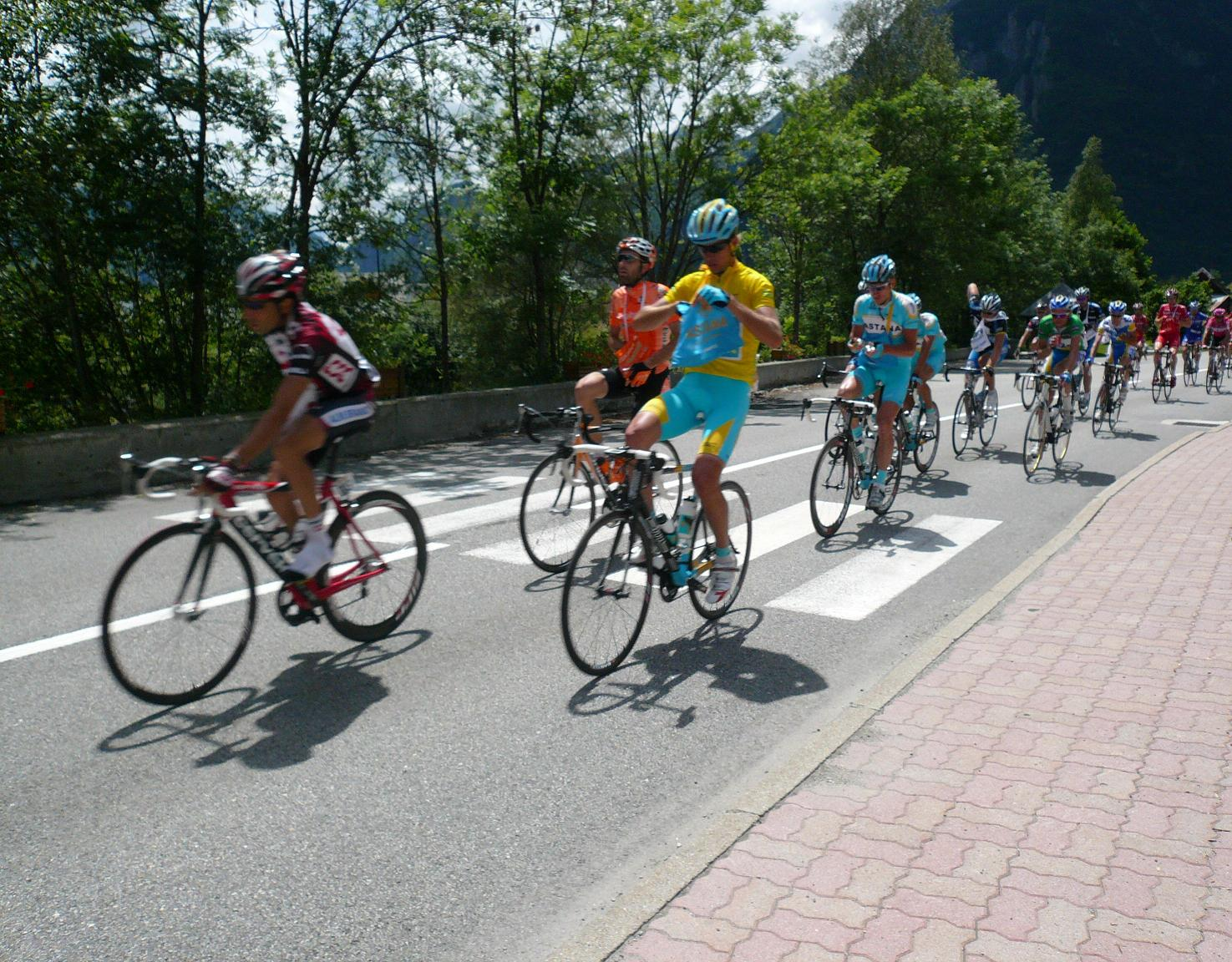
- The peloton at the feeding zone in Allemond, during Stage 6, with Andrey Kashechkin in the race leader's yellow jersey

Race details
- Dates: 10–17 June 2007
- Stages: 7 + Prologue
- Winning time: 29h 50' 35"

Results
Jersey awarded to the overall winner	Winner	Christophe Moreau (FRA)	(AG2R Prévoyance)
	Second	Cadel Evans (AUS)	(Predictor–Lotto)
	Third	Andrey Kashechkin (KAZ)	(Astana)
Jersey awarded to the points classification winner	Points	Alexander Vinokourov (KAZ)	(Astana)
Jersey awarded to the mountains classification winner	Mountains	Rémy Di Gregorio (FRA)	(Française des Jeux)
Jersey awarded to the combination classification winner	Combination	Christophe Moreau (FRA)	(AG2R Prévoyance)
	Team	Astana	

The 2007 Critérium du Dauphiné Libéré was the 59th edition of the Critérium du Dauphiné Libéré cycle race and was held from 10 June to 17 June 2007. The race consisted of a Prologue and seven stages, of which one was a time trial, covering a total of about 1,140 km (710 mi), starting in Grenoble and finishing in Annecy.

== Teams ==
Nineteen teams, each with a maximum of eight riders, entered the race:

- Discovery Channel
- AG2R Prévoyance
- Gerolsteiner
- Rabobank
- Caisse d'Epargne
- Saunier Duval–Prodir
- Crédit Agricole
- Astana
- Cofidis
- Predictor–Lotto
- Team CSC
- Française des Jeux
- T-Mobile Team
- Liquigas
- Euskaltel–Euskadi
- Quick-Step–Innergetic
- Lampre–Fondital
- Bouygues Télécom
- Team Milram

== Pre-race favourites ==
The race was important preparation for the Tour de France. Of top names, defending champion Levi Leipheimer, Alejandro Valverde, Óscar Pereiro, Denis Menchov and Alexander Vinokourov were in the race while Thor Hushovd and Tom Boonen head the sprinters' group.

== Route ==
Stage characteristics and winners
Stage	Date	Course	Distance	Type	Winner
P	10 June	Grenoble	4.2 km (2.6 mi)	Individual time trial	Bradley Wiggins (GBR)
1	11 June	Grenoble to Roanne	219 km (136 mi)		Heinrich Haussler (GER)
2	12 June	Saint-Paul-en-Jarez to Saint-Étienne	157 km (98 mi)		Christophe Moreau (FRA)
3	13 June	Anneyron to Anneyron	40.7 km (25.3 mi)	Individual time trial	Alexander Vinokourov (KAZ)
4	14 June	Hauterives to Mont Ventoux	197 km (122 mi)		Christophe Moreau (FRA)
5	15 June	Nyons to Digne-les-Bains	195 km (121 mi)		Antonio Colom (ESP)
6	16 June	Gap to Valloire	198 km (123 mi)		Maxim Iglinsky (KAZ)
7	17 June	Valloire to Annecy	129 km (80 mi)		Alexander Vinokourov (KAZ)

== Stages ==
The first, second and third placed riders, of each stage, were given 3, 2 and 1 UCI ProTour points, respectively.

=== Prologue ===
10 June 2008 - Grenoble, 4.2 km (2.6 mi) (ITT)

Prologue Result and General Classification after Prologue

Rank	Rider	Team	Time
1	Bradley Wiggins (GBR)	Cofidis	4' 50"
2	Levi Leipheimer (USA)	Discovery Channel	+ 1"
3	Andrey Kashechkin (KAZ)	Astana	+ 2"
4	George Hincapie (USA)	Discovery Channel	+ 2"
5	Alejandro Valverde (ESP)	Caisse d'Epargne	+ 3"

=== Stage 1 ===
11 June 2008 - Grenoble to Roanne, 219 km (136 mi)

Stage 1 Result

Rank	Rider	Team	Time
1	Heinrich Haussler (GER)	Gerolsteiner	5h 35' 05"
2	Tom Boonen (BEL)	Quick-Step–Innergetic	s.t.
3	Graeme Brown (AUS)	Rabobank	s.t.
4	Sébastien Chavanel (FRA)	Française des Jeux	s.t.
5	André Greipel (GER)	T-Mobile Team	s.t.

General Classification after Stage 1

Rank	Rider	Team	Time
1	Bradley Wiggins (GBR)	Cofidis	5h 39' 55"
2	Levi Leipheimer (USA)	Discovery Channel	+ 1"
3	Andrey Kashechkin (KAZ)	Astana	+ 2"
4	George Hincapie (USA)	Discovery Channel	+ 2"
5	Alejandro Valverde (ESP)	Caisse d'Epargne	+ 3"

=== Stage 2 ===
12 June 2008 - Saint-Paul-en-Jarez to Saint-Étienne, 157 km (98 mi)

Stage 2 Result

Rank	Rider	Team	Time
1	Christophe Moreau (FRA)	AG2R Prévoyance	3h 50' 38"
2	José Antonio Redondo (ESP)	Astana	s.t.
3	Alejandro Valverde (ESP)	Caisse d'Epargne	+ 33"
4	Thor Hushovd (NOR)	Crédit Agricole	+ 33"
5	Heinrich Haussler (GER)	Gerolsteiner	+ 33"

General Classification after Stage 2

Rank	Rider	Team	Time
1	Christophe Moreau (FRA)	AG2R Prévoyance	9h 30' 42"
2	José Antonio Redondo (ESP)	Astana	+ 7"
3	Bradley Wiggins (GBR)	Cofidis	+ 24"
4	George Hincapie (USA)	Discovery Channel	+ 25"
5	Andrey Kashechkin (KAZ)	Astana	+ 26"

=== Stage 3 ===
13 June 2008 - Anneyron, 40.7 km (25.3 mi) (ITT)

Stage 3 Result

Rank	Rider	Team	Time
1	Alexander Vinokourov (KAZ)	Astana	52' 08"
2	Andrey Kashechkin (KAZ)	Astana	+ 9"
3	David Zabriskie (USA)	Team CSC	+ 38"
4	Cadel Evans (AUS)	Predictor–Lotto	+ 39"
5	Denis Menchov (RUS)	Rabobank	+ 40"

General Classification after Stage 3

Rank	Rider	Team	Time
1	Alexander Vinokourov (KAZ)	Astana	10h 23' 23"
2	Andrey Kashechkin (KAZ)	Astana	+ 2"
3	David Zabriskie (USA)	Team CSC	+ 32"
4	Denis Menchov (RUS)	Rabobank	+ 40"
5	Cadel Evans (AUS)	Predictor–Lotto	+ 41"

=== Stage 4 ===
14 June 2008 - Hauterives to Le Mont-Ventoux, 197 km (122 mi)

Stage 4 Result

Rank	Rider	Team	Time
1	Christophe Moreau (FRA)	AG2R Prévoyance	5h 51' 52"
2	Sylvester Szmyd (POL)	Lampre–Fondital	+ 1' 08"
3	Igor Antón (ESP)	Euskaltel–Euskadi	+ 1' 21"
4	Cadel Evans (AUS)	Predictor–Lotto	+ 1' 51"
5	Denis Menchov (RUS)	Rabobank	+ 1' 51"

General Classification after Stage 4

Rank	Rider	Team	Time
1	Andrey Kashechkin (KAZ)	Astana	16h 17' 21"
2	Christophe Moreau (FRA)	AG2R Prévoyance	+ 14"
3	Denis Menchov (RUS)	Rabobank	+ 25"
4	Cadel Evans (AUS)	Predictor–Lotto	+ 26"
5	David Zabriskie (USA)	Team CSC	+ 26"

=== Stage 5 ===
15 June 2008 - Nyons to Digne-les-Bains, 195 km (121 mi)

Stage 5 Result

Rank	Rider	Team	Time
1	Antonio Colom (ESP)	Astana	4h 39' 28"
2	Alexander Vinokourov (KAZ)	Astana	s.t.
3	Leonardo Duque (COL)	Cofidis	+ 15"
4	Matej Mugerli (SLO)	Liquigas	+ 15"
5	Stef Clement (NED)	Bouygues Télécom	+ 15"

General Classification after Stage 5

Rank	Rider	Team	Time
1	Andrey Kashechkin (KAZ)	Astana	21h 00' 16"
2	Christophe Moreau (FRA)	AG2R Prévoyance	+ 14"
3	Denis Menchov (RUS)	Rabobank	+ 25"
4	Cadel Evans (AUS)	Predictor–Lotto	+ 26"
5	David Zabriskie (USA)	Team CSC	+ 26"

=== Stage 6 ===
16 June 2008 - Gap to Valloire, 198 km (123 mi)

Stage 6 Result

Rank	Rider	Team	Time
1	Maxim Iglinsky (KAZ)	Astana	5h 51' 32"
2	Alexander Bocharov (RUS)	Crédit Agricole	+ 51"
3	Pierrick Fédrigo (FRA)	Bouygues Télécom	+ 51"
4	Rémy Di Gregorio (FRA)	Française des Jeux	+ 51"
5	Egoi Martínez (ESP)	Discovery Channel	+ 2' 16"

General Classification after Stage 6

Rank	Rider	Team	Time
1	Christophe Moreau (FRA)	AG2R Prévoyance	26h 54' 25"
2	Cadel Evans (AUS)	Predictor–Lotto	+ 14"
3	Andrey Kashechkin (KAZ)	Astana	+ 1' 27"
4	Denis Menchov (RUS)	Rabobank	+ 1' 52"
5	David Zabriskie (USA)	Team CSC	+ 2' 16"

=== Stage 7 ===
17 June 2008 - Valloire to Annecy, 129 km (80 mi)

Stage 7 Result

Rank	Rider	Team	Time
1	Alexander Vinokourov (KAZ)	Astana	2h 55' 34"
2	Óscar Pereiro (ESP)	Caisse d'Epargne	+ 37"
3	Cadel Evans (AUS)	Predictor–Lotto	+ 37"
4	Denis Menchov (RUS)	Rabobank	+ 37"
5	Tadej Valjavec (SLO)	Lampre–Fondital	+ 37"

General Classification after Stage 7

Rank	Rider	Team	Time
1	Christophe Moreau (FRA)	AG2R Prévoyance	29h 50' 35"
2	Cadel Evans (AUS)	Predictor–Lotto	+ 14"
3	Andrey Kashechkin (KAZ)	Astana	+ 1' 27"
4	Denis Menchov (RUS)	Rabobank	+ 1' 52"
5	David Zabriskie (USA)	Team CSC	+ 2' 16"

== General Classification ==
Rank	Rider	Team	Time	UCI ProTour Points
1	Christophe Moreau (FRA)	AG2R Prévoyance	29h 50' 35"	50
2	Cadel Evans (AUS)	Predictor–Lotto	+ 14"	40
3	Andrey Kashechkin (KAZ)	Astana	+ 1' 27"	35
4	Denis Menchov (RUS)	Rabobank	+ 1' 52"	30
5	David Zabriskie (USA)	Team CSC	+ 2' 16"	25
6	Alberto Contador (ESP)	Discovery Channel	+ 4' 24"	20
7	Mikel Astarloza (ESP)	Euskaltel–Euskadi	+ 5' 00"	15
8	Manuel Beltrán (ESP)	Liquigas	+ 5' 01"	10
9	Tadej Valjavec (SLO)	Lampre–Fondital	+ 5' 17"	5
10	Sylvain Chavanel (FRA)	Cofidis	+ 5' 38"	2

== Jersey progress ==
Stage (Winner)	General classification	Mountains classification	Points classification	Combination classification	Team Classification
Prologue (Bradley Wiggins)	Bradley Wiggins	Sylvain Chavanel	Bradley Wiggins	Bradley Wiggins	no award
Stage 1 (Heinrich Haussler)	Bradley Wiggins	Sylvain Chavanel	Tom Boonen	Bradley Wiggins	Discovery Channel
Stage 2 (Christophe Moreau)	Christophe Moreau	Sylvain Chavanel	Heinrich Haussler	Christophe Moreau	Astana
Stage 3 (Alexander Vinokourov)	Alexander Vinokourov	Sylvain Chavanel	Heinrich Haussler	Andrey Kashechkin	Astana
Stage 4 (Christophe Moreau)	Andrey Kashechkin	Christophe Moreau	Christophe Moreau	Christophe Moreau	Team CSC
Stage 5 (Antonio Colom)	Andrey Kashechkin	Christophe Moreau	Christophe Moreau	Christophe Moreau	Discovery Channel
Stage 6 (Maxim Iglinsky)	Christophe Moreau	Rémy Di Gregorio	Christophe Moreau	Christophe Moreau	Discovery Channel
Stage 7 (Final) (Alexander Vinokourov)	Christophe Moreau	Rémy Di Gregorio	Alexander Vinokourov	Christophe Moreau	Astana
