= 2013 Belkin Pro Cycling season =

Sporting Event

2013 Belkin Pro Cycling season
Manager	Richard Plugge
One-day victories	5
Stage race overall victories	5
Stage race stage victories	29
Previous season • Next season

The 2013 season for the Belkin Pro Cycling team began in January at the Tour Down Under. As a UCI ProTeam, they were automatically invited and obligated to send a squad to every event in the UCI World Tour.

Having lost the sponsorship of Rabobank after seventeen years in the sport, the team were able to compete during the 2013 season due to Rabobank funding. As a result, the team ran as the Blanco Pro Cycling team for the first half of the season. Prior to the Tour de France, it was announced that Belkin, an American manufacturer of consumer electronics, acquired title sponsorship of the team in a 2 1/2-year deal.

== 2013 roster ==
As of 9 September 2013.

Rider	Date of birth
Jack Bobridge (AUS)	13 July 1989 (age 35)
Jetse Bol (NED)	8 September 1989 (age 35)
Lars Boom (NED)	30 December 1985 (age 39)
Theo Bos (NED)	22 August 1983 (age 41)
Graeme Brown (AUS)	9 April 1979 (age 45)
Stef Clement (NED)	24 September 1982 (age 42)
Rick Flens (NED)	11 April 1983 (age 41)
Juan Manuel Gárate (ESP)	24 April 1976 (age 48)
Robert Gesink (NED)	31 May 1986 (age 38)
Marc Goos (NED)	30 November 1990 (age 34)
Moreno Hofland (NED)	31 August 1991 (age 33)
Wilco Kelderman (NED)	25 March 1991 (age 33)
Steven Kruijswijk (NED)	7 June 1987 (age 37)
Tom Leezer (NED)	26 December 1985 (age 39)
Paul Martens (GER)	26 October 1983 (age 41)

Rider	Date of birth
Bauke Mollema (NED)	26 November 1986 (age 38)
Lars Petter Nordhaug (NOR)	14 May 1984 (age 40)
Mark Renshaw (AUS)	22 October 1982 (age 42)
Luis León Sánchez (ESP)	24 November 1983 (age 41)
Tom-Jelte Slagter (NED)	1 July 1989 (age 35)
Ivar Slik (Note: Slik joined the team on 15 August as a stagiaire, from the Rabobank Development Team.) (NED)	27 May 1993 (age 31)
Bram Tankink (NED)	3 December 1978 (age 46)
David Tanner (AUS)	30 September 1984 (age 40)
Laurens ten Dam (NED)	13 November 1980 (age 44)
Maarten Tjallingii (NED)	5 November 1977 (age 47)
Jos van Emden (NED)	27 June 1987 (age 37)
Dennis van Winden (NED)	2 December 1987 (age 37)
Sep Vanmarcke (BEL)	28 July 1988 (age 36)
Robert Wagner (GER)	17 April 1983 (age 41)
Maarten Wynants (BEL)	13 May 1982 (age 42)

Riders who joined the team for the 2013 season

Rider	2012 team
Jack Bobridge	Orica–GreenEDGE
Marc Goos	Rabobank Continental Team
Moreno Hofland	Rabobank Continental Team
Lars Petter Nordhaug	Team Sky
David Tanner	Saxo Bank–Tinkoff Bank
Sep Vanmarcke	Garmin–Sharp
Robert Wagner	RadioShack–Nissan

Riders who left the team during or after the 2012 season

Rider	2013 team
Carlos Barredo	Retired
Matti Breschel	Saxo–Tinkoff
Michael Matthews	Orica–GreenEDGE
Grischa Niermann	Retired
Coen Vermeltfoort	Cycling Team De Rijke–Shanks

== Season victories ==
Date	Race	Competition	Rider	Country	Location
24 January	Tour Down Under, Stage 3	UCI World Tour	Tom-Jelte Slagter (NED)	Australia	Stirling
27 January	Tour Down Under, Overall	UCI World Tour	Tom-Jelte Slagter (NED)	Australia	
27 January	Tour Down Under, Young rider classification	UCI World Tour	Tom-Jelte Slagter (NED)	Australia	
7 February	Tour Méditerranéen, Stage 2	UCI Europe Tour	Lars Boom (NED)	France	Sète
14 February	Volta ao Algarve, Stage 1	UCI Europe Tour	Paul Martens (GER)	Portugal	Albufeira
15 February	Volta ao Algarve, Stage 2	UCI Europe Tour	Theo Bos (NED)	Portugal	Lagoa
17 February	Tour du Haut Var, Stage 2	UCI Europe Tour	Lars Boom (NED)	France	Draguignan
21 February	Tour de Langkawi, Stage 1	UCI Asia Tour	Theo Bos (NED)	Malaysia	Kulim
22 February	Tour de Langkawi, Stage 2	UCI Asia Tour	Theo Bos (NED)	Malaysia	Kuala Kangsar
24 February	Clásica de Almería	UCI Europe Tour	Mark Renshaw (AUS)	Spain	Almería
26 February	Tour de Langkawi, Stage 6	UCI Asia Tour	Tom Leezer (NED)	Malaysia	Kuantan
23 March	Critérium International, Stage 1	UCI Europe Tour	Theo Bos (NED)	France	Porto-Vecchio
28 April	Tour de Romandie, Young rider classification	UCI World Tour	Wilco Kelderman (NED)	Switzerland	
17 May	Glava Tour of Norway, Stage 3	UCI Europe Tour	Theo Bos (NED)	Norway	Drammen
26 May	Tour of Belgium, Stage 5	UCI Europe Tour	Luis León Sánchez (ESP)	Belgium	Banneux
2 June	Grote Prijs Wase Polders	National event	Sep Vanmarcke (BEL)	Belgium	Verrebroek
9 June	Tour de Suisse, Stage 2	UCI World Tour	Bauke Mollema (NED)	Switzerland	Crans-Montana
12 June	Ster ZLM Toer, Stage 1	UCI Europe Tour	Robert Wagner (GER)	Netherlands	Goes
13 June	Ster ZLM Toer, Stage 2	UCI Europe Tour	Theo Bos (NED)	Netherlands	Breda
15 June	Ster ZLM Toer, Stage 4	UCI Europe Tour	Lars Boom (NED)	Belgium	La Gileppe-Jalhay
16 June	Ster ZLM Toer, Overall	UCI Europe Tour	Lars Boom (NED)	Netherlands	
16 June	Tour de Luxembourg, Overall	UCI Europe Tour	Paul Martens (GER)	Luxembourg	
16 June	Tour de Luxembourg, Teams classification	UCI Europe Tour	(Note: The riders on the squad were Paul Martens, Robert Gesink, Dennis van Winden, Moreno Hofland, Maarten Wynants, Laurens ten Dam and Maarten Tjallingii)	Luxembourg	
3 August	Danmark Rundt, Stage 5	UCI Europe Tour	Wilco Kelderman (NED)	Denmark	Holbæk
4 August	Danmark Rundt, Overall	UCI Europe Tour	Wilco Kelderman (NED)	Denmark	
4 August	Danmark Rundt, Points classification	UCI Europe Tour	Wilco Kelderman (NED)	Denmark	
4 August	Danmark Rundt, Young rider classification	UCI Europe Tour	Wilco Kelderman (NED)	Denmark	
11 August	Arctic Race of Norway, Mountains classification	UCI Europe Tour	Lars Petter Nordhaug (NOR)	Norway	
12 August	Tour de l'Ain, Stage 3	UCI Europe Tour	Luis León Sánchez (ESP)	France	Lélex–Monts Jura
12 August	Eneco Tour, Stage 1	UCI World Tour	Mark Renshaw (AUS)	Belgium	Ardooie
13 August	Tour de l'Ain, Teams classification	UCI Europe Tour	(Note: The riders on the squad were Stef Clement, Juan Manuel Gárate, Marc Goos, Steven Kruijswijk, Luis León Sánchez and Tom-Jelte Slagter)	France	
18 August	Eneco Tour, Points classification	UCI World Tour	Lars Boom (NED)	(Note: Race held in Belgium and the Netherlands.)	
31 August	World Ports Classic, Stage 2	UCI Europe Tour	Maarten Tjallingii (NED)	Belgium	Antwerp
8 September	Tour of Alberta, Mountains classification	UCI America Tour	Tom-Jelte Slagter (NED)	Canada	
11 September	Vuelta a España, Stage 17	UCI World Tour	Bauke Mollema (NED)	Spain	Burgos
13 September	Grand Prix Cycliste de Québec	UCI World Tour	Robert Gesink (NED)	Canada	Quebec City
21 September	GP Impanis-Van Petegem	UCI Europe Tour	Sep Vanmarcke (BEL)	Belgium	Haacht
3 October	Münsterland Giro	UCI Europe Tour	Jos van Emden (NED)	Germany	Münster
20 October	Tour of Hainan, Stage 1	UCI Asia Tour	Moreno Hofland (NED)	China	Chengmai
21 October	Tour of Hainan, Stage 2	UCI Asia Tour	Theo Bos (NED)	China	Haikou
22 October	Tour of Hainan, Stage 3	UCI Asia Tour	Theo Bos (NED)	China	Qionghai
23 October	Tour of Hainan, Stage 4	UCI Asia Tour	Theo Bos (NED)	China	Xinglong–Wanning
24 October	Tour of Hainan, Stage 5	UCI Asia Tour	Theo Bos (NED)	China	Sanya
25 October	Tour of Hainan, Stage 6	UCI Asia Tour	Moreno Hofland (NED)	China	Wuzhishan
26 October	Tour of Hainan, Stage 7	UCI Asia Tour	Theo Bos (NED)	China	Dongfang
27 October	Tour of Hainan, Stage 8	UCI Asia Tour	Moreno Hofland (NED)	China	Danzhou
28 October	Tour of Hainan, Stage 9	UCI Asia Tour	Theo Bos (NED)	China	Chengmai
28 October	Tour of Hainan, Overall	UCI Asia Tour	Moreno Hofland (NED)	China	
28 October	Tour of Hainan, Points classification	UCI Asia Tour	Moreno Hofland (NED)	China	
28 October	Tour of Hainan, Teams classification	UCI Asia Tour	(Note: The riders on the squad were Lars Boom, Theo Bos, Jos van Emden, Moreno Hofland, Tom Leezer, Dennis van Winden and Marc Goos)	China	
