= 2011 Rabobank season =

Dutch cycling team season

2011 Rabobank season
Manager	Erik Breukink
One-day victories	4
Stage race overall victories	2
Stage race stage victories	18
Previous season • Next season

The 2011 season for the Rabobank cycling team began in January at the Tour Down Under and ended in October with Michael Matthews' participation in the Noosa Grand Prix. As a UCI ProTeam, they were automatically invited and obligated to send a squad to every event in the UCI World Tour.

The team had 24 victories in 2011, including stage wins at each Grand Tour. Pieter Weening held the race leader's pink jersey at the Giro d'Italia for four days, and Bauke Mollema also won the points jersey at the Vuelta a España, without winning any stage. No rider was especially more prolific than any other – Michael Matthews, Lars Boom, Robert Gesink, and Theo Bos each had multiple wins. Their most successful individual race was the Tour of Oman, where they took four stage wins, the overall crown, and the youth classification. The team took victories in every month of the season except October.

== 2011 roster ==
Ages as of January 1, 2011

Rider	Date of birth
Carlos Barredo (ESP)	June 5, 1981 (aged 29)
Jetse Bol (Note: Rider joined the team on August 1 as a stagiaire.) (NED)	September 8, 1989 (aged 21)
Lars Boom (NED)	December 30, 1985 (aged 25)
Theo Bos (NED)	August 22, 1983 (aged 27)
Matti Breschel (DEN)	August 31, 1984 (aged 26)
Graeme Brown (AUS)	April 9, 1979 (aged 31)
Stef Clement (NED)	September 24, 1982 (aged 28)
Rick Flens (NED)	April 11, 1983 (aged 27)
Óscar Freire (ESP)	February 15, 1976 (aged 34)
Juan Manuel Gárate (ESP)	April 24, 1976 (aged 34)
Robert Gesink (NED)	May 31, 1986 (aged 24)
Marc Goos (NED)	November 30, 1990 (aged 20)
Steven Kruijswijk (NED)	June 7, 1987 (aged 23)
Sebastian Langeveld (NED)	January 17, 1985 (aged 25)

Rider	Date of birth
Tom Leezer (NED)	December 26, 1985 (aged 25)
Paul Martens (GER)	October 26, 1983 (aged 27)
Michael Matthews (AUS)	September 26, 1990 (aged 20)
Bauke Mollema (NED)	November 26, 1986 (aged 24)
Grischa Niermann (GER)	November 3, 1975 (aged 35)
Luis León Sánchez (ESP)	November 24, 1983 (aged 27)
Tom-Jelte Slagter (NED)	July 1, 1989 (aged 21)
Bram Tankink (NED)	December 3, 1978 (aged 32)
Laurens ten Dam (NED)	November 13, 1980 (aged 30)
Maarten Tjallingii (NED)	November 5, 1977 (aged 33)
Jos van Emden (NED)	June 27, 1987 (aged 23)
Dennis van Winden (NED)	December 2, 1987 (aged 23)
Coen Vermeltfoort (NED)	April 11, 1988 (aged 22)
Pieter Weening (NED)	April 5, 1981 (aged 29)
Maarten Wynants (BEL)	May 13, 1982 (aged 28)

Riders who joined the team for the 2011 season

Rider	2010 team
Carlos Barredo	Quick-Step
Theo Bos	Cervélo TestTeam
Matti Breschel	Team Saxo Bank
Michael Matthews	neo-pro
Luis León Sánchez	Caisse d'Epargne
Tom-Jelte Slagter	Rabobank continental team
Coen Vermeltfoort	Rabobank continental team
Maarten Wynants	Quick-Step

Riders who left the team during or after the 2010 season

Rider	2011 team
Mauricio Ardila	Geox–TMC
Dmitriy Kozontchuk	Geox–TMC
Denis Menchov	Geox–TMC
Koos Moerenhout	Retired
Nick Nuyens	Saxo Bank–SunGard
Joost Posthuma	Leopard Trek
Kai Reus	Cycling Team De Rijke
Tom Stamsnijder	Leopard Trek

== One-day races ==
=== Spring classics ===
In the days leading up to the spring season's traditional opener, Omloop Het Nieuwsblad, there was talk that many teams in the race would protest the UCI's ban on two-way radios in all races ranked 1.HC, 2.HC, and below. Rabobank, and in particular team manager Breukink, are among the ban's most vocal opponents, and they were at the forefront of the planned protest, promising to take the start with earpieces in place. It subsequently emerged that the planned protest would result in the UCI withdrawing its officials just as they had at the Trofeo Palma de Mallorca earlier in the season, and nullify any results. This would result in the race's insurance policies being voided and quite possibly cause the race to be canceled altogether. The teams decided on a majority vote to cancel the protest and race without radios, while promising to carry the protest to other races. In a remarkable irony, a Rabobank rider won the race – Langeveld won a two-man sprint over defending champion Juan Antonio Flecha by a matter of centimeters.

The team got a strong result at the season's third monument classic, Paris–Roubaix. After an aggressive first two hour of racing that covered the near 100 km (62 mi) before the first cobbled sector, Tjallingii worked his way into a ten-man escape group. After the Arenberg sector, the lead group had swelled to 21 riders. Little by little, the reverse occurred as the speed increased. Tjallingii stayed at the front of the race until Garmin–Cervélo's Johan Vansummeren put in a solo attack 15 km (9.3 mi) from the finish line, and was not seen again, staying out front for victory. From the group behind, Fabian Cancellara put in his most intensive dig at that point and caught every remaining member of the breakaway group (save for Vansummeren). Tjallingii stayed with him, and they along with Team RadioShack's Grégory Rast contested the sprint for second place. Cancellara finished second, and Tjallingii third ahead of Rast. Tjallingii called the result the "greatest day ever" in his career, and was ecstatic that he had made the podium and had not slipped to fourth place.

Ambitious as always to win the most prestigious race of the season held in the Netherlands, the Amstel Gold Race, the team sent a strong squad including Gesink, Freire, Sánchez, Tankink, and Tjallingii. They were noted, however, to be underdogs to defending race champion Philippe Gilbert. The team rode a solid race, as they effectively left the job of chasing down breakaways to Team Katusha and Gilbert's team Omega Pharma–Lotto, with even Gilbert himself pulling to help chase down Andy Schleck in the final kilometers. Gesink, Freire, and Sánchez all sat on wheels and stayed with the front group for the majority of the race. Sánchez tried a solo attack for victory, but was chased down by Damiano Cunego and Stijn Devolder. In the end, Gilbert rode away from the field on the short uphill finish, securing the repeat victory. Rabobank did, however, place three finishers in the top ten, and were the only team to do so. These were Freire in sixth, Gesink in ninth, and Martens in tenth. Martens turned in decent rides at the other two Ardennes classics, with a 10th place in La Flèche Wallonne and 13th in Liège–Bastogne–Liège, the team's highest finisher in both events. Matthews took a field sprint win at the Rund um Köln the day after Liège–Bastogne–Liège. While Rabobank and Leopard Trek were the only ProTeams in the race, several top-level German professionals (such as Danilo Hondo and Marcus Burghardt) rode for an ad hoc German national team. Matthews took the race win ahead of another German, Marcel Kittel, who rode for his regular trade team Skil–Shimano.

The team also sent squads to the Trofeo Palma de Mallorca, Trofeo Cala Millor, the Clásica de Almería, Kuurne–Brussels–Kuurne, Milan–San Remo, Gullegem Koerse and Halle–Ingooigem, but placed no higher than 11th in any of these races.

=== Fall races ===
The team also sent squads to the Vattenfall Cyclassics, the GP Ouest-France, the Memorial Rik Van Steenbergen, the Grand Prix Cycliste de Montréal, the Grand Prix d'Isbergues, Binche–Tournai–Binche, Paris–Tours, the Giro di Lombardia, and the Noosa Grand Prix, but finished no higher than 11th in any of these races.

== Stage races ==
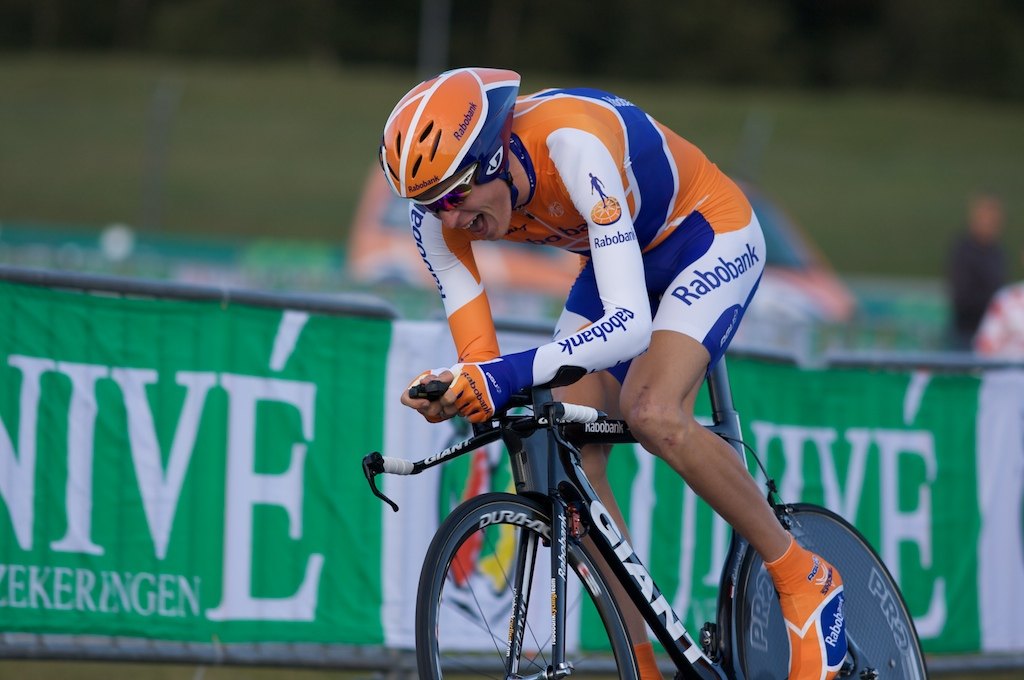
Robert Gesink won two stages and the overall crown at the Tour of Oman.

Matthews scored the team's first victory in the first stage race of the season, the Tour Down Under. After a late split in the field in stage 3 led to 24 riders finishing seven seconds ahead of the next 23, Matthews won a depleted sprint ahead of defending Tour Down Under champion André Greipel and resultant race leader Matthew Goss. He finished the race fourth overall. In February, Boom won the prologue time trial to the Tour of Qatar. It was the first time trial in the Tour's nine-year history. Dead flat and only 2 km (1.2 mi) long, riders were not allowed to use the specially designed bicycles and helmets that are customary in nearly all professional time trials. Despite the very short distance, Boom still had a solid four-second gap over world time trial champion Fabian Cancellara in second. The team was wildly successful at the next UCI Asia Tour stop, the Tour of Oman, which was held shortly after the Tour of Qatar. Bos won the sprint finishes to stages 1 and 3, besting full fields including sprinters the likes of Mark Cavendish, Daniele Bennati, and Matthew Goss both times. While the first three stages were flat like those of its cousin race in Qatar, the fourth and fifth provided that a climber would likely win the Tour of Oman overall. Gesink won both of these stages, the first a road race concluding at Green Mountain which he dedicated to his late father. The next stage was a time trial, and Gesink's win was a bit of a surprise because time trialing is not considered to be a strength for him. He stated after the stage that the hilly course played to his strengths, as did the fact that, like the Tour of Qatar time trial, this one was ridden on normal bicycles. It was the first time trial that he had ever won as a professional; he had started the stage simply hoping to keep the race lead, and instead increased it to over a minute. The final stage was flat again, and though Bos was only tenth in the sprint finale, it capped off a hugely successful event for the team with four stage wins and the overall and youth classifications. Freire added to the team's successful early season at the Ruta del Sol, winning the last two stages in field sprints. These performances also won him the event's points classification. At Tirreno–Adriatico in March, the squad won the team time trial in stage 1, the first ever such stage in the Tirreno–Adriatico's 46-year history. Boom was therefore the first race leader, though he held the lead for only one day. Gesink briefly held the race lead as well, but he was unable to climb with the race's best riders and slipped to fourth after six stages. He turned in a second strong individual time trial performance in as many races to close out the event, moving back onto the podium in second after taking ninth in the closing ITT. He also won the race's youth classification, having led it for the entire event.

At the Tour of the Basque Country, Freire was one of the only true sprinters to enter the notoriously hilly race. Stage 5, while it contained seven categorized climbs, was likely to conducive to a select group sprint since the climbs occurring in the second half of the stage were not especially difficult. Forty-eight riders finished together at the end of the race, and Freire was first over the finish line. A short time later, though, Freire was stripped of his apparent win by the race jury and relegated to the back of the peloton, along with Sánchez, since the two had taken their hands off their handlebars to apparently push away other riders. Sánchez had also seemingly pushed Freire forward about 200 m (660 ft) from the finish line. The victory was transferred to Lampre–ISD's Francesco Gavazzi. Freire called the penalty a "disgrace" and stated that the apparent push was Sánchez signaling him that he should pass him and begin his sprint. The squad nonetheless got a noteworthy result from the race – Gesink again turned in a strong time trial, seventh place in stage 6, and moved up to third place overall in the final standings. Tankink also won the event's sprints classification. Mollema had a strong Vuelta a Castilla y León later in April. After finishing at the front of the race in the first two stages, Mollema was second behind a solo breakaway winner on the race's only summit finish, the Laguna de los Peces. This ride gave him the overall race leadership. He rode to fourth place the next day in the individual time trial, but since Xavier Tondó did him 12 seconds better by finishing third, he lost the race lead to the Spaniard. The time gaps held steady the next day, making Mollema the second-place overall finisher. He also won the event's combination classification, and the Rabobank squad won the team award.

Matthews also won the sprint classification for the team, at the Delta Tour Zeeland. The team also sent squads to the Volta ao Algarve, Paris–Nice, Volta a Catalunya, the Three Days of de Panne, the Tour de Romandie, the Tour of California, the Tour of Belgium, the Ster ZLM Toer, the Brixia Tour, the Tour de Pologne, the Eneco Tour, the USA Pro Cycling Challenge, the Tour de Wallonie-Picarde and the Tour of Beijing, but did not achieve a stage win, classification win, or podium finish in any of them.

== Season victories ==
Date	Race	Competition	Rider	Country	Location
January 20	Tour Down Under, Stage 3	UCI World Tour	Michael Matthews (AUS)	Australia	Stirling
February 6	Tour of Qatar, Prologue	UCI Asia Tour	Lars Boom (NED)	Qatar	Cultural Village
February 15	Tour of Oman, Stage 1	UCI Asia Tour	Theo Bos (NED)	Oman	Al Seeb
February 17	Tour of Oman, Stage 3	UCI Asia Tour	Theo Bos (NED)	Oman	Sur
February 18	Tour of Oman, Stage 4	UCI Asia Tour	Robert Gesink (NED)	Oman	Jebel Akhdar
February 19	Tour of Oman, Stage 5	UCI Asia Tour	Robert Gesink (NED)	Oman	Bander Al Jissah
February 20	Tour of Oman, Overall	UCI Asia Tour	Robert Gesink (NED)	Oman	
February 20	Tour of Oman, Young rider classification	UCI Asia Tour	Robert Gesink (NED)	Oman	
February 23	Vuelta a Andalucía, Stage 4	UCI Europe Tour	Óscar Freire (ESP)	Spain	Córdoba
February 24	Vuelta a Andalucía, Stage 5	UCI Europe Tour	Óscar Freire (ESP)	Spain	Antequera
February 24	Vuelta a Andalucía, Points classification	UCI Europe Tour	Óscar Freire (ESP)	Spain	
February 26	Omloop Het Nieuwsblad	UCI Europe Tour	Sebastian Langeveld (NED)	Belgium	Ghent
March 4	Vuelta a Murcia, Stage 1	UCI Europe Tour	Michael Matthews (AUS)	Spain	Alhama de Murcia
March 9	Tirreno–Adriatico, Stage 1	UCI World Tour	Team time trial (Note: The riders on the squad were Óscar Freire, Lars Boom, Rick Flens, Robert Gesink, Sebastian Langeveld, Tom Leezer, Bram Tankink, and Maarten Wynants)	Italy	Marina di Carrara
March 15	Tirreno–Adriatico, Young rider classification	UCI World Tour	Robert Gesink (NED)	Italy	
April 9	Tour of the Basque Country, Sprints classification	UCI World Tour	Bram Tankink (NED)	Spain	
April 17	Vuelta a Castilla y León, Combination classification	UCI Europe Tour	Bauke Mollema (NED)	Spain	
April 17	Vuelta a Castilla y León, Teams classification	UCI Europe Tour	(Note: The riders on the squad were Theo Bos, Graeme Brown, Laurens ten Dam, Juan Manuel Gárate, Steven Kruijswijk, Tom Jelte Slagter, and Stef Clement)	Spain	
April 25	Rund um Köln	UCI Europe Tour	Michael Matthews (AUS)	Germany	Cologne
May 11	Giro d'Italia, Stage 5	UCI World Tour	Pieter Weening (NED)	Italy	Orvieto
June 5	Critérium du Dauphiné, Prologue	UCI World Tour	Lars Boom (NED)	France	Saint-Jean-de-Maurienne
June 5	Tour de Rijke	UCI Europe Tour	Theo Bos (NED)	Netherlands	Spijkenisse
June 10	Delta Tour Zeeland, Prologue	UCI Europe Tour	Jos van Emden (NED)	Netherlands	Vlissingen
June 12	Delta Tour Zeeland, Sprints classification	UCI Europe Tour	Michael Matthews (AUS)	Netherlands	
June 16	Tour de Suisse, Stage 6	UCI World Tour	Steven Kruijswijk (NED)	Liechtenstein	Malbun
July 10	Tour de France, Stage 9	UCI World Tour	Luis León Sánchez (ESP)	France	Saint-Flour
August 7	Tour of Denmark, Stage 6	UCI Europe Tour	Theo Bos (NED)	Denmark	Frederiksberg
August 19	Dutch Food Valley Classic	UCI Europe Tour	Theo Bos (NED)	Netherlands	Veenendaal
September 11	Vuelta a España, Points classification	UCI World Tour	Bauke Mollema (NED)	Spain	
September 13	Tour of Britain, Stage 3	UCI Europe Tour	Lars Boom (NED)	Great Britain	Stoke-on-Trent
September 16	Tour of Britain, Stage 6	UCI Europe Tour	Lars Boom (NED)	Great Britain	Wells
September 18	Tour of Britain, Overall	UCI Europe Tour	Lars Boom (NED)	Great Britain	
