= 2015 Team LottoNL–Jumbo season =

Team LottoNL–Jumbo
- 2015 season
- Status: UCI ProTeam
- Manager: Richard Plugge
- Main sponsor(s): Jumbo & Staatsloterij
- Based: Netherlands
- Bicycles: Bianchi
- Groupset: Shimano

Season victories
- One-day races: -
- Stage race overall: -
- Stage race stages: 5
- National Championships: 1
- Jersey

The 2015 season for the LottoNL–Jumbo road cycling team began in January at the Tour Down Under. As a UCI WorldTeam, they were automatically invited and obligated to send a squad to every event in the UCI World Tour.

In June 2014 it was announced that Belkin would stop sponsoring the cycling team. On July 20, 2014, the team announced they had an agreement in place with the Brand Loyalty skating team. A day later, the team also released the news that the Dutch Lotto will also sponsor the team. On September 29, 2014, the contracts were signed between the two teams, meaning that the new name would be TEAMLottoNL, with the renaming taking effect from 1 January 2015. On October 23, 2014, the team was unveiled in Utrecht as Team LottoNL–Jumbo showing their new black and yellow team kit. Lotto had previously been confirmed as the team's title sponsor, supermarket chain, Jumbo, was presented as the second sponsor of the WorldTour team.

== Team roster ==
As of 1 January 2015

Rider	Date of birth
George Bennett (NZL)	7 April 1990 (aged 24)
Brian Bulgaç (NED)	7 April 1988 (aged 26)
Rick Flens (NED)	11 April 1983 (aged 31)
Robert Gesink (NED)	31 May 1986 (aged 28)
Marc Goos (NED)	30 November 1990 (aged 24)
Moreno Hofland (NED)	31 August 1991 (aged 23)
Martijn Keizer (NED)	25 March 1988 (aged 26)
Wilco Kelderman (NED)	25 March 1991 (aged 23)
Steven Kruijswijk (NED)	7 June 1987 (aged 27)
Tom Leezer (NED)	26 December 1985 (aged 29)
Bert-Jan Lindeman (NED)	16 June 1989 (aged 25)
Barry Markus (NED)	17 July 1991 (aged 23)
Paul Martens (GER)	26 October 1983 (aged 31)

Rider	Date of birth
Timo Roosen (NED)	11 January 1993 (aged 21)
Bram Tankink (NED)	3 December 1978 (aged 36)
Laurens ten Dam (NED)	13 November 1980 (aged 34)
Mike Teunissen (NED)	25 August 1992 (aged 22)
Maarten Tjallingii (NED)	5 November 1977 (aged 37)
Tom Van Asbroeck (BEL)	19 April 1990 (aged 24)
Nick van der Lijke (NED)	23 September 1991 (aged 23)
Jos van Emden (NED)	27 June 1985 (aged 29)
Sep Vanmarcke (BEL)	28 July 1988 (aged 26)
Robert Wagner (GER)	17 April 1983 (aged 31)
Maarten Wynants (BEL)	13 May 1982 (aged 32)

Riders who joined the team for the 2015 season

Rider	2014 team
George Bennett	Cannondale
Brian Bulgaç	Giant–Shimano
Kevin De Weert	Omega Pharma–Quick-Step
Bert-Jan Lindeman	ex-pro (Rabobank Development)
Timo Roosen	neo-pro (Rabobank Development)
Mike Teunissen	neo-pro (Rabobank Development)
Tom Van Asbroeck	Topsport Vlaanderen–Baloise

Riders who left the team during or after the 2014 season

Rider	2015 team
Jack Bobridge	Budget Forklifts
Jetse Bol	De Rijke
Lars Boom	Astana
Theo Bos	MTN–Qhubeka
Graeme Brown	Drapac Professional Cycling
Stef Clement	IAM Cycling
Juan Manuel Gárate	Retired
Jonathan Hivert	Bretagne–Séché Environnement
Bauke Mollema	Trek Factory Racing
Lars Petter Nordhaug	Team Sky
David Tanner	IAM Cycling
Dennis van Winden	Synergy Baku Cycling Project

== Season victories ==
Date	Race	Competition	Rider	Country	Location
29 March	Volta a Catalunya, Young rider classification	UCI World Tour	Wilco Kelderman (NED)	Spain	
2 May	Tour de Yorkshire, Stage 2	UCI Europe Tour	Moreno Hofland (NED)	United Kingdom	York
20 June	Ster ZLM Toer, Stage 3	UCI Europe Tour	Moreno Hofland (NED)	Belgium	Jalhay
11 August	Tour de l'Ain, Prologue	UCI Europe Tour	Mike Teunissen (NED)	France	Bourg-en-Bresse
13 August	Eneco Tour, Stage 4	UCI World Tour	Jos van Emden (NED)	Netherlands	Hoogerheide
28 August	Vuelta a España, Stage 7	UCI World Tour	Bert-Jan Lindeman (NED)	Spain	La Alpujarra

== National, Continental and World champions 2015 ==
Date	Discipline	Jersey	Rider	Country	Location
24 June	Dutch National Time Trial Champion		Wilco Kelderman (NED)	Netherlands	Emmen
