= 2012 Rabobank season =

Dutch cycling team season

2012 Rabobank season
Manager	Erik Breukink
One-day victories	5
Stage race overall victories	2
Stage race stage victories	15
Previous season • Next season

The 2012 season for the Rabobank cycling team began in January at the Tour Down Under. As a UCI ProTeam, they were automatically invited and obligated to send a squad to every event in the UCI World Tour.

== 2012 roster ==
Ages as of 1 January 2012.

Rider	Date of birth
Carlos Barredo (ESP)	5 June 1981 (aged 30)
Jetse Bol (NED)	8 September 1989 (aged 22)
Lars Boom (NED)	30 December 1985 (aged 26)
Theo Bos (NED)	22 August 1983 (aged 28)
Matti Breschel (DEN)	31 August 1984 (aged 27)
Graeme Brown (AUS)	9 April 1979 (aged 32)
Stef Clement (NED)	24 September 1982 (aged 29)
Rick Flens (NED)	11 April 1983 (aged 28)
Juan Manuel Gárate (ESP)	24 April 1976 (aged 35)
Robert Gesink (NED)	31 May 1986 (aged 25)
Marc Goos (Note: Goos joined the team on 1 August, as a stagiaire, from the Rabobank Continental team.) (NED)	30 November 1990 (aged 21)
Wilco Kelderman (NED)	25 March 1991 (aged 20)
Steven Kruijswijk (NED)	7 June 1987 (aged 24)
Tom Leezer (NED)	26 December 1985 (aged 26)

Rider	Date of birth
Paul Martens (GER)	26 October 1983 (aged 28)
Michael Matthews (AUS)	26 September 1990 (aged 21)
Bauke Mollema (NED)	26 November 1986 (aged 25)
Grischa Niermann (GER)	3 November 1975 (aged 36)
Mark Renshaw (AUS)	22 October 1982 (aged 29)
Luis León Sánchez (ESP)	24 November 1983 (aged 28)
Tom-Jelte Slagter (NED)	1 July 1989 (aged 22)
Bram Tankink (NED)	3 December 1978 (aged 33)
Laurens ten Dam (NED)	13 November 1980 (aged 31)
Maarten Tjallingii (NED)	5 November 1977 (aged 34)
Jos van Emden (NED)	27 June 1987 (aged 24)
Dennis van Winden (NED)	2 December 1987 (aged 24)
Coen Vermeltfoort (NED)	11 April 1988 (aged 23)
Maarten Wynants (BEL)	13 May 1982 (aged 29)

Riders who joined the team for the 2012 season

Rider	2011 team
Jetse Bol	stagiaire (Rabobank)
Wilco Kelderman	Rabobank continental team
Mark Renshaw	HTC–Highroad

Riders who left the team during or after the 2011 season

Rider	2012 team
Pieter Weening	GreenEDGE
Sebastian Langeveld	GreenEDGE
Óscar Freire	Team Katusha

== Season victories ==
Date	Race	Competition	Rider	Country	Location
26 February	Clásica de Almería	UCI Europe Tour	Michael Matthews (AUS)	Spain	Almería
9 March	Paris–Nice, Stage 6	UCI World Tour	Luis León Sánchez (ESP)	France	Sisteron
9 March	Dwars door Drenthe	UCI Europe Tour	Theo Bos (NED)	Netherlands	Hoogeveen
14 April	Vuelta a Castilla y León, Stage 2	UCI Europe Tour	Luis León Sánchez (ESP)	Spain	Ávila
22 April	Presidential Cycling Tour of Turkey, Stage 1	UCI Europe Tour	Theo Bos (NED)	Turkey	Alanya
25 April	Presidential Cycling Tour of Turkey, Stage 4	UCI Europe Tour	Mark Renshaw (AUS)	Turkey	Marmaris
27 April	Tour de Romandie, Stage 3	UCI World Tour	Luis León Sánchez (ESP)	Switzerland	Charmey
28 April	Tour de Romandie, Stage 4	UCI World Tour	Luis León Sánchez (ESP)	Switzerland	Sion
29 April	Presidential Cycling Tour of Turkey, Stage 8	UCI Europe Tour	Theo Bos (NED)	Turkey	Istanbul
19 May	Tour of California, Stage 7	UCI America Tour	Robert Gesink (NED)	United States	Mount Baldy
20 May	Tour of California, Overall	UCI America Tour	Robert Gesink (NED)	United States	
20 May	Tour of California, Young rider classification	UCI America Tour	Wilco Kelderman (NED)	United States	
10 June	Critérium du Dauphiné, Young rider classification	UCI World Tour	Wilco Kelderman (NED)	France	
16 June	Ster ZLM Toer, Stage 3	UCI Europe Tour	Lars Boom (NED)	Belgium	La Gileppe-Jalhay
15 July	Tour de France, Stage 14	UCI World Tour	Luis León Sánchez (ESP)	France	Foix
3 August	Vuelta a Burgos, Stage 3	UCI Europe Tour	Matti Breschel (DEN)	Spain	Lerma
4 August	Vuelta a Burgos, Stage 4	UCI Europe Tour	Paul Martens (GER)	Spain	Clunia
8 August	Eneco Tour, Stage 3	UCI World Tour	Theo Bos (NED)	Belgium	Genk
9 August	Tour of Utah, Stage 3	UCI America Tour	Michael Matthews (AUS)	United States	Salt Lake City
12 August	Eneco Tour, Overall	UCI World Tour	Lars Boom (NED)	(Note: Race held in Belgium and the Netherlands.)	
12 August	Tour of Utah, Sprints classification	UCI America Tour	Michael Matthews (AUS)	United States	
14 August	Clásica de San Sebastián	UCI World Tour	Luis León Sánchez (ESP)	Spain	San Sebastián
17 August	Dutch Food Valley Classic	UCI Europe Tour	Theo Bos (NED)	Netherlands	Veenendaal
26 August	Danmark Rundt, Young rider classification	UCI Europe Tour	Wilco Kelderman (NED)	Denmark	
1 September	World Ports Classic, Stage 2	UCI Europe Tour	Theo Bos (NED)	Netherlands	Rotterdam
5 September	Memorial Rik Van Steenbergen	UCI Europe Tour	Theo Bos (NED)	Belgium	Aartselaar
