= 2014 Belkin Pro Cycling season =

Belkin Pro Cycling
- 2014 season
- Manager: Richard Plugge

Season victories
- One-day races: 2
- Stage race overall: 2
- Stage race stages: 19
- Jersey

The 2014 season for the Belkin Pro Cycling team began in January at the Tour Down Under. As a UCI ProTeam, they were automatically invited and obligated to send a squad to every event in the UCI World Tour.

== Team roster ==
As of 4 March 2014.

Rider	Date of birth
Jack Bobridge (AUS)	13 July 1989 (aged 24)
Jetse Bol (NED)	8 September 1989 (aged 24)
Lars Boom (NED)	30 December 1985 (aged 28)
Theo Bos (NED)	22 August 1983 (aged 30)
Graeme Brown (AUS)	9 April 1979 (aged 34)
Stef Clement (NED)	24 September 1982 (aged 31)
Rick Flens (NED)	11 April 1983 (aged 30)
Juan Manuel Gárate (Note: Gárate left the team on 25 February.) (ESP)	24 April 1976 (aged 37)
Robert Gesink (NED)	31 May 1986 (aged 27)
Marc Goos (NED)	30 November 1990 (aged 23)
Jonathan Hivert (FRA)	23 March 1985 (aged 28)
Moreno Hofland (NED)	31 August 1991 (aged 22)
Martijn Keizer (Note: Keizer joined the team on 25 February, after leaving VeranClassic-Doltcini.) (NED)	25 March 1988 (aged 25)
Wilco Kelderman (NED)	25 March 1991 (aged 22)
Steven Kruijswijk (NED)	7 June 1987 (aged 26)

Rider	Date of birth
Tom Leezer (NED)	26 December 1985 (aged 28)
Barry Markus (NED)	17 July 1991 (aged 22)
Paul Martens (GER)	26 October 1983 (aged 30)
Bauke Mollema (NED)	26 November 1986 (aged 27)
Lars Petter Nordhaug (NOR)	14 May 1984 (aged 29)
Bram Tankink (NED)	3 December 1978 (aged 35)
David Tanner (AUS)	30 September 1984 (aged 29)
Laurens ten Dam (NED)	13 November 1980 (aged 33)
Maarten Tjallingii (NED)	5 November 1977 (aged 36)
Nick van der Lijke (NED)	23 September 1991 (aged 22)
Jos van Emden (NED)	27 June 1987 (aged 26)
Dennis van Winden (NED)	2 December 1987 (aged 26)
Sep Vanmarcke (BEL)	28 July 1988 (aged 25)
Robert Wagner (GER)	17 April 1983 (aged 30)
Maarten Wynants (BEL)	13 May 1982 (aged 31)

Riders who joined the team for the 2014 season

Rider	2013 team
Jonathan Hivert	Sojasun
Barry Markus	Vacansoleil–DCM
Nick van der Lijke	neo-pro (Rabobank Development Team)

Riders who left the team during or after the 2013 season

Rider	2014 team
Mark Renshaw	Omega Pharma–Quick-Step
Luis León Sánchez	Caja Rural–Seguros RGA
Tom-Jelte Slagter	Garmin–Sharp

== Season victories ==
Date	Race	Competition	Rider	Country	Location
23 February	Vuelta a Andalucía, Stage 4	UCI Europe Tour	Moreno Hofland (NED)	Spain	Fuengirola
28 February	Tour de Langkawi, Stage 2	UCI Asia Tour	Theo Bos (NED)	Malaysia	Taiping
5 March	Tour de Langkawi, Stage 7	UCI Asia Tour	Theo Bos (NED)	Malaysia	Pekan
6 March	Tour de Langkawi, Stage 8	UCI Asia Tour	Theo Bos (NED)	Malaysia	Marang
7 March	Tour de Langkawi, Stage 9	UCI Asia Tour	Theo Bos (NED)	Malaysia	Kuala Terengganu
10 March	Paris–Nice, Stage 2	UCI World Tour	Moreno Hofland (NED)	France	Saint-Georges-sur-Baulche
29 March	Volta a Catalunya, Stage 6	UCI World Tour	Stef Clement (NED)	Spain	Vilanova i la Geltrú
30 March	Volta a Catalunya, Mountains classification	UCI World Tour	Stef Clement (NED)	Spain	
5 April	Volta Limburg Classic	UCI Europe Tour	Moreno Hofland (NED)	Netherlands	Eijsden
23 May	Tour of Norway, Stage 3	UCI Europe Tour	Sep Vanmarcke (BEL)	Norway	Budor
24 May	Tour of Norway, Stage 4	UCI Europe Tour	Bauke Mollema (NED)	Norway	Lillehammer
25 May	World Ports Classic, Overall	UCI Europe Tour	Theo Bos (NED)	(Note: Race held in Belgium and the Netherlands.)	
25 May	World Ports Classic, Points classification	UCI Europe Tour	Theo Bos (NED)		
1 June	Tour of Belgium, Stage 5	UCI Europe Tour	Paul Martens (GER)	Belgium	Oreye
7 June	Ronde van Zeeland Seaports	UCI Europe Tour	Theo Bos (NED)	Netherlands	Goes
15 June	Critérium du Dauphiné, Young rider classification	UCI World Tour	Wilco Kelderman (NED)	France	
22 June	Tour de Suisse, Teams classification	UCI World Tour	(Note: The riders on the squad were Bauke Mollema, Stef Clement, Marc Goos, Steven Kruijswijk, Tom Leezer, Laurens ten Dam, Sep Vanmarcke and Maarten Wynants)	Switzerland	
9 July	Tour de France, Stage 5	UCI World Tour	Lars Boom (NED)	France	Arenberg Porte du Hainaut
4 August	Tour of Utah, Stage 1	UCI America Tour	Moreno Hofland (NED)	United States	Cedar City
5 August	Tour de Pologne, Stage 3	UCI World Tour	Theo Bos (NED)	Poland	Rzeszów
6 August	Tour of Utah, Stage 3	UCI America Tour	Moreno Hofland (NED)	United States	Miller Motorsports Park
14 August	Arctic Race of Norway, Stage 1	UCI Europe Tour	Lars Petter Nordhaug (NOR)	Norway	Nordkapp
17 August	Arctic Race of Norway, Overall	UCI Europe Tour	Steven Kruijswijk (NED)	Norway	
17 August	Arctic Race of Norway, Teams classification	UCI Europe Tour	(Note: The riders on the squad were Lars Petter Nordhaug, Stef Clement, Jonathan Hivert, Steven Kruijswijk, David Tanner and Nick van der Lijke)	Norway	
5 September	Tour of Alberta, Stage 3	UCI America Tour	Sep Vanmarcke (BEL)	Canada	Edmonton
6 September	Tour of Alberta, Stage 4	UCI America Tour	Theo Bos (NED)	Canada	Strathcona County
4 October	Tour de l'Eurométropole, Stage 3	UCI Europe Tour	Theo Bos (NED)	Belgium	Middelkerke
20 October	Tour of Hainan, Stage 1	UCI Asia Tour	Moreno Hofland (NED)	China	Chengmai
