= 2010 Rabobank season =

Dutch cycling team season

2010 Rabobank season
Manager	Erik Breukink
One-day victories	7
Stage race overall victories	–
Stage race stage victories	13
Previous season • Next season

The 2010 season for the Rabobank cycling team began in January with the Tour Down Under and ended in October at the Giro di Lombardia. As a UCI ProTour team, they were automatically invited and obliged to attend every event in the ProTour.

The team's manager was former team member Erik Breukink, in his seventh season in the role. The team's ridership was almost entirely unchanged from 2009, with a small number of riders departing and the only arrivals being promotions from the Rabobank continental team.

== 2010 roster ==
Ages as of January 1, 2010.

Rider	Date of birth
Mauricio Ardila (COL)	May 12, 1979 (aged 30)
Lars Boom (NED)	December 30, 1985 (aged 24)
Graeme Brown (AUS)	April 9, 1979 (aged 30)
Stef Clement (NED)	September 24, 1982 (aged 27)
Rick Flens (NED)	April 11, 1983 (aged 26)
Óscar Freire (ESP)	February 15, 1976 (aged 33)
Juan Manuel Gárate (ESP)	April 24, 1976 (aged 33)
Robert Gesink (NED)	May 31, 1986 (aged 23)
Dmitri Kozontchuk (RUS)	April 5, 1984 (aged 25)
Steven Kruijswijk (NED)	June 7, 1987 (aged 22)
Sebastian Langeveld (NED)	January 17, 1985 (aged 24)
Tom Leezer (NED)	December 26, 1985 (aged 24)
Paul Martens (GER)	October 26, 1983 (aged 26)
Denis Menchov (RUS)	January 25, 1978 (aged 31)

Rider	Date of birth
Koos Moerenhout (NED)	November 5, 1973 (aged 36)
Bauke Mollema (NED)	November 26, 1986 (aged 23)
Grischa Niermann (GER)	November 3, 1975 (aged 34)
Nick Nuyens (BEL)	May 5, 1980 (aged 29)
Joost Posthuma (NED)	March 8, 1981 (aged 28)
Kai Reus (NED)	March 11, 1985 (aged 24)
Tom Stamsnijder (NED)	May 15, 1985 (aged 24)
Bram Tankink (NED)	December 3, 1978 (aged 31)
Laurens ten Dam (NED)	November 13, 1980 (aged 29)
Maarten Tjallingii (NED)	November 5, 1977 (aged 32)
Jos van Emden (NED)	June 27, 1987 (aged 22)
Dennis van Winden (NED)	December 2, 1987 (aged 22)
Pieter Weening (NED)	February 18, 1985 (aged 24)

Riders who joined the team for the 2010 season

Rider	2009 team
Steven Kruijswijk	Rabobank continental team
Dennis van Winden	Rabobank continental team

Riders who left the team during or after the 2009 season

Rider	2010 team
Juan Antonio Flecha	Team Sky
Bram de Groot	Retired
Marc de Maar	UnitedHealthcare–Maxxis
Mathew Hayman	Team Sky
Pedro Horrillo	Retired

== One-day races ==
Freire scored the team's first victory of the season in the Trofeo Cala Millor, part of the Vuelta a Mallorca quasi-stage race, as he outsprinted Tour Down Under stars André Greipel and Manuel Cardoso.

== Grand Tours ==
=== Giro d'Italia ===
Menchov, the 2009 Giro d'Italia champion, announced in October 2009 that he would not defend his championship in 2010. The team thus entered the Giro without any expectations of contending for another overall victory. Mollema rode as the squad leader. Freire was supposed to start the race, with aims of winning one of the flat road race stages in the team's home country, the Netherlands, but he pulled out of the race two days before it started due to respiratory illness. Kruijswijk took Freire's place on the squad. The squad wore special jerseys for the Giro, incorporating the colors of the Italian flag and the logo for Right To Play, which the team supports. The jerseys were later auctioned off with the proceeds going to Right To Play.

As expected, the squad was active in the opening to the Giro in the Netherlands. Van Emden was ninth best in the stage 1 individual time trial, 9 seconds off Bradley Wiggins' winning time. Flens made the breakaway in stage 2, and Brown took eighth in the sprint for the finish line. The next day of racing was similar, with Stamsnijder making the morning break and Brown finishing second just behind Wouter Weylandt in the sprint. Weening was tenth in the overall standings prior to the transfer to Italy, 16 seconds behind the race leader. Brown led the points classification and wore the red jersey at this point. The squad was 11th in the stage 4 team time trial, just over a minute of Liquigas–Doimo's winning pace. Brown was one of the many sprinters upset by a three-rider breakaway just surviving to the finish in stage 5. He was seventh on this stage, but lost the red jersey to Jérôme Pineau who was up the road in the breakaway and won the stage. Van Emden contested the depleted group sprint in stage 9, finishing ninth.

The squad was then quiet for several days, but in the final stages in the Dolomites both Mollema and Kruijswijk turned in solid rides. In stage 14, which went over Monte Grappa, Mollema rode with the second group on the road, finishing the stage seventh. Kruijswijk made a winning breakaway three stages later and had a chance for victory at Pejo Terme. Kruijswijk, Danilo Hondo, and Damien Monier were the last three riders together at the head of the race and finished well clear of the others. Monier soloed to victory more than 30 seconds ahead, and Hondo left Kruijswijk behind in the stage's final kilometer, leaving him third. Brown contested the sprint in stage 18, the Giro's last mass finish, coming away sixth. Mollema was eighth in the Giro's most climbing-intensive day, stage 20, riding the Passo di Gavia and Passo del Tonale with or near the Giro elite. In the final day's time trial, Stamsnijder took tenth. Despite not expecting their squad to contend in the overall standings, Rabobank was one of only three squads (the others being Liquigas–Doimo and Ag2r–La Mondiale) to finish with three riders in the top 20 overall. These were Mollema in 12th, Ardila in 15th, and Kruijswijk in 18th. Stamsnijder won the Giro's TV classification for intermediate sprints (TV being short for traguardo volante, or "flying sprint"). The squad also placed well in both teams classifications, finishing second in the Trofeo Fast Team and third in the Trofeo Super Team.

=== Tour de France ===
Menchov and Gesink co-captained the squad sent to the Tour de France. Menchov was often mentioned as a contender for overall victory, as he sought the Tour title to complete the career sweep of the Grand Tours. Menchov had fallen ill in May at the Tour de Romandie, but reported regaining his strength during the Critérium du Dauphiné and believed himself to be in optimal form for the Tour. Freire was also named to the squad, with the intention of acting as a free agent (a sprinter without his own leadout train) in the flat stages. The team hoped for a mountain stage win and possibly a high overall placing from Gesink.

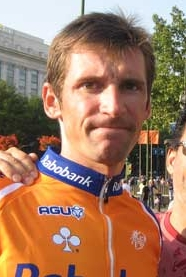
Denis Menchov entered the Tour de France with overall victory his goal, and finished third overall.

The team was mostly quiet in the race's first week. Menchov rode poorly in the prologue time trial, nearly a minute off the winning time of Fabian Cancellara and five seconds worse than Gesink, despite the fact that Menchov is generally the far superior time trialist. In stage 2, when dozens of riders from nearly every team crashed on a slippery descent of the Col du Stockeu in Spa, Gesink crashed and broke a bone in his right arm. It was reported as likely that he would withdraw from the Tour, but he rode on. Freire had difficulties in the early flat stages, tenth in stage 4 the closest he came to a victory.

In stage 7 to Station des Rousses in the Jura, the first stage with any significant quantity of climbing, Menchov and Gesink both finished with the peloton, a result which moved Menchov into tenth overall after being distant in the overall classification to that point. The next day, in a more climbing-intensive stage, Menchov and Gesink finished with the second group on the road, ceding 10 seconds to Andy Schleck and Samuel Sánchez but gaining time against everyone else in the race. This result moved Menchov up to fifth overall, and Gesink to 11th, up from 23rd. In the next stage, one which featured one of the Tour's hardest climbs, the Col de la Madeleine, Menchov and Gesink rode most of the stage together. They lost two minutes to Schleck and Alberto Contador and effectively any chance to win the race, and also lost one minute and ten seconds to Sánchez, but gained time against nearly everyone else in the race. They occupied fourth (Menchov) and seventh (Gesink) after the stage. During stage 14, Menchov and Sánchez pulled back 14 seconds from Schleck and Contador, after the two leaders engaged in a bizarre seeming track stand during the stage's final climb to Ax-3-Domaines. They still sat over two minutes behind them in the overall classification, an effectively insurmountable time gap. Gesink also passed Levi Leipheimer in this stage to move up to sixth overall, as the American lost 45 seconds to Gesink's group.

In stage 15, Menchov and Sánchez were tangentially involved in the day's greater controversy. While the group of overall favorites was climbing the hors catégorie Port de Balès, the chain on race leader Schleck's bicycle slipped. At the exact moment that happened, Contador attacked and got clear of the group. While Schleck was unable to respond due to his mechanical trouble, Menchov and Sánchez, along with five others, followed Contador and finished 39 seconds clear of the Luxembourger, though their positions relative to both of the leading riders was essentially unchanged. In the race's queen stage, stage 17 ending at the Col du Tourmalet, Menchov and Gesink again finished together. The lost a minute and 40 seconds to Schleck and Contador, who finished together at the head of the race, and eight seconds to Sánchez. This gave Sánchez a 21-second lead over Menchov for the third step on the podium, but with a 52 km (32 mi) individual time trial still to contest, Menchov had good odds of overtaking him. During that time trial, a drastic change in wind direction occurred. This made it so earlier starters posted considerably better times than those who came later. Contador, for example, who had won the long time trial in the 2009 Tour de France, was 35th on the day, 5 minutes and 43 seconds off the pace. Menchov, however, was 11th, taking time out of nearly every other rider in the race. The result moved him up to third overall, a position he held in the Tour's largely ceremonial finale the next day. The squad finished third in the teams classification.

== Season victories ==
Date	Race	Competition	Rider	Country	Location
February 8	Trofeo Cala Millor	UCI Europe Tour	Óscar Freire (ESP)	Spain	Mallorca
February 22	Ruta Del Sol, Stage 2	UCI Europe Tour	Óscar Freire (ESP)	Spain	Córdoba
February 23	Ruta Del Sol, Stage 3	UCI Europe Tour	Óscar Freire (ESP)	Spain	Benahavís
February 25	Ruta Del Sol, Points classification	UCI Europe Tour	Óscar Freire (ESP)	Spain	
March 7	Paris–Nice, Prologue	UCI World Ranking	Lars Boom (NED)	France	Montfort-l'Amaury
March 16	Tirreno–Adriatico, Youth classification	UCI World Ranking	Robert Gesink (NED)	Italy	
March 20	Milan–Sanremo	UCI World Ranking	Óscar Freire (ESP)	Italy	Sanremo
April 5	Tour of the Basque Country, Stage 1	UCI ProTour	Óscar Freire (ESP) (Note: Freire was originally relegated to second place in this stage despite crossing the finish line first, though when all of Alejandro Valverde's 2010 wins were vacated due to his suspension, Freire became the stage winner.)	Spain	Zierbena
April 6	Tour of the Basque Country, Stage 2	UCI ProTour	Óscar Freire (ESP) (Note: Freire originally finished second to Valverde in this stage, but was awarded the victory after all of Valverde's 2010 results were vacated)	Spain	Viana
May 30	Giro d'Italia, TV classification	UCI World Ranking	Tom Stamsnijder (NED)	Italy	
June 11	Delta Tour Zeeland, Prologue	UCI Europe Tour	Jos Van Emden (NED)	Netherlands	Hulst
June 13	Delta Tour Zeeland, Youth classification	UCI Europe Tour	Jos Van Emden (NED)	Netherlands	
June 16	Ster Elektrotoer, Prologue	UCI Europe Tour	Jos Van Emden (NED)	Netherlands	Gemert
June 17	Tour de Suisse, Stage 6	UCI World Ranking	Robert Gesink (NED)	Switzerland	La Punt Chamues-ch
July 8	Tour of Austria, Stage 5	UCI Europe Tour	Nick Nuyens (BEL)	Austria	Deutschlandsberg
July 10	Tour of Austria, Stage 7	UCI Europe Tour	Joost Posthuma (NED)	Austria	Podersdorf am Neusiedler See
July 10	Tour of Austria, Stage 8	UCI Europe Tour	Graeme Brown (AUS)	Austria	Vienna
August 6	Tour de Pologne, Stage 6	UCI ProTour	Bauke Mollema (NED)	Poland	Terma Bukowina Tatrz
August 20	Eneco Tour, Stage 3	UCI ProTour	Koos Moerenhout (NED)	Belgium	Ronse
August 20	Tour du Limousin, Youth classification	UCI Europe Tour	Sebastian Langeveld (NED)	France	
August 20	Tour du Limousin, Teams classification	UCI Europe Tour	(Note: The riders on the squad were Mauricio Ardila, Steven Kruijswijk, Sebastian Langeveld, Dennis van Winden, Grischa Niermann, Laurens ten Dam, Dmitry Kozontchuk and Tom Stamsnijder)	France	
September 5	Grote Prijs Jef Scherens	UCI Europe Tour	Lars Boom (NED)	Belgium	Leuven
September 12	Grand Prix Cycliste de Montréal	UCI ProTour	Robert Gesink (NED)	Canada	Montreal
September 15	Grand Prix de Wallonie	UCI Europe Tour	Paul Martens (GER)	Belgium	Namur
October 9	Giro dell'Emilia	UCI Europe Tour	Robert Gesink (NED)	Italy	San Luca
October 10	Paris–Tours	UCI Europe Tour	Óscar Freire (ESP)	France	Tours
