= 2020 UCI Track Cycling World Championships – Men's 1 km time trial =

Men's 1 km time trial at the 2020 UCI Track Cycling World Championships
- Venue: Velodrom
- Location: Berlin, Germany
- Dates: 28 February
- Competitors: 22 from 14 nations
- Winning time: 59.495

Medalists
| gold medal | Sam Ligtlee | Netherlands |
| silver medal | Quentin Lafargue | France |
| bronze medal | Michaël D'Almeida | France |

The Men's 1 km time trial competition at the 2020 UCI Track Cycling World Championships was held on 28 February 2020.

== Results ==
=== Qualifying ===
The qualifying was started at 15:18. The top 8 riders qualified for the final.

| Rank | Name | Nation | Time | Behind | Notes |
|---|---|---|---|---|---|
| 1 | Quentin Lafargue | France | 59.324 | | Q |
| 2 | Sam Ligtlee | Netherlands | 59.590 | +0.266 | Q |
| 3 | Michaël D'Almeida | France | 59.974 | +0.650 | Q |
| 4 | Vincent De Haître | Canada | 1:00.018 | +0.694 | Q |
| 5 | Theo Bos | Netherlands | 1:00.033 | +0.709 | Q |
| 6 | Maximilian Dörnbach | Germany | 1:00.232 | +0.908 | Q |
| 7 | Muhammad Mohd Zonis | Malaysia | 1:00.305 | +0.981 | Q |
| 8 | Nicholas Kergozou | New Zealand | 1:00.311 | +0.987 | Q |
| 9 | Tomáš Bábek | Czech Republic | 1:00.450 | +1.126 | |
| 10 | Joachim Eilers | Germany | 1:00.671 | +1.347 | |
| 11 | Melvin Landerneau | France | 1:00.761 | +1.437 | |
| 12 | Santiago Ramírez | Colombia | 1:00.826 | +1.502 | |
| 13 | Francesco Lamon | Italy | 1:00.877 | +1.553 | |
| 14 | Alexander Porter | Australia | 1:00.960 | +1.636 | |
| 15 | Cameron Scott | Australia | 1:01.057 | +1.733 | |
| 16 | Samuel Dakin | New Zealand | 1:01.204 | +1.880 | |
| 17 | José Moreno Sánchez | Spain | 1:01.331 | +2.007 | |
| 18 | Andrey Chugay | Kazakhstan | 1:01.659 | +2.335 | |
| 19 | Law Tsz Chun | Hong Kong | 1:02.000 | +2.676 | |
| 20 | Luo Yongjia | China | 1:02.630 | +3.306 | |
| 21 | Francesco Ceci | Italy | 1:02.731 | +3.407 | |
| 22 | Sergey Ponomaryov | Kazakhstan | 1:03.105 | +3.781 | |
| | Krzysztof Maksel | Poland | Did not start | | |

=== Final ===
The final was started at 20:00.

| Rank | Name | Nation | Time | Behind | Notes |
|---|---|---|---|---|---|
| 1st place, gold medalist(s) | Sam Ligtlee | Netherlands | 59.495 | | |
| 2nd place, silver medalist(s) | Quentin Lafargue | France | 59.749 | +0.254 | |
| 3rd place, bronze medalist(s) | Michaël D'Almeida | France | 1:00.103 | +0.608 | |
| 4 | Vincent De Haître | Canada | 1:00.119 | +0.624 | |
| 5 | Theo Bos | Netherlands | 1:00.330 | +0.835 | |
| 6 | Maximilian Dörnbach | Germany | 1:00.600 | +1.105 | |
| 7 | Nicholas Kergozou | New Zealand | 1:00.707 | +1.212 | |
| 8 | Muhammad Mohd Zonis | Malaysia | 1:00.895 | +1.400 | |
