= 2019 UCI Track Cycling World Championships – Men's 1 km time trial =

Men's 1 km time trial at the 2019 UCI Track Cycling World Championships
- Venue: BGŻ Arena
- Location: Pruszków, Poland
- Dates: 1 March
- Competitors: 19 from 14 nations
- Winning time: 1:00.029

Medalists
gold medal	Quentin Lafargue	France
silver medal	Theo Bos	Netherlands
bronze medal	Michaël D'Almeida	France

The Men's 1 km time trial competition at the 2019 UCI Track Cycling World Championships was held on 1 March 2019.

== Results ==
=== Qualifying ===
The qualifying was started at 15:18. The top 8 riders qualified for the final.

Rank	Name	Nation	Time	Behind	Notes
1	Quentin Lafargue	France	59.845		Q
2	Theo Bos	Netherlands	1:00.133	+0.288	Q
3	Michaël D'Almeida	France	1:00.379	+0.534	Q
4	Francesco Lamon	Italy	1:00.550	+0.705	Q
5	Cameron Scott	Australia	1:00.790	+0.945	Q
6	Marc Jurczyk	Germany	1:01.002	+1.157	Q
7	Sam Ligtlee	Netherlands	1:01.062	+1.217	Q
8	Tomáš Bábek	Czech Republic	1:01.092	+1.247	Q
9	Robin Wagner	Czech Republic	1:01.195	+1.350	
10	Nicholas Kergozou	New Zealand	1:01.436	+1.591	
11	Joseph Truman	Great Britain	1:01.545	+1.700	
12	Eric Engler	Germany	1:01.591	+1.746	
13	Santiago Ramírez	Colombia	1:01.731	+1.886	
14	José Moreno Sánchez	Spain	1:02.050	+2.205	
15	Jean Spies	South Africa	1:02.608	+2.763	
16	Aidan Caves	Canada	1:02.812	+2.967	
17	Corbin Strong	New Zealand	1:02.821	+2.976	
18	Alexander Sharapov	Russia	1:03.170	+3.325	
19	Sergey Ponomaryov	Kazakhstan	1:03.494	+3.649	

=== Final ===
The final was started at 19:56.

Rank	Name	Nation	Time	Behind	Notes
1st place, gold medalist(s)	Quentin Lafargue	France	1:00.029		
2nd place, silver medalist(s)	Theo Bos	Netherlands	1:00.388	+0.359	
3rd place, bronze medalist(s)	Michaël D'Almeida	France	1:00.826	+0.797	
4	Francesco Lamon	Italy	1:00.958	+0.929	
5	Cameron Scott	Australia	1:01.048	+1.019	
6	Tomáš Bábek	Czech Republic	1:01.186	+1.157	
7	Sam Ligtlee	Netherlands	1:01.205	+1.176	
8	Marc Jurczyk	Germany	1:01.569	+1.540	
