= 2014 Volta Limburg Classic =

2014 Hel van het Mergelland
Race details
- Dates: 5 April 2014
- Stages: 1
- Distance: 196 km (121.8 mi)
- Winning time: 4h 46' 41"

Results
	Winner	Moreno Hofland (NED)
	Second	Sonny Colbrelli (ITA)
	Third	Mauro Finetto (ITA)

The 2014 Volta Limburg Classic was the 41st edition of the Volta Limburg Classic cycle race and was held on 5 April 2014. The race started and finished in Eijsden. The race was won by Moreno Hofland.

== General classification ==
Final general classification

Rank	Rider	Time
1	Moreno Hofland (NED)	4h 46' 41"
2	Sonny Colbrelli (ITA)	+ 0"
3	Mauro Finetto (ITA)	+ 0"
4	Daniele Colli (ITA)	+ 0"
5	Magnus Cort (DEN)	+ 0"
6	Michel Kreder (NED)	+ 0"
7	Alessandro Bazzana (ITA)	+ 0"
8	Kenny van Hummel (NED)	+ 0"
9	Maciej Paterski (POL)	+ 0"
10	Koen Bouwman (NED)	+ 0"
