= 2010 Clásica de Almería =

Race details
- Dates: 28 February 2010
- Stages: 1
- Distance: 178.2 km (110.7 mi)
- Winning time: 4h 22' 53"

Results
	Winner	Theo Bos (NED)
	Second	Mark Cavendish (GBR)
	Third	Graeme Brown (AUS)

The 2010 Clásica de Almería was the 25th edition of the Clásica de Almería cycle race and was held on 28 February 2010. The race started and finished in Almería. The race was won by Theo Bos.

== General classification ==
Final general classification

Rank	Rider	Time
1	Theo Bos (NED)	4h 22' 53"
2	Mark Cavendish (GBR)	+ 0"
3	Graeme Brown (AUS)	+ 0"
4	Luis León Sánchez (ESP)	+ 0"
5	Davide Appollonio (ITA)	+ 0"
6	Michał Gołaś (POL)	+ 0"
7	Jorge Martín Montenegro (ESP)	+ 0"
8	Daniel Moreno (ESP)	+ 0"
9	Rubén Pérez (ESP)	+ 0"
10	Jan Bakelants (BEL)	+ 0"
