= 2013 Tour of Hainan =

2013–14 UCI Asia Tour, race 3 of 41

Race details
- Dates: 20–28 October 2013
- Stages: 9
- Distance: 1,487.9 km (924.5 mi)

Results
	Winner	Moreno Hofland (NED)	(Belkin Pro Cycling)
	Second	Frédéric Amorison (BEL)	(Crelan–Euphony)
	Third	Tom Leezer (NED)	(Belkin Pro Cycling)
	Points	Moreno Hofland (NED)	(Belkin Pro Cycling)
	Mountains	Mateusz Taciak (POL)	(CCC–Polsat–Polkowice)
	Team	Belkin Pro Cycling	

The 2013 Tour of Hainan was the eighth edition of the Tour of Hainan cycling stage race. It was rated as a 2.HC event on the UCI Asia Tour, and was held between 20 and 28 October 2013, in Hainan. It was won by Moreno Hofland, in his first professional victory ever. Hofland won 3 stages, his teammate Theo Bos won the other six; it was the first time that a cycling team won all stages and the general classification in a UCI HC event.

== Teams ==
Eighteen teams competed in the 2013 Tour of Hainan. These included one UCI ProTour teams, four UCI Professional Continental teams, and national teams representing Ukraine, China and Hongkong.

The teams that participated in the race were:

- Belkin Pro Cycling
- Team Novo Nordisk
- CCC–Polsat–Polkowice
- Champion System
- Crelan–Euphony
- Quantec-Indeland
- La Pomme Marseille
- Burgos BH–Castilla y Leon
- Drapac Cycling
- Gourmetfein–Simplon
- RTS–Santic Racing Team
- Ukraine national team
- Synergy Baku
- Atlas Personal–Jakroo
- Rietumu–Delfin
- Hongkong national team
- Hengxiang Cycling Team
- MAX Success Sports
- Chinese national team
- Hainan Yindongli Cycling Team

== Race overview ==
Stage	Date	Course	Distance	Type	Winner
1	20 October	Chengmai old Town to Chengmai	110.7 km (68.8 mi)	Flat stage	Moreno Hofland (NED)
2	21 October	Chengmai to Haikou	175 km (108.7 mi)	Flat stage	Theo Bos (NED)
3	22 October	Haikou to Qionghai	147.4 km (91.6 mi)	Flat stage	Theo Bos (NED)
4	23 October	Qionghai to Wanning	183 km (113.7 mi)	Flat stage	Theo Bos (NED)
5	24 October	Wanning to Sanya	218.6 km (135.8 mi)	Hilly stage	Theo Bos (NED)
6	25 October	Sanya to Wuzhishan	115.6 km (71.8 mi)	Hilly stage	Moreno Hofland (NED)
7	26 October	Wuzhishan to Dongfang	217.2 km (135.0 mi)	Hilly stage	Theo Bos (NED)
8	27 October	Dongfang to Danzhou	172.4 km (107.1 mi)	Hilly stage	Moreno Hofland (NED)
9	28 October	Danzhou to Chengmai	148 km (92.0 mi)	Flat stage	Theo Bos (NED)

== Classification leadership ==
Stage	Winner	General classification	Points classification	Mountains classification	Teams classification
1	Moreno Hofland	Moreno Hofland	Moreno Hofland	No mountains	Belkin Pro Cycling
2	Theo Bos	Moreno Hofland	Moreno Hofland	No mountains	Belkin Pro Cycling
3	Theo Bos	Moreno Hofland	Moreno Hofland	No mountains	Belkin Pro Cycling
4	Theo Bos	Moreno Hofland	Moreno Hofland	Vitaliy Buts	Belkin Pro Cycling
5	Theo Bos	Moreno Hofland	Moreno Hofland	Vitaliy Buts	Belkin Pro Cycling
6	Moreno Hofland	Moreno Hofland	Moreno Hofland	Vitaliy Buts	Belkin Pro Cycling
7	Theo Bos	Moreno Hofland	Moreno Hofland	Mateusz Taciak	Belkin Pro Cycling
8	Moreno Hofland	Moreno Hofland	Moreno Hofland	Mateusz Taciak	Belkin Pro Cycling
9	Theo Bos	Moreno Hofland	Moreno Hofland	Mateusz Taciak	Belkin Pro Cycling
Final		Moreno Hofland	Moreno Hofland	Mateusz Taciak	Belkin Pro Cycling
