= Sam Ligtlee =

Dutch cyclist (born 1997)

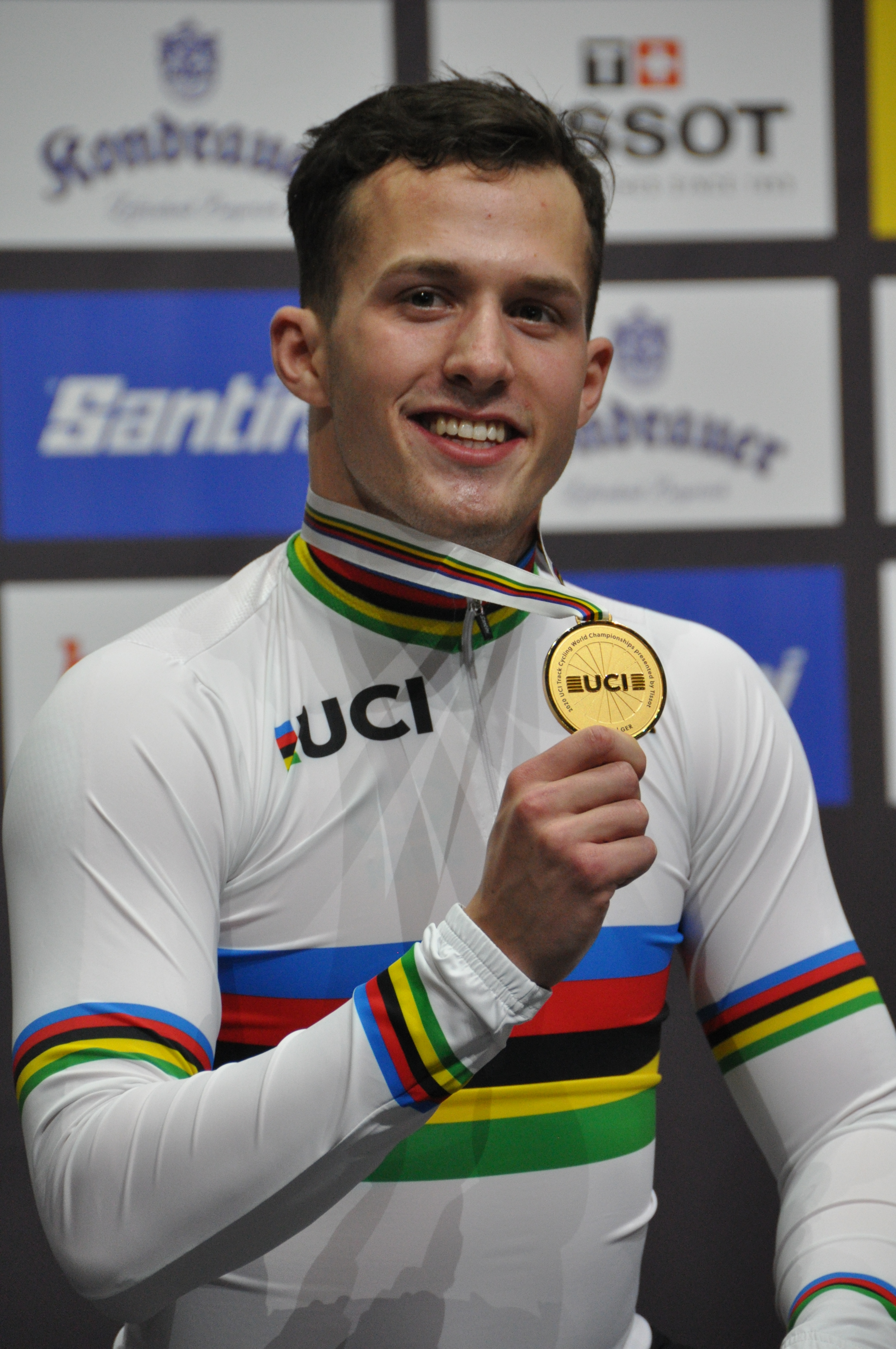
- Ligtlee in 2020

Personal information
- Born: 12 December 1997 (age 28) Eerbeek, Netherlands

Cycling career
- Sport: Cycling
- Discipline: Track
- Role: Rider
Medal record
Men's track cycling
Representing the Netherlands
Men's track cycling
World Championships
Gold medal – first place	2020 Berlin	1 km time trial
European Championships
Gold medal – first place	2021 Grenchen	Team sprint
Gold medal – first place	2022 Munich	Team sprint
Silver medal – second place	2021 Grenchen	1 km time trial
Bronze medal – third place	2018 Glasgow	1 km time trial

Sam Ligtlee (born 12 December 1997) is a Dutch track cyclist. In 2018, he won the bronze medal in the men's 1 km time trial event at the 2018 UEC European Track Championships.
