= Dmitry Kozonchuk =

Russian cyclist

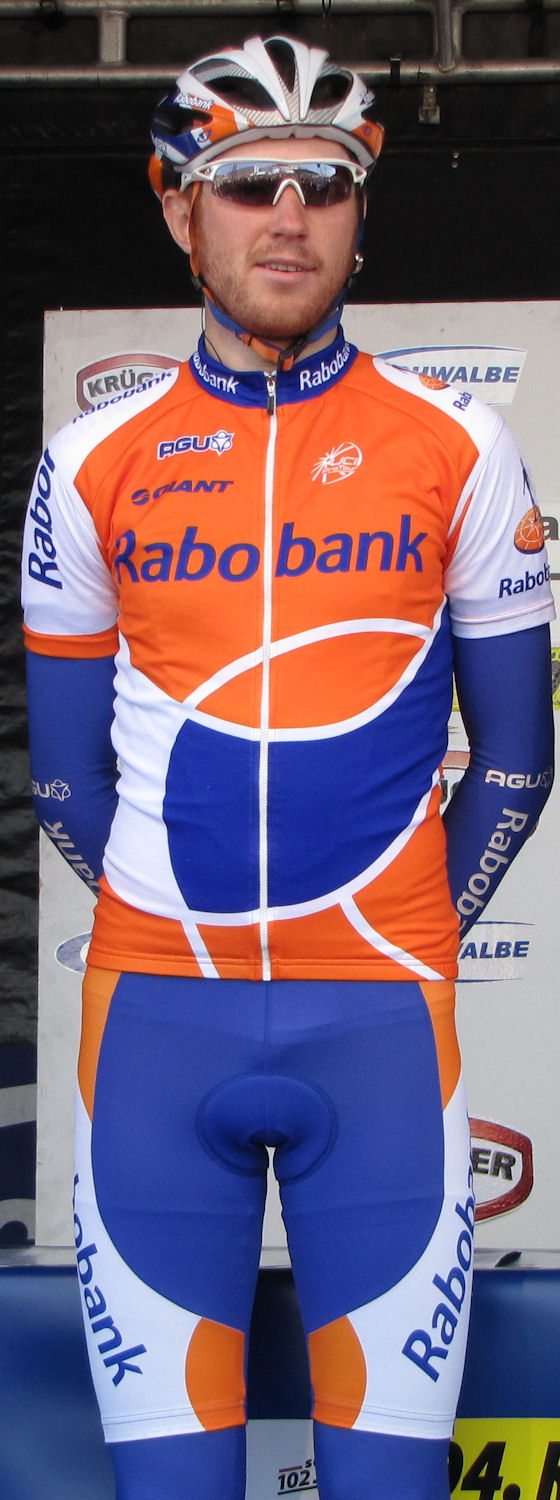

Personal information
- Full name: Dmitry Anatolyevich Kozonchuk; Дмитрий Анатольевич Козончук
- Born: 5 April 1984 (age 42): Voronezh, Soviet Union; (now Russia)
- Height: 1.87 m (6 ft 2 in)
- Weight: 75 kg (165 lb)

Cycling career
- Sport: Cycling
- Discipline: Road
- Role: Rider
- Rider type: All-rounder

Professional teams
- 2005–2006: Rabobank Continental Team
- 2007–2010: Rabobank
- 2011: Geox–TMC
- 2012: RusVelo
- 2013–2016: Team Katusha
- 2017–2018: Gazprom–RusVelo

Dmitry Anatolyevich Kozonchuk (Russian: Дмитрий Анатольевич Козончук; born 5 April 1984 in Voronezh) is a Russian professional road bicycle racer, who last rode for UCI Professional Continental team Gazprom–RusVelo.

In 2012, he rode for UCI Professional Continental Team RusVelo, before joining Team Katusha in 2013. He was named in the start list for the 2015 Tour de France.

== Major results ==
2002
8th Time trial, UCI Junior Road World Championships
2003
4th Flèche Ardennaise
2004
1st Stage 2 Olympia's Tour
1st Stage 3 Triptyque des Barrages
2005
1st Overall Cinturón a Mallorca

1st Stage 3

1st Paris–Roubaix Espoirs
7th Road race, UEC European Under-23 Road Championships
2006
2nd Overall Le Triptyque des Monts et Châteaux

1st Stages 2b & 3

2nd Overall Tour de la Somme
3rd Liège–Bastogne–Liège Espoirs
5th Overall Thüringen Rundfahrt der U23

1st Stage 2

8th Overall Vuelta Ciclista a León
2009
9th Hel van het Mergelland

=== Grand Tour general classification results timeline ===
Grand Tour	2007	2008	2009	2010	2011	2012	2013	2014	2015	2016	2017
Giro d'Italia	100	59	79	DNF	75	—	DNF	—	—	—	145
Tour de France	—	—	—	—	—	—	—	—	DNF	—	—
Vuelta a España	—	54	—	134	122	—	92	95	—	—	—

Legend
—	Did not compete
DNF	Did not finish
