= Moreno Hofland =

Dutch road bicycle racer

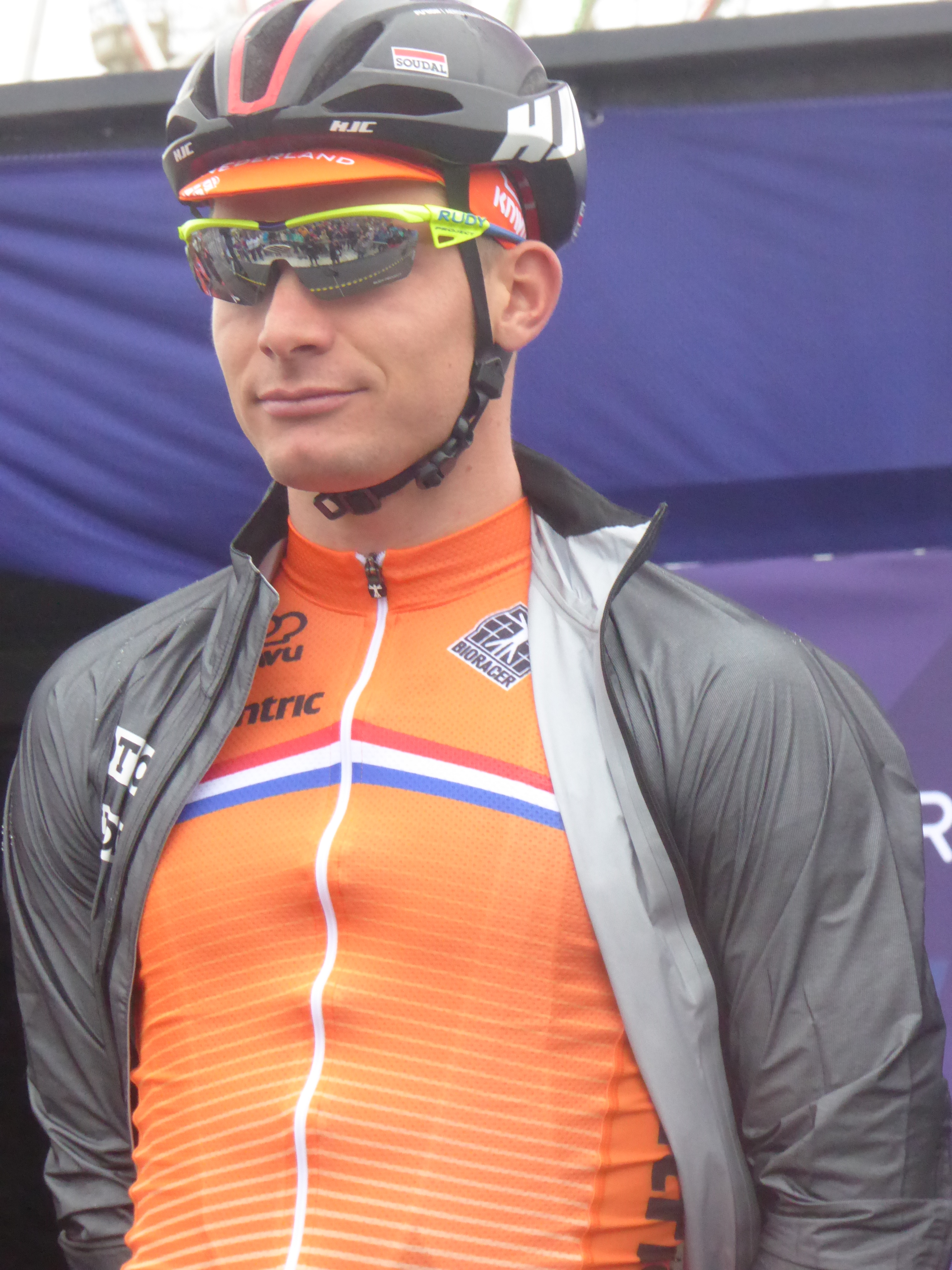
- Hofland at the 2018 European Road Cycling Championships

Personal information
- Full name: Moreno Hofland
- Born: 31 August 1991 (age 35) Roosendaal, Netherlands
- Height: 1.79 m (5 ft 10 in)
- Weight: 71 kg (157 lb)

Cycling career
- Sport: Cycling
- Discipline: Road
- Role: Rider
- Rider type: Sprinter

Professional teams
- 2010–2012: Rabobank Continental Team
- 2013–2016: Blanco Pro Cycling
- 2017–2018: Lotto–Soudal
- 2019–2021: EF Education First
Medal record
Representing Netherlands
Men's road bicycle racing
European Championships
Bronze medal – third place	2017 Herning	Road race

Moreno Hofland (born 31 August 1991) is a Dutch former professional road bicycle racer, who rode professionally between 2010 and 2021 for the Rabobank Continental Team, LottoNL–Jumbo, Lotto–Soudal and EF Education–Nippo teams.

During his professional career, Hofland took thirteen victories including five at the Tour of Hainan – four stage wins across the 2013 and 2014 races, and the general classification victory in 2013. As well as this, Hofland won the bronze medal in the road race at the 2017 European Road Championships in Denmark, and was the winner of the 2014 Volta Limburg Classic and 2017 Famenne Ardenne Classic one-day races.

== Career ==
In 2014 he took a stage win in Paris–Nice. In May 2015, Hofland gave his LottoNL–Jumbo team its first victory of the season by winning a bunch sprint on the second stage of the Tour de Yorkshire, taking off some pressure on the organization by media outlets. That season he also won a stage of the Ster ZLM Toer. He then joined Lotto–Soudal in 2017, staying with the team for two seasons and winning the Famenne Ardenne Classic in his first season with the Belgian squad. Hofland then joined EF Education First in 2019. After only starting three races in 2021, he announced his retirement from competition in September of that year, disclosing that he had been suffering from intestinal ischemia, which had disrupted his ability to train and race.

== Major results ==
2010
7th Overall Thüringen Rundfahrt der U23
2011
1st Stage 1 Tour de l'Avenir
1st Stage 3 (TTT) Vuelta Ciclista a León
2nd Overall Kreiz Breizh Elites

1st Stages 2 & 4

2nd Dorpenomloop Rucphen
8th Grand Prix de la Somme
2012
1st Road race, National Under-23 Road Championships
1st Stage 2 Tour de l'Avenir
1st Stage 1 (TTT) Thüringen Rundfahrt der U23
2nd Ster van Zwolle
4th Münsterland Giro
5th Overall Kreiz Breizh Elites

1st Stage 4

6th Paris–Roubaix Espoirs
7th Grand Prix Pino Cerami
10th Val d'Ille Classic
2013
1st Overall Tour of Hainan

1st Points classification
1st Stages 1, 6 & 8

8th Münsterland Giro
10th Grand Prix Impanis-Van Petegem
2014
1st Volta Limburg Classic
1st Stage 2 Paris–Nice
1st Stage 4 Vuelta a Andalucía
1st Stage 1 Tour of Hainan
Tour of Utah

1st Stages 1 & 3

2nd Kuurne–Brussels–Kuurne
6th Münsterland Giro
2015
1st Stage 2 Tour de Yorkshire
3rd Overall Ster ZLM Toer

1st Stage 3

9th RideLondon–Surrey Classic
2016
3rd Nationale Sluitingsprijs
2017
1st Famenne Ardenne Classic
3rd Road race, UEC European Road Championships
3rd Arnhem–Veenendaal Classic
4th Tacx Pro Classic
2018
8th Great War Remembrance Race
9th Handzame Classic
2019
2nd Road race, National Road Championships

=== Grand Tour general classification results timeline ===
Grand Tour	2014	2015	2016	2017
Giro d'Italia	—	136	DNF	139
Tour de France	—	—	—	—
Vuelta a España	DNF	—	—	—

Legend
—	Did not compete
DNF	Did not finish
