= Grischa Niermann =

German cyclist (born 1975)

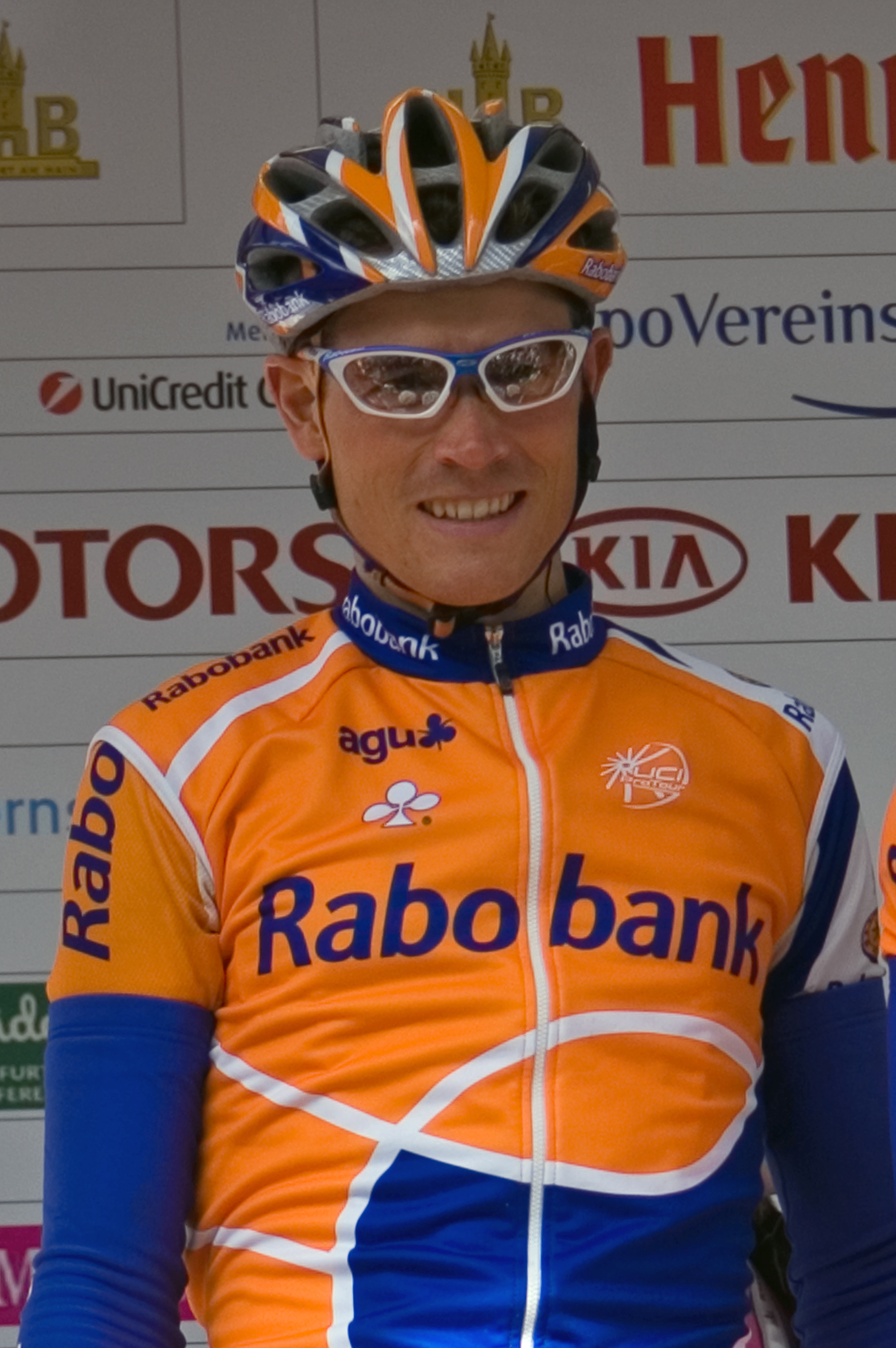
- Niermann at the 2006 Rund um den Henninger-Turm.

Personal information
- Full name: Grischa Niermann
- Born: 3 November 1975 (age 50) Hannover, Germany
- Height: 1.78 m (5 ft 10 in)
- Weight: 64 kg (141 lb)

Cycling career
- Sport: Cycling
- Current team: Rabobank Development Team
- Discipline: Road
- Role: Rider (retired); Race coach

Amateur team
- 1997–1998: Die Continentale

Professional team
- 1999–2012: Rabobank

Managerial team
- 2013–: Rabobank Development Team

Grischa Niermann (born 3 November 1975 in Hannover) is a German former professional road bicycle racer, who competed as a professional between 1999 and 2012. He started his career in 1997 with the Die Continentale team, where he won the Hessen-Rundfahrt in 1998. He moved to Rabobank in 1999, winning the Regio-Tour that year. His only victory after that with the Dutch squad was the Niedersachsen-Rundfahrt in 2001. Following his retirement after the 2012 Vuelta a España, he became part of the coaching staff at Rabobank Development Team. Since 2017 he is Racing Director at Visma-Lease a Bike.

As of June 1, 2026 Grischa Niermann departed Visma as their head of racing and joined Lidl-Trek as the team’s general manager.

He has confessed to doping with EPO during his career.

== Major results ==
- Regio-Tour – 1 stage (2008)
- Niedersachsen-Rundfahrt – Overall (2001)
- Regio-Tour – 1 stage & Overall (1999)
- Hessen Rundfahrt – 1 stage & Overall (1998)
- Volta ao Algarve – 1 stage (1998)
