= Maarten Wynants =

Belgian road bicycle racer

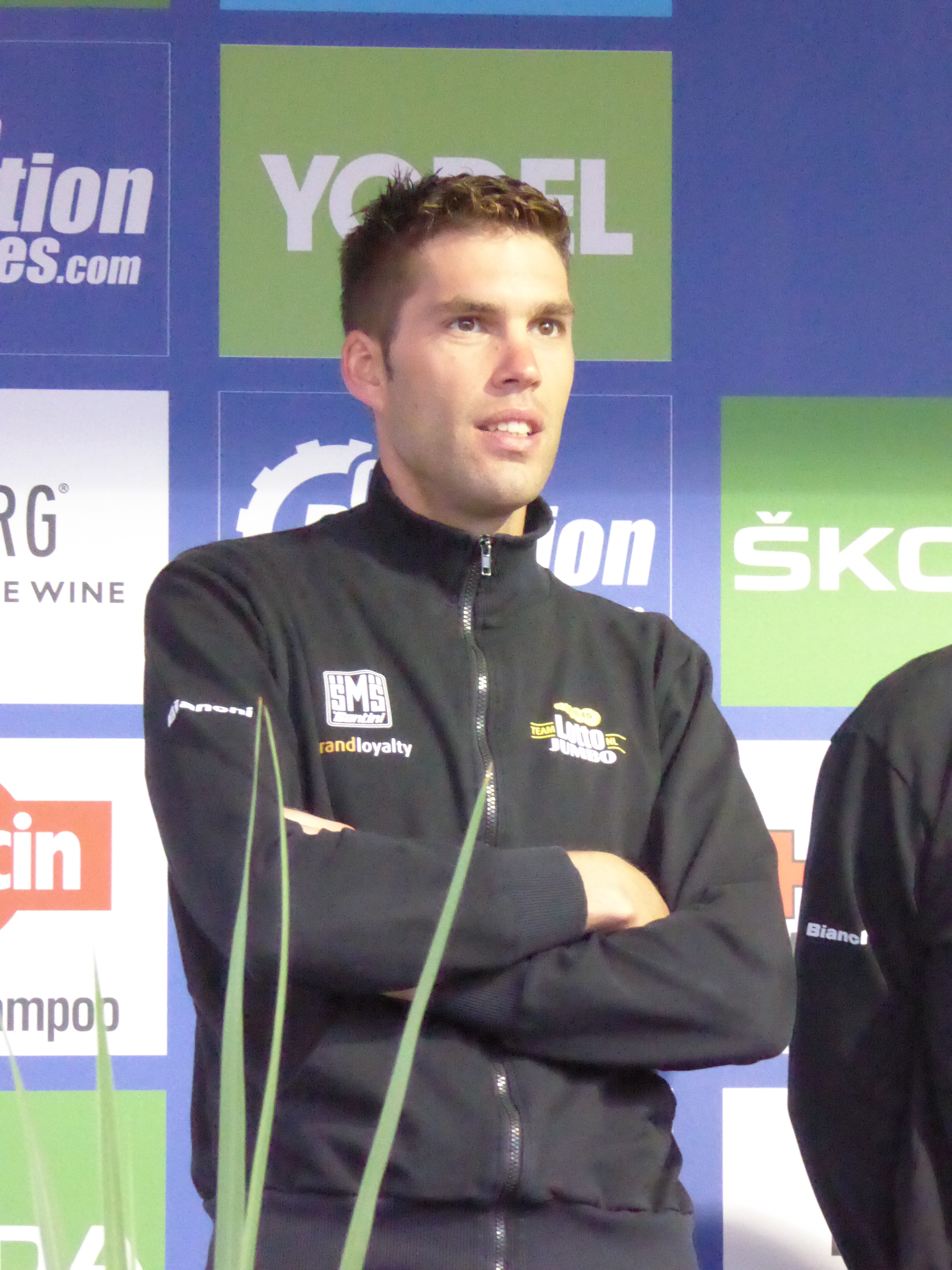
- Wynants at the 2016 Tour of Britain

Personal information
- Full name: Maarten Wynants
- Born: 13 May 1982 (age 44) Hasselt, Belgium
- Height: 1.90 m (6 ft 3 in)
- Weight: 74 kg (163 lb; 11.7 st)

Cycling career
- Sport: Cycling
- Current team: Visma–Lease a Bike
- Discipline: Road
- Role: Rider (retired); Directeur sportif

Amateur team
- 2004: Jong Vlaanderen 2016

Professional teams
- 2005–2006: Chocolade Jacques–T Interim
- 2007–2010: Quick-Step–Innergetic
- 2011–2021: Rabobank

Managerial team
- 2021–: Team Jumbo–Visma

Maarten Wynants (born 13 May 1982) is a Belgian former professional road bicycle racer, who rode professionally between 2005 and 2021 for the Chocolade Jacques–Topsport Vlaanderen, Quick-Step and Team Jumbo–Visma teams. He now works as a directeur sportif for his final professional team, UCI WorldTeam Visma–Lease a Bike.

== Career ==
Born in Hasselt, Wynants was awarded the Combativity award, given to a rider judged to have shown exceptional attacking spirit during the race, following Stage 1 of the 2010 Tour de France on 4 July. Attacking in the first kilometre, he continued to lead from the front until both he and Alexandr Pliushin of Team Katusha were caught by the peloton just 10 kilometres (6.2 miles) from the end of the 225.5-kilometre (140.1-mile) stage.

In June 2020, Wynants announced that he would retire from cycling in April 2021, after that year's Paris–Roubaix. Following the postponement of Paris–Roubaix to October due to the COVID-19 pandemic in France, Wynants' final race occurred at the Tour of Flanders.

== Major results ==
2004
1st Road race, National Under-23 Road Championships
10th Grand Prix de Waregem
2005
3rd Hel van het Mergelland
2006
1st Grote Prijs Beeckman-De Caluwé
7th Overall Ster Elektrotoer
2007
3rd Halle–Ingooigem
5th Overall Ster Elektrotoer
9th Overall Circuit Franco-Belge
10th Overall Volta ao Algarve
2008
3rd Trofeo Sóller
5th Le Samyn
6th Paris–Brussels
6th Grand Prix de Fourmies
2010
Combativity award Stage 1 Tour de France
2011
7th Overall Tour of Belgium
2012
3rd Overall Tour de l'Eurométropole
7th Binche–Tournai–Binche
8th Dwars door Vlaanderen
10th Overall Tour of Belgium
10th Paris–Roubaix
2013
2nd Trofeo Platja de Muro
9th Omloop Het Nieuwsblad
2014
6th Kuurne–Brussels–Kuurne
2016
9th Le Samyn
9th Tour de l'Eurométropole
2017
2nd Omloop van het Houtland
3rd Omloop Mandel-Leie-Schelde
2018
1st Stage 5 (TTT) Tour of Britain

=== Grand Tour general classification results timeline ===
| Grand Tour | 2009 | 2010 | 2011 | 2012 | 2013 | 2014 | 2015 | 2016 |
|---|---|---|---|---|---|---|---|---|
| Giro d'Italia | — | — | — | — | DNF | — | — | — |
| Tour de France | — | 116 | — | DNF | 132 | 117 | — | 138 |
| / Vuelta a España | 113 | — | — | — | — | — | DNF | — |

Legend
| — | Did not compete |
| DNF | Did not finish |
