= Jetse Bol =

Dutch racing cyclist (born 1989)

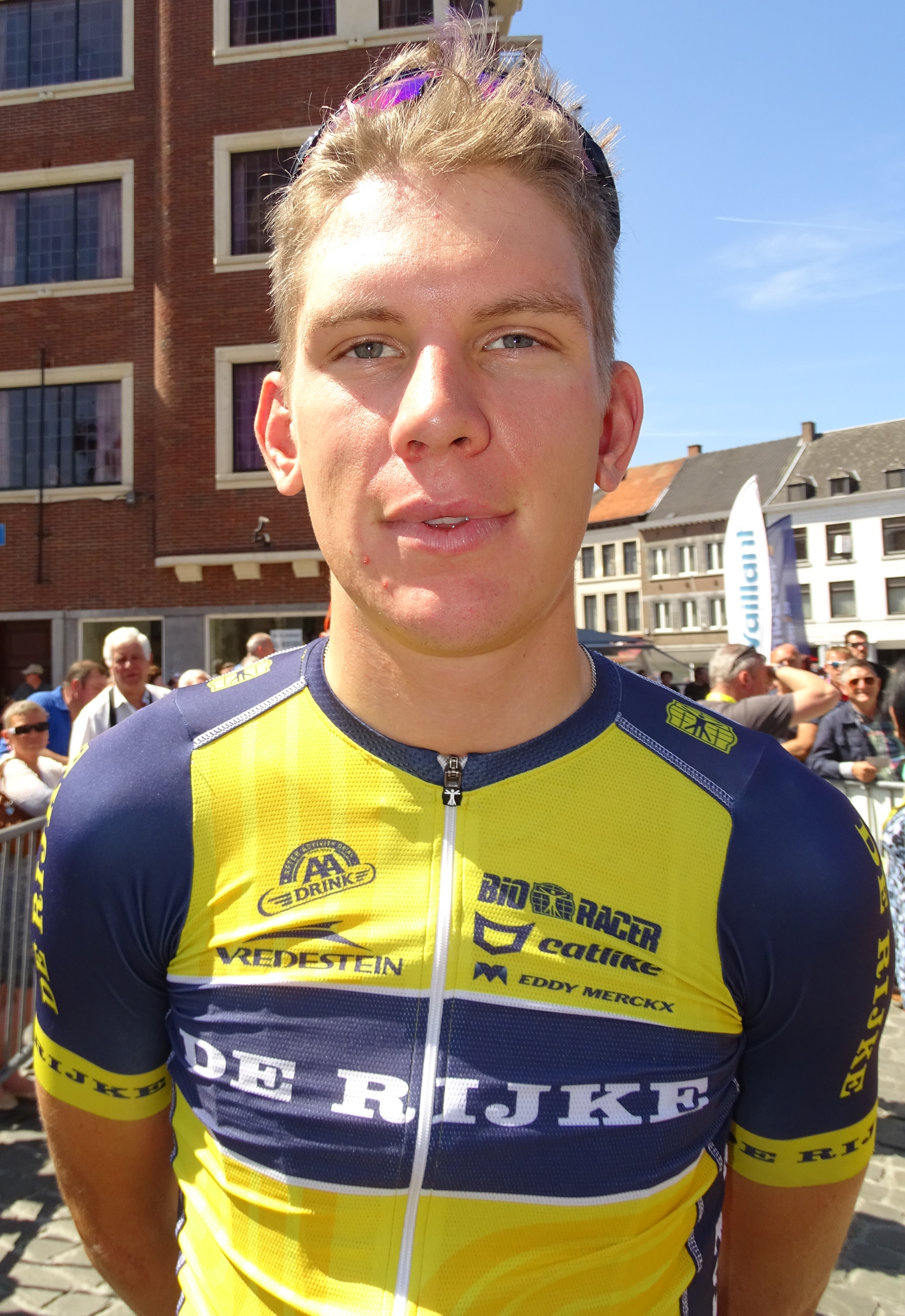
- Bol at the 2015 Ronde van Limburg

Personal information
- Full name: Jetse Bol
- Born: 8 September 1989 (age 37) Avenhorn, the Netherlands
- Height: 1.84 m (6 ft 0 in)
- Weight: 73 kg (161 lb)

Cycling career
- Sport: Cycling
- Current team: Retired
- Discipline: Road
- Role: Rider

Amateur teams
- 2008–2011: Rabobank Continental Team
- 2010: Rabobank (stagiaire)
- 2011: Rabobank (stagiaire)

Professional teams
- 2012–2014: Rabobank
- 2015–2016: Cyclingteam de Rijke
- 2017–2018: Team Manzana Postobón
- 2018–2024: Burgos BH

Managerial team
- 2025–: Burgos Burpellet BH

Jetse Bol (born 8 September 1989 in Avenhorn) is a retired Dutch professional road bicycle racer, who last rode for UCI ProTeam Burgos Burpellet BH. He now works as an assistant sports director in the team. As a young boy, Bol was a talented speed skater but later switched to cycling.

== Major results ==
2006
2nd Time trial, National Junior Road Championships
2007
3rd Overall Driedaagse van Axel
2008
8th Paris–Roubaix Espoirs
2009
1st Overall Olympia's Tour

1st Prologue (TTT)

4th Overall Boucles de la Mayenne
2010
1st Overall Le Triptyque des Monts et Châteaux

1st Stage 2a (ITT)

5th Overall Tour de Normandie

1st Stage 1 (ITT)

5th Paris–Roubaix Espoirs
6th Kampioenschap van Vlaanderen
8th Overall Tour de Bretagne

1st Stage 1

2011
1st Overall Olympia's Tour

1st Stages 1 & 6

2nd Omloop der Kempen
3rd Kernen Omloop Echt-Susteren
4th Overall Tour de Bretagne

1st Stages 1 & 3

5th Ster van Zwolle
6th Overall Ronde van Drenthe
6th Châteauroux Classic
7th Paris–Roubaix Espoirs
2012
10th Grand Prix Impanis-Van Petegem
2013
7th Binche–Chimay–Binche
10th Overall Tour de l'Eurométropole
2015
1st Overall Olympia's Tour

1st Stage 2

2016
10th Ronde van Limburg
2017
6th Prueba Villafranca de Ordizia
7th Overall Circuit de la Sarthe
10th Overall Vuelta a Burgos
2018
Combativity award Stage 18 Vuelta a España
2019
4th Prueba Villafranca de Ordizia
6th Circuito de Getxo
2020
6th Prueba Villafranca de Ordizia
Combativity award Stage 1 Vuelta a España
2021
Combativity award Stage 16 Vuelta a España
2022
Combativity award Stages 2 & 11 Vuelta a España
2023
1st Mountains classification, Vuelta a Castilla y León
9th Classic Grand Besançon Doubs
10th Tour du Doubs
Combativity award Stage 12 Vuelta a España

=== Grand Tour general classification results timeline ===
Grand Tour	2014	2015	2016	2017	2018	2019	2020	2021	2022	2023
Giro d'Italia	156	—	—	—	—	—	—	—	—	—
Tour de France	Has not contested during his career									
Vuelta a España	—	—	—	69	101	104	80	71	89	110

Legend
—	Did not compete
DNF	Did not finish
IP	Race in Progress
