= Marc Goos =

Dutch cyclist

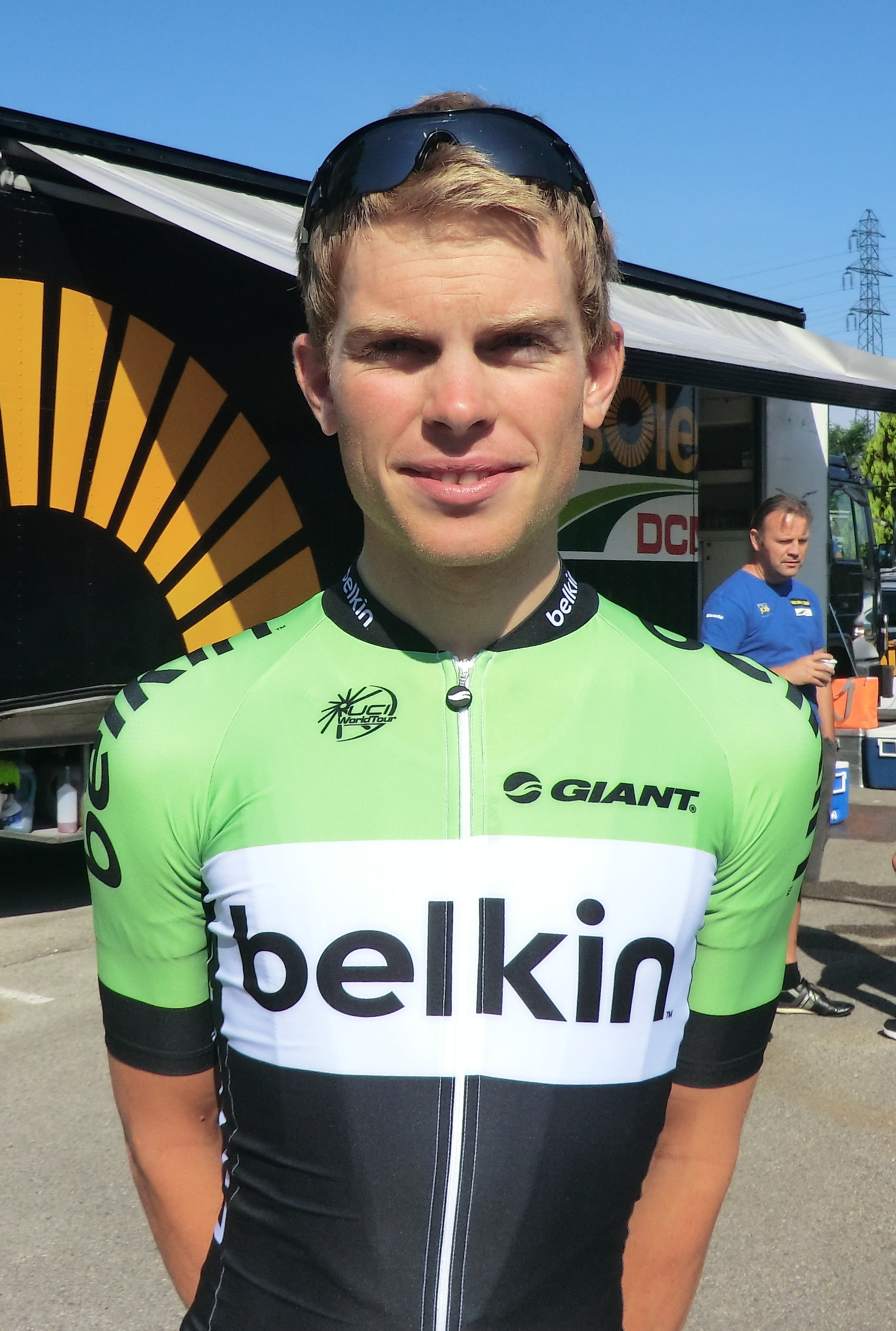
- Goos at the 2013 Tour de l'Ain

Personal information
- Full name: Marc Goos
- Born: 30 November 1990 (age 35) Breda, Netherlands

Cycling career
- Sport: Cycling
- Discipline: Road
- Role: Rider
- Rider type: Road bicycle racing

Professional teams
- 2010: Cycling Team Jo Piels
- 2011–2012: Rabobank Continental Team
- 2013–2015: Blanco Pro Cycling

Marc Goos (born 30 November 1990) is a Dutch racing cyclist who rode most recently for the UCI ProTour team, LottoNL–Jumbo. He competed in the 2014 Giro d'Italia and finished in 35th position.

== Major results ==
2010
9th Overall Flèche du Sud
2011
1st Overall Vuelta Ciclista a León
7th Overall Rhône-Alpes Isère Tour
2012
3rd Overall Le Triptyque des Monts et Châteaux
5th Overall Tour of China
6th Overall Tour du Poitou-Charentes
