= Tom Leezer =

Dutch road bicycle racer (born 1985)

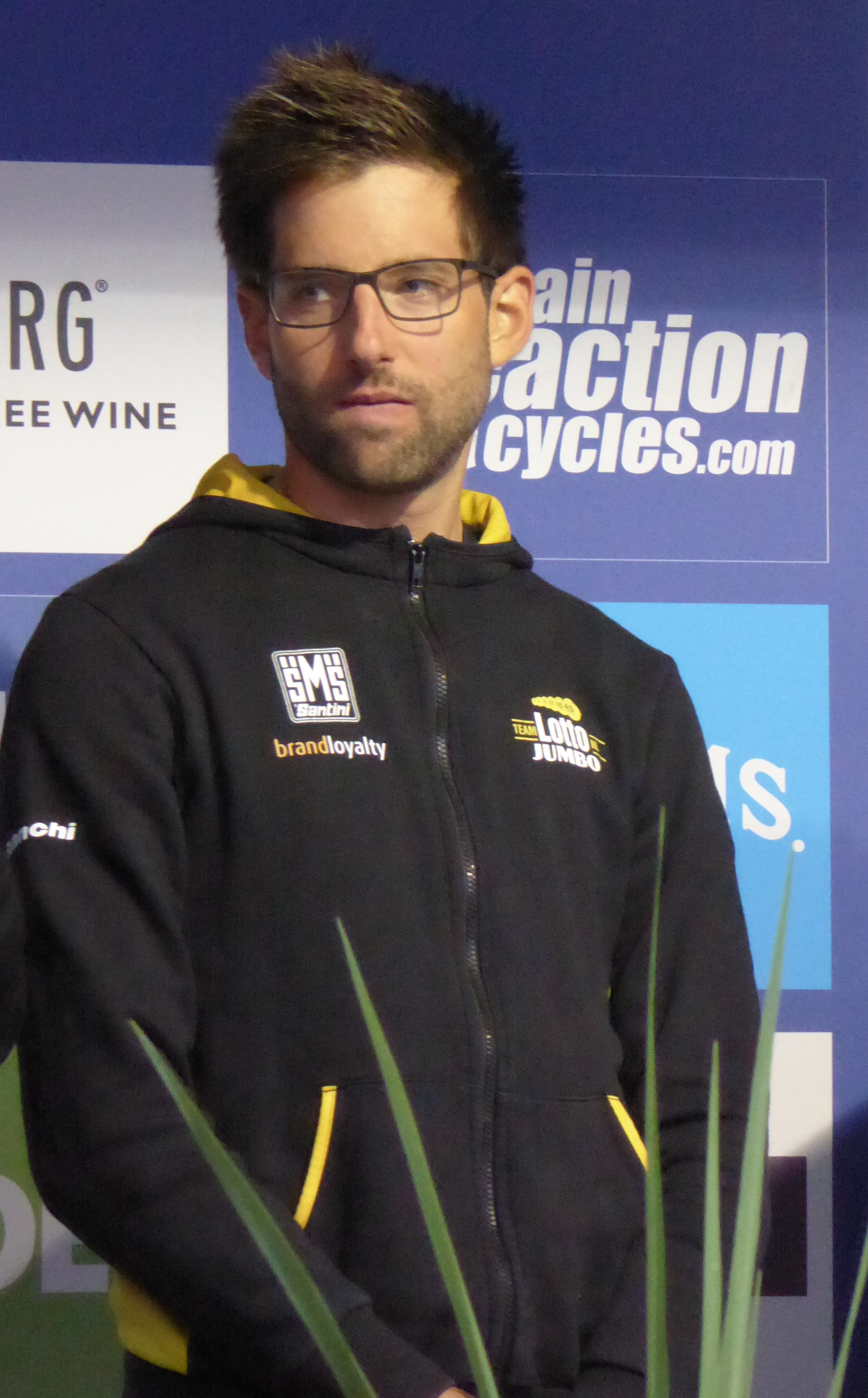
- Leezer at the 2016 Tour of Britain

Personal information
- Full name: Thomas Leezer
- Born: 26 December 1985 (age 40) Delft, Netherlands
- Height: 1.85 m (6 ft 1 in)
- Weight: 76 kg (168 lb; 12.0 st)

Cycling career
- Sport: Cycling
- Current team: Royal Dutch Cycling Union
- Discipline: Road
- Role: Rider (retired); Coach

Professional teams
- 2004: Van Vliet–EBH Advocaten
- 2005–2007: Rabobank Continental Team
- 2008–2020: Rabobank

Managerial team
- 2025–: Royal Dutch Cycling Union (junior coach)

Thomas Leezer (born 26 December 1985) is a Dutch retired road bicycle racer, who competed between 2004 and 2020, for the Van Vliet–EBH Advocaten, Rabobank Continental Team and Team Jumbo–Visma squads.

Leezer grew up in 's-Gravenzande, where his father was a veterinary surgeon.

During his professional career, Leezer took one individual victory on stage six of the 2013 Tour de Langkawi, winning after a 7-kilometre (4.3-mile) solo move. He also competed at eight Grand Tours – including wearing the mountains classification jersey at the 2009 Vuelta a España – as well as the team time trial at the UCI Road World Championships on four occasions, and the road race at the 2016 UCI Road World Championships. At the latter race, he almost became World champion after escaping from the leading group and was only overtaken a few hundred meters ahead of the finish line.

Following his retirement from cycling, Leezer co-founded Dutch cycling clothing brand Velor, and in 2025, became the national junior coach for the Royal Dutch Cycling Union.

== Major results ==
2003
1st Road race, National Junior Road Championships
1st Grand Prix Bati-Metallo
9th Road race, UCI Junior Road World Championships
2004
1st Stage 2 Cinturón a Mallorca
6th Liège–Bastogne–Liège U23
2005
2nd Overall Triptyque des Barrages Under-23

1st Stage 1

10th Road race, National Under-23 Road Championships
2006
2nd Road race, National Under-23 Road Championships
4th Overall Olympia's Tour
5th Paris–Tours Espoirs
8th Overall Tour de la Somme
8th Omloop der Kempen
10th Omloop van het Houtland
2007
1st Road race, National Under-23 Road Championships
1st Overall Le Triptyque des Monts et Châteaux

1st Stage 2a (ITT)

1st Stage 6 Vuelta a Navarra
3rd Overall Tour de Normandie
3rd Grand Prix de la Ville de Lillers
4th Road race, UCI Under-23 Road World Championships
5th Overall Olympia's Tour

1st Stage 2

6th Beverbeek Classic
6th Omloop der Kempen
2009
2nd Trofeo Pollença
3rd Overall Three Days of De Panne
4th Tour de Rijke
5th Kuurne–Brussels–Kuurne
6th Dutch Food Valley Classic
7th Trofeo Calvia
8th Trofeo Cala
8th Gent–Wevelgem
Vuelta a España

Held after Stages 2–3

2010
7th Vattenfall Cyclassics
9th Dutch Food Valley Classic
2011
1st Stage 1 (TTT) Tirreno–Adriatico
8th Dwars door Vlaanderen
9th Trofeo Magaluf-Palmanova
2013
1st Stage 6 Tour de Langkawi
3rd Overall Tour of Hainan
10th Grote Prijs Jef Scherens
2019
1st Stage 1 (TTT) UAE Tour

=== Grand Tour general classification results timeline ===
| Grand Tour | 2009 | 2010 | 2011 | 2012 | 2013 | 2014 | 2015 | 2016 | 2017 | 2018 | 2019 |
|---|---|---|---|---|---|---|---|---|---|---|---|
| Giro d'Italia | — | — | — | DNF | — | — | — | — | — | — | 119 |
| Tour de France | — | — | — | — | 150 | 133 | 153 | — | 166 | — | — |
| / Vuelta a España | 129 | — | — | — | — | — | — | — | — | 139 | — |

Legend
| — | Did not compete |
| DNF | Did not finish |
