= Theo Bos =

Dutch road and track cyclist

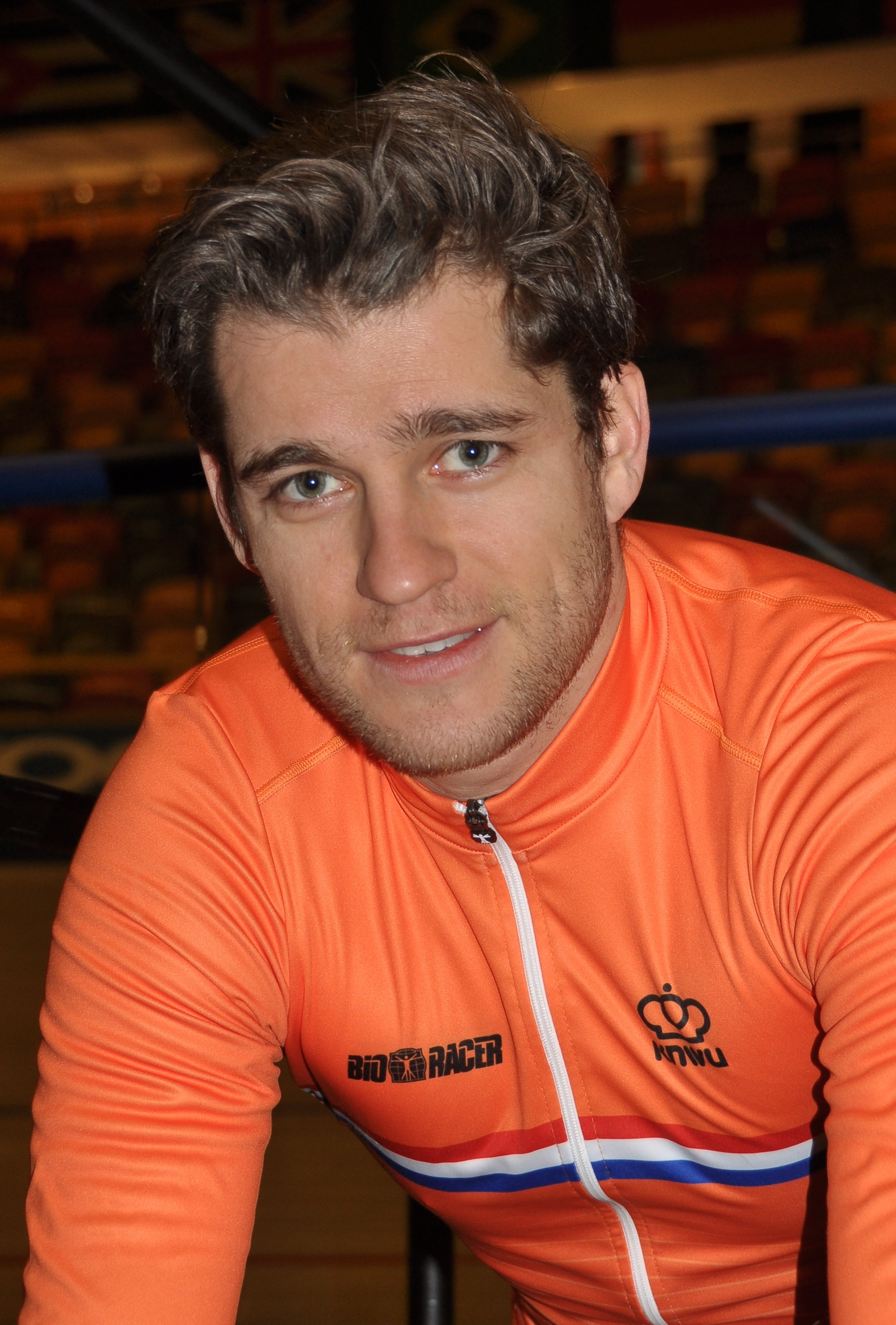
- Bos in 2018

Personal information
- Born: 22 August 1983 (age 43) Hierden, Netherlands
- Height: 1.90 m (6 ft 3 in)
- Weight: 77 kg (170 lb)

Cycling career
- Sport: Cycling
- Current team: Retired
- Disciplines: Road (former); Track
- Role: Rider
- Rider type: Sprinter

Amateur team
- 2017: BEAT Cycling Club

Professional teams
- 2009: Rabobank Continental Team
- 2010: Cervélo TestTeam
- 2011–2014: Rabobank
- 2015–2016: MTN–Qhubeka
- 2018–2021: BEAT Cycling Club
Medal record
Men's track cycling
Representing Netherlands
Olympic Games
Silver medal – second place	2004 Athens	Sprint
World Championships
Gold medal – first place	2004 Melbourne	Sprint
Gold medal – first place	2005 Los Angeles	1 km time trial
Gold medal – first place	2006 Bordeaux	Sprint
Gold medal – first place	2006 Bordeaux	Keirin
Gold medal – first place	2007 Palma de Mallorca	Sprint
Silver medal – second place	2005 Los Angeles	Team sprint
Silver medal – second place	2007 Palma de Mallorca	Keirin
Silver medal – second place	2016 London	1 km time trial
Silver medal – second place	2017 Hong Kong	Team sprint
Silver medal – second place	2019 Pruszków	1 km time trial
Bronze medal – third place	2004 Melbourne	1 km time trial
Bronze medal – third place	2008 Manchester	Team sprint
Bronze medal – third place	2011 Apeldoorn	Madison
Bronze medal – third place	2018 Apeldoorn	1 km time trial
European Championships
Silver medal – second place	2019 Apeldoorn	1 km time trial

Theo Bos (born 22 August 1983) is a Dutch former professional road and track cyclist. An Olympic silver medalist and five-time world champion, he is the brother of Olympic medalist in speed skating Jan Bos.

On 29 November 2021, he announced his retirement from professional cycling and took up the job of coach of the Chinese national track team.

== Early life ==
Bos was born in Hierden, Netherlands. He has an older brother Jan Bos, who is a professional speed skater.

He went to high school in Harderwijk, where he got a havo diploma. Later he also got a vwo diploma.

In 2001, he was Junior World Champion track cycling at 1,000 m. The same year, at the age of 18, he started his professional cycling career as a senior.

== Professional career ==
=== Track cycling ===
He won the silver medal at the 2004 Summer Olympics in the sprint event.

He won an individual gold in the sprint at the 2004 UCI Track Cycling World Championships. The following year, he won the individual sprint and a silver medal in the team sprint at the 2005 UCI Track Cycling World Championships.

At the 2006 UCI Track Cycling World Championships, Bos won the keirin and completed a career triple, having been world champion in the sprint, kilo and keirin. He won the keirin after accelerating with two laps to go, winning by a wide margin and able to raise his hands and salute the crowd as he passed the finish line. His French rival, and bronze medal winner, Arnaud Tournant, said Bos' performance was "the best I've seen in a very long time."

On 16 December 2006, Bos broke the world 200m track record during qualification rounds for the sprint at a World Cup meeting in Moscow. Bos clocked 9.772 seconds (after a computer initially had given him an unlikely 9.086 seconds) and beat the 11-year record held by Canadian Curt Harnett. Bos declared the 200m the "ultimate record" for track cyclists. Five days later Bos was elected Dutch Sportsman of the year. Bos' record was beaten by Frenchman Kévin Sireau at the Moscow Grand Prix on 29 May 2009 with 9.65 seconds.

Starting August 2017, Bos started riding for BEAT Cycling Club. He is in a team with Matthijs Büchli and Roy van den Berg. In 2017 Bos won the Dutch Championships in the team sprint with Büchli and van den Berg. At the 2018 UCI Track Cycling World Championships in Apeldoorn he won a bronze medal in the individual 1 km time trial.

=== Road cycling ===
On 19 April 2009, Bos was in a controversial crash in the final 800m of the final stage of the Tour of Turkey. Bos caused the crash of the eventual winner Daryl Impey by grabbing Impey's left shoulder with his right hand. Impey crashed to the left, into the barrier, next to Bos. Bos admitted pushing Impey. Bos claimed the reason for pushing Impey was because Impey was moving in on him while he was already close to the fence. Bos was disqualified and fined. On 1 May 2009 the Union Cycliste Internationale (UCI) said "Bos’s behavior undermined the image, reputation and interests of cycling". Bos was charged with an infringement and was brought before a UCI disciplinary hearing in which he was found guilty of violating UCI regulations. Bos was subsequently suspended from professional racing from 15 August through 14 September 2009.

In the off season before 2010 Bos signed with the Cervélo TestTeam, that included former Tour de France winner Carlos Sastre. He was touted as another addition to their sprint team. He raced in many smaller races, and some large ones including Paris–Roubaix and the Vuelta a España. When the Cervelo Test Team folded in late 2010, Bos returned to the Rabobank team. His first triumph of 2011 came in the first stage of the Tour of Oman, beating Mark Cavendish in a sprint finish.

In 2012, he won the first and last stages of the Tour of Turkey. Both of these stages saw crashes in the finale, diminishing the number of sprinters Bos had to compete against. Bos took his first win at World Tour level at the Eneco Tour. On Stage 3 from Riemst to Genk, he edged John Degenkolb (Argos–Shimano) on the finish line in a bunch sprint to take the victory.

Bos was originally selected as a member of the Belkin squad for the 2013 Vuelta a España, however he was withdrawn before the start of the race after tests revealed he had low cortisol levels. A team statement noted that this was "an indication of sub-optimal health conditions", and that whilst low cortisol levels were not a barrier to competing in UCI World Tour races the team's medical staff and Bos had agreed to send him home. Subsequently, Bos confirmed that his condition was due to an extreme reaction to asthma medication.

Bos rode for the Pro Continental team MTN–Qhubeka in 2015 and 2016. Bos said about Team MTN-Qhubeka "The team has a great culture, I want to win and we will work together to win, our success is the success of Africa."

""The team races for a cause that is more than just winning races and that is Qhubeka, a social initiative where they aim to put children in Africa on bicycles. I really like this human element to the team. I hope I will be able to bring a fan base with me to the team that will bring new support to the Qhubeka initiative. "

— Theo Bos

Following the 2015 Abu Dhabi Tour, where he did not finish stage 2, he had no further results at any major road events.

== Major results ==
=== Track ===
2001
1st Kilo, UCI Juniors World Championships
2002
UEC European Under-23 Championships

1st Keirin
2nd Kilo
2nd Sprint

National Championships

1st Keirin
1st Sprint

2003
UEC European Under-23 Championships

1st Kilo
1st Sprint
2nd Keirin

National Championships

1st Keirin
1st Kilo
1st Sprint

2nd Kilo, UCI World Cup Classics, Moscow
2004
UCI World Championships

1st Sprint
3rd Kilo

National Championships

1st Keirin
1st Sprint

2004 UCI World Cup Classics

1st Kilo, Moscow
2nd Kilo, Manchester
2nd Team sprint, Moscow
3rd Sprint, Moscow

2004–05 UCI World Cup Classics, Los Angeles

1st Kilo
1st Team sprint

2nd Sprint, Olympic Games
2005
UCI World Championships

1st Kilo
2nd Team sprint

2004–05 UCI World Cup Classics, Sydney

1st Keirin
1st Sprint

2005–06 UCI World Cup Classics, Manchester

1st Sprint
2nd Team sprint

2006
UCI World Championships

1st Keirin
1st Sprint

National Championships

1st Keirin
1st Sprint

2005–06 UCI World Cup Classics, Sydney

1st Keirin
1st Team sprint

2006–07 UCI World Cup Classics

1st Keirin, Sydney
1st Sprint, Moscow
2nd Team sprint, Sydney
2nd Team sprint, Moscow

2007
UCI World Championships

1st Sprint
2nd Keirin

National Championships

1st Keirin
1st Sprint

1st Masters of Sprint
1st Rotterdam Sprint Cup
2008
3rd Team sprint, UCI World Championships
2010
1st Madison, National Championships (with Peter Schep)
2011
3rd Madison, UCI World Championships (with Peter Schep)
2012
2nd Kilo, National Championships
2015
National Championships

1st Kilo
1st Omnium
1st Sprint

2016
2nd Kilo, UCI World Championships
2017
1st Team sprint, National Championships (with Matthijs Büchli and Roy van den Berg)
2nd Team sprint, UCI World Championships
2nd Team sprint, 2017–18 UCI World Cup, Manchester (with Matthijs Büchli and Roy van den Berg)
2018
2017–18 UCI World Cup, Minsk

1st Team sprint (with Matthijs Büchli and Roy van den Berg)
3rd Sprint

2018–19 UCI World Cup

2nd Team sprint, Milton
3rd Keirin, London
3rd Kilo, Berlin

1st Team sprint, National Championships (with Matthijs Büchli and Roy van den Berg)
3rd Kilo, UCI World Championships
2019
1st Keirin, 2018–19 UCI World Cup, Hong Kong
2nd Kilo, UCI World Championships
2nd Kilo, UEC European Championships

=== Road ===
2009
1st Ronde van Noord-Holland
1st Omloop der Kempen
Olympia's Tour

1st Prologue (TTT), Stages 1, 2 & 4

3rd Ronde van Overijssel
4th Beverbeek Classic
2010
1st Clásica de Almería
Vuelta a Castilla y León

1st Points classification
1st Stages 1 & 2

1st Stage 5 Vuelta a Murcia
2011
1st Tour de Rijke
1st Dutch Food Valley Classic
Tour of Oman

1st Stages 1 & 3

1st Stage 6 Danmark Rundt
2nd Overall Delta Tour Zeeland
6th Handzame Classic
8th Scheldeprijs
2012
1st Dwars door Drenthe
1st Dutch Food Valley Classic
1st Memorial Rik Van Steenbergen
Tour of Turkey

1st Stages 1 & 8

1st Stage 3 Eneco Tour
1st Stage 2 World Ports Classic
3rd Scheldeprijs
2013
Tour of Hainan

1st Stages 2, 3, 4, 5, 7 & 9

Tour de Langkawi

1st Stages 1 & 2

1st Stage 1 Critérium International
1st Stage 2 Volta ao Algarve
1st Stage 2 Ster ZLM Toer
1st Stage 3 Tour of Norway
8th Scheldeprijs
9th Ronde van Zeeland Seaports
2014
1st Overall World Ports Classic

1st Points classification

1st Ronde van Zeeland Seaports
Tour de Langkawi

1st Stages 2, 7, 8 & 9

1st Stage 3 Tour de Pologne
1st Stage 4 Tour of Alberta
2nd Handzame Classic
3rd Overall Tour de l'Eurométropole

1st Stage 3

==== Grand Tour general classification results timeline ====
Grand Tour	2010	2011	2012
Giro d'Italia	—	—	DNF
Tour de France	—	—	—
Vuelta a España	DNF	—	—

Legend
—	Did not compete
DNF	Did not finish

Records
Preceded by Curt Harnett	Men's 200 meter Time Trial world record holder 16 December 2006 – 29 May 2009	Succeeded by Kévin Sireau
