= 2015 Tour de Suisse =

Cycling race

2015 UCI World Tour, race 17 of 28
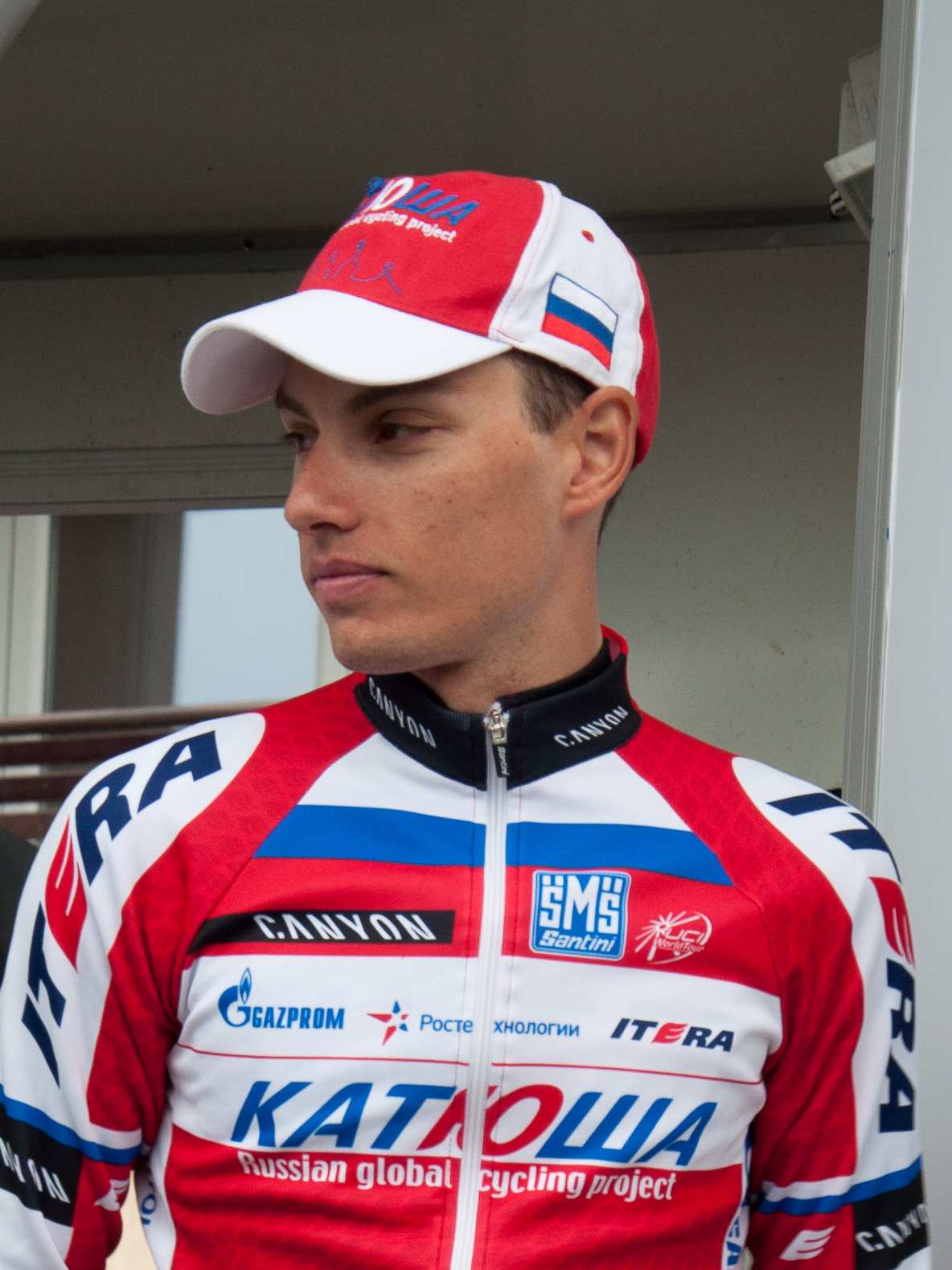
- Simon Špilak won the 2015 Tour de Suisse

Race details
- Dates: 13–21 June 2015
- Stages: 9
- Distance: 1,262.6 km (784.5 mi)
- Winning time: 30h 15' 09"

Results
Jersey awarded to the overall winner	Winner	Simon Špilak (SLO)	(Team Katusha)
	Second	Geraint Thomas (GBR)	(Team Sky)
	Third	Tom Dumoulin (NED)	(Team Giant–Alpecin)
Jersey awarded to the mountains classification winner	Mountains	Thomas De Gendt (Note: Stefan Denifl's results were expunged following his four-year suspension for blood doping in June 2019.) (BEL)	(Lotto–Soudal)
Jersey awarded to the sprints classification winner	Sprints	Peter Sagan (SVK)	(Tinkoff–Saxo)
	Team	Team Sky	

The 2015 Tour de Suisse was the 79th edition of the Tour de Suisse stage race. It took place from 13 to 21 June and was the seventeenth race of the 2015 UCI World Tour. It started in Risch-Rotkreuz and finished in Bern. The race was composed of nine stages including two time trials, a short one on the first day and a long one on the last day. The event covered 1,262.6 kilometres (785 miles), and visited Liechtenstein and Austria on its fifth stage, which was the race's sole mountaintop finish.

The winner of the general classification was Slovenian Simon Špilak of Team Katusha, who won the race by a margin of only five seconds from Great Britain's Geraint Thomas (Team Sky). The ultimate selection was made on the last day's individual time trial. Tom Dumoulin of the Team Giant–Alpecin squad rounded up the podium, having won the two individual time trial stages that bookended the race.

The mountains classification was initially awarded to Austria's Stefan Denifl (IAM Cycling), who featured in many breakaways to amass his points. Denifl was later disqualified following his suspension for doping in 2019. The sprints classification was won by Slovakian Peter Sagan (Tinkoff–Saxo) who also was the victor of two stages. Team Sky finished at the head of the team classification with a margin of 11 minutes and 49 seconds.

Other riders who won a stage were Croatian Kristijan Đurasek of Lampre–Merida, Australian Michael Matthews (Orica–GreenEDGE), Norwegian Alexander Kristoff (Team Katusha) and Kazakh Alexey Lutsenko of Astana. Frenchman Thibaut Pinot grabbed the queen stage to the Rettenbach glacier and held the leader's jersey for four stages, but had to surrender it on the last day of competition to Špilak.

== Teams ==
As a UCI World Tour event, the organisation was obliged to invite all seventeen UCI WorldTeams, and likewise, all seventeen teams were obligated to send a squad. To complete the field, two UCI Professional Continental teams were invited to join the race. The number of riders allowed per team was eight, so the starting field contained 152 cyclists.

UCI World Tour Teams

- AG2R La Mondiale
- Astana
- BMC Racing Team
- Etixx–Quick-Step
- FDJ
- IAM Cycling
- Lampre–Merida
- Lotto–Soudal
- Movistar Team
- Orica–GreenEDGE
- Cannondale–Garmin
- Team Giant–Alpecin
- Team Katusha
- LottoNL–Jumbo
- Team Sky
- Tinkoff–Saxo
- Trek Factory Racing

UCI Professional Continental teams

- CCC–Sprandi–Polkowice
- Wanty–Groupe Gobert

== Pre-race favourites ==
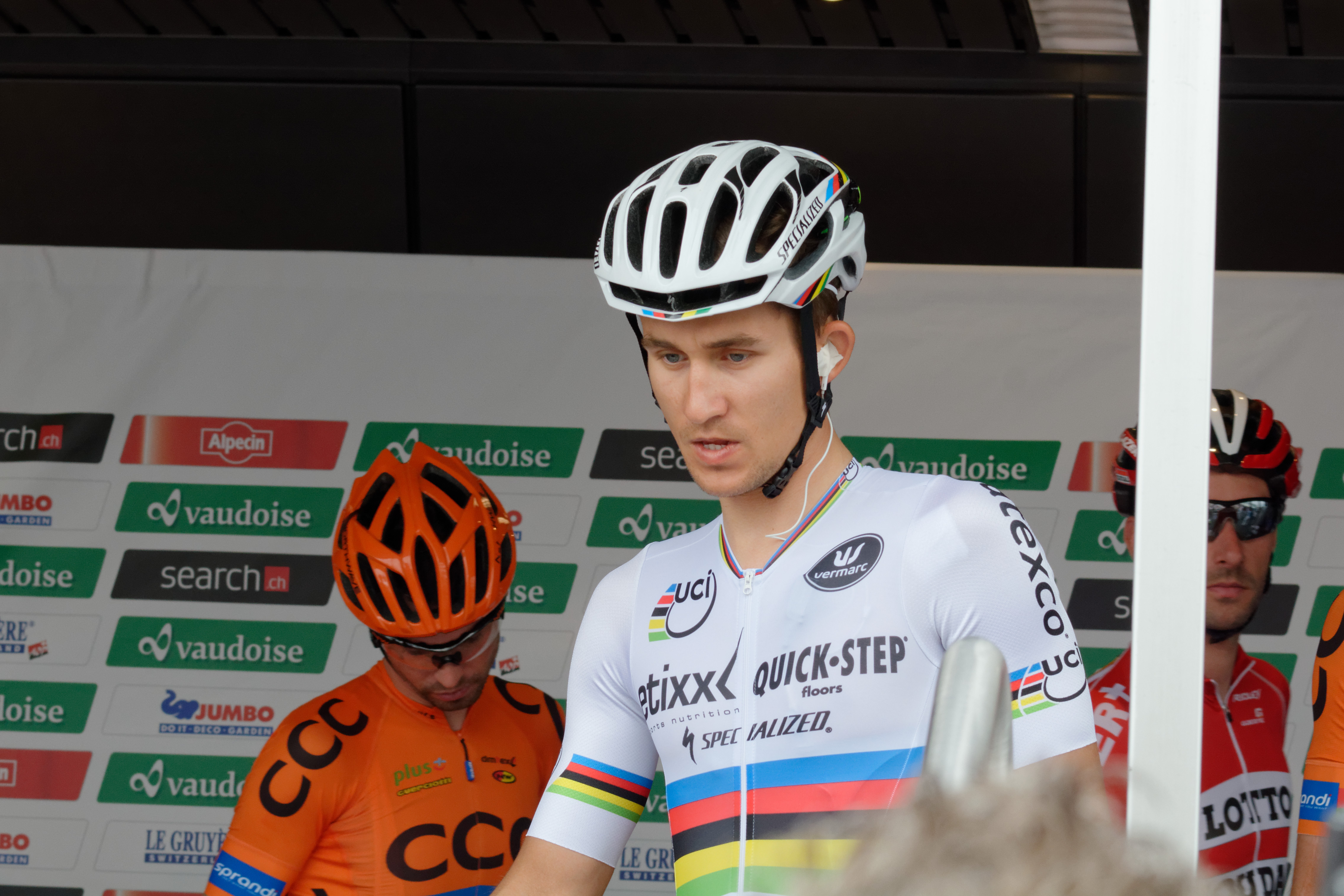
World road race champion Michał Kwiatkowski, pictured before stage two, was considered to be among the pre-race favourites for the general classification.

Rui Costa (Movistar Team) won the last three editions of the race, however he was not present at the 2015 event, as he raced in the Critérium du Dauphiné instead. More contenders for the overall classification of the Tour de France opted for the latter race since it was more mountainous. There were two former winners of the Tour de Suisse at the starting line, Trek Factory Racing teammates: Swiss Fabian Cancellara and Luxembourger Fränk Schleck.

Contenders for the general classification were Simon Špilak (Team Katusha), Thibaut Pinot (FDJ), Rafał Majka (Tinkoff–Saxo), Sergio Henao (Team Sky), Tom Dumoulin (Team Giant–Alpecin), Michał Kwiatkowski (Etixx–Quick-Step) and Geraint Thomas (Team Sky). Other hopefuls were Jurgen Van den Broeck (Lotto–Soudal) and Sébastien Reichenbach (IAM Cycling). It was AG2R La Mondiale's Domenico Pozzovivo's first race after his disastrous crash in the Giro d'Italia, so his form was predicted as uncertain, but the Italian climber could certainly be a factor if he was in shape.

Peter Sagan (Tinkoff–Saxo) was a contender for stage wins. His directeur sportif (team manager) said he was the leader of the team and would target the opening prologue. Mark Cavendish of Etixx–Quick-Step, who proved his form with twelve stage victories so far in the season, was a favourite for the sprint stages. Other riders contending stage glory were Alexander Kristoff (Team Katusha) and John Degenkolb (Team Giant–Alpecin). Cancellara, the 2009 winner, was recovering from a crash suffered at the E3 Harelbeke one-day race; his primary focus was on his recovery.

== Route ==
An important race in its own right, the 2015 Tour de Suisse was used by some Tour de France riders to perfect their physical conditions, as the well-known French race started on 4 July. The route for the race was announced on 9 March 2015.

The race did not follow any particular pattern in terms of geographical displacement around the country, but did visit Liechtenstein and Austria on the fifth stage. It was also the longest of the race and was qualified as the queen stage. It finished near Sölden situated in Austrian territory and featured a mountaintop finish. After that, the race came back in Swiss territory for the remainder of the event. The stages which were likely to be the most important for the general classification were stage five and the individual time trial on the final stage. The race featured a total elevation gain of 15,606 metres (51,200.8 feet).

On 4 June 2015, it was announced that the town of Brunnen was desisting itself from being the start of stage three because of road damage caused by a rocky landslide, and that the town of Quinto would instead be the starting town. This shortened the stage by 57.2 kilometres (35.5 miles).

Stage characteristics and winners
Stage	Date	Route	Distance	Type	Winner
1	13 June	Risch-Rotkreuz to Risch-Rotkreuz	5.1 km (3.2 mi)	Individual time trial	Tom Dumoulin (NED)
2	14 June	Risch-Rotkreuz to Risch-Rotkreuz	161.1 km (100.1 mi)	Medium-mountain stage	Kristijan Đurasek (CRO)
3	15 June	Quinto to Olivone (Note: The stage was due to be held over a distance of 174.5 kilometres (108.4 miles) and was due to start in Brunnen, but a landslide resulted in the start being moved to Quinto.)	117.3 km (72.9 mi)	Mountain stage	Peter Sagan (SVK)
4	16 June	Flims to Schwarzenbach	193.2 km (120.0 mi)	Medium-mountain stage	Michael Matthews (AUS)
5	17 June	Unterterzen to Sölden (Austria)	237.3 km (147.5 mi)	Mountain stage	Thibaut Pinot (FRA)
6	18 June	Wil to Biel/Bienne	193.1 km (120.0 mi)	Flat stage	Peter Sagan (SVK)
7	19 June	Biel/Bienne to Düdingen	164.6 km (102.3 mi)	Flat stage	Alexander Kristoff (NOR)
8	20 June	Bern to Bern	152.5 km (94.8 mi)	Medium-mountain stage	Alexey Lutsenko (KAZ)
9	21 June	Bern to Bern	38.4 km (23.9 mi)	Individual time trial	Tom Dumoulin (NED)
	Total		1,262.6 km (785 mi) (Note: The race was initially scheduled to be held over 1,319.8 kilometres (820.1 miles), but was altered due to the shortening of the third stage.)		

== Stages ==
=== Stage 1 ===
13 June 2015 — Risch-Rotkreuz to Risch-Rotkreuz, 5.1 km (3.2 mi), individual time trial (ITT)

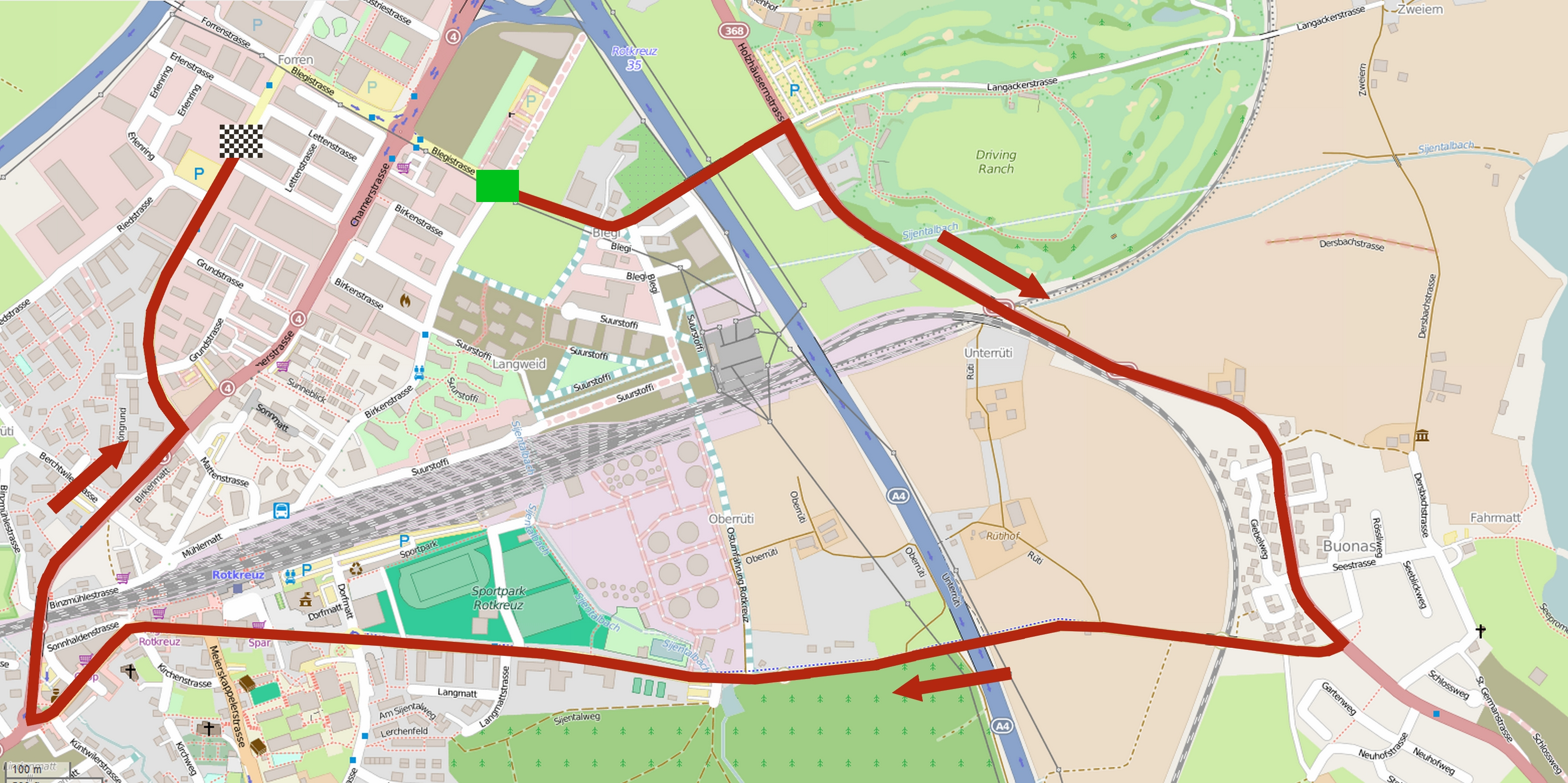
The opening prologue's 5.1-kilometre (3.2-mile) course was in and around Risch-Rotkreuz.

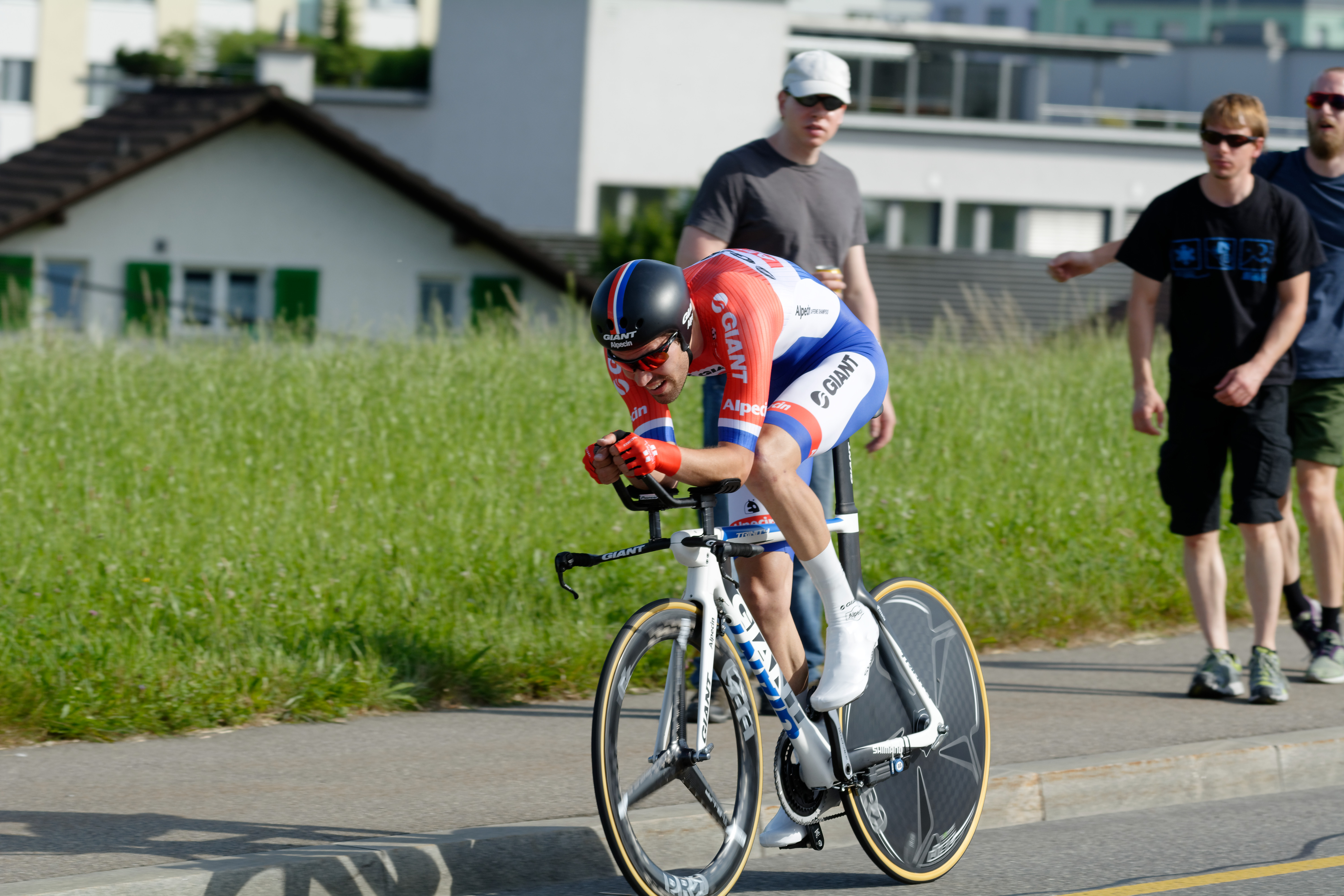
Tom Dumoulin on his way to victory on Stage 1

The very short prologue contained three sharp corners. The first two kilometers were slightly uphill, the third one was slightly downhill and the rest was flat.

The best times coming from the first tier of riders were Matthias Brändle (IAM Cycling) with 5' 45", Greg Van Avermaet (BMC Racing Team) a second slower and Cameron Meyer (Orica–GreenEDGE) another second in arrears. Thibaut Pinot (FDJ) came in with a deficit of twelve seconds on Brändle. Michael Matthews (Orica–GreenEDGE) also realised a good time, four seconds down on the provisional leader. Domenico Pozzovivo (AG2R La Mondiale) came to the finish with a fifteen-second deficit. Daniele Bennati (Tinkoff–Saxo) had the best intermediate time all day, which was calculated with 2.1 kilometres (1.3 miles) remaining as the riders went through the checkpoint.

Fabian Cancellara (Trek Factory Racing), beat Brändle with a time of 5' 43". Time trialist Adriano Malori (Movistar Team) started soon after Cancellara crossed the finish line, but came in at 5' 47", four seconds slower. Team Giant–Alpecin rider Tom Dumoulin clocked 5' 41", 2 seconds better than Cancellara, and would ultimately be the winner of the stage.

BMC Racing Team's Silvan Dillier crashed as he was on a straight stretch of road. He managed to remount and finish the stage; his final position was last place, 1' 22" down. Team Sky's leader Geraint Thomas put in a fast ride, only seven seconds down on the winner. Peter Sagan (Tinkoff–Saxo) came in five seconds in arrears of Dumoulin, missing out on his objective of being the first leader of the race. Robert Gesink (LottoNL–Jumbo) clocked a time 22 seconds slower than Dumoulin, and so did Sergio Henao of Team Sky. Poles Rafał Majka (Tinkoff–Saxo) and Michał Kwiatkowski (Etixx–Quick-Step) were 20 and 21 seconds down respectively.

After the event, Dumoulin said that he prepared at altitude for the race and that he produced a hard physical effort on the uphill section and went less intensely on the flatter parts.

Stage 1 result and general classification after stage 1
Rank	Rider	Team	Time
1	Tom Dumoulin (NED)	Team Giant–Alpecin	5' 41"
2	Fabian Cancellara (SWI)	Trek Factory Racing	+ 2"
3	Matthias Brändle (AUT)	IAM Cycling	+ 4"
4	Peter Sagan (SVK)	Tinkoff–Saxo	+ 5"
5	Steve Morabito (SWI)	FDJ	+ 5"
6	Greg Van Avermaet (BEL)	BMC Racing Team	+ 5"
7	Cameron Meyer (AUS)	Orica–GreenEDGE	+ 6"
8	Ion Izagirre (SPA)	Movistar Team	+ 6"
9	Adriano Malori (ITA)	Movistar Team	+ 6"
10	Geraint Thomas (GBR)	Team Sky	+ 7"

=== Stage 2 ===
14 June 2015 — Risch-Rotkreuz to Risch-Rotkreuz, 161.1 km (100.1 mi)

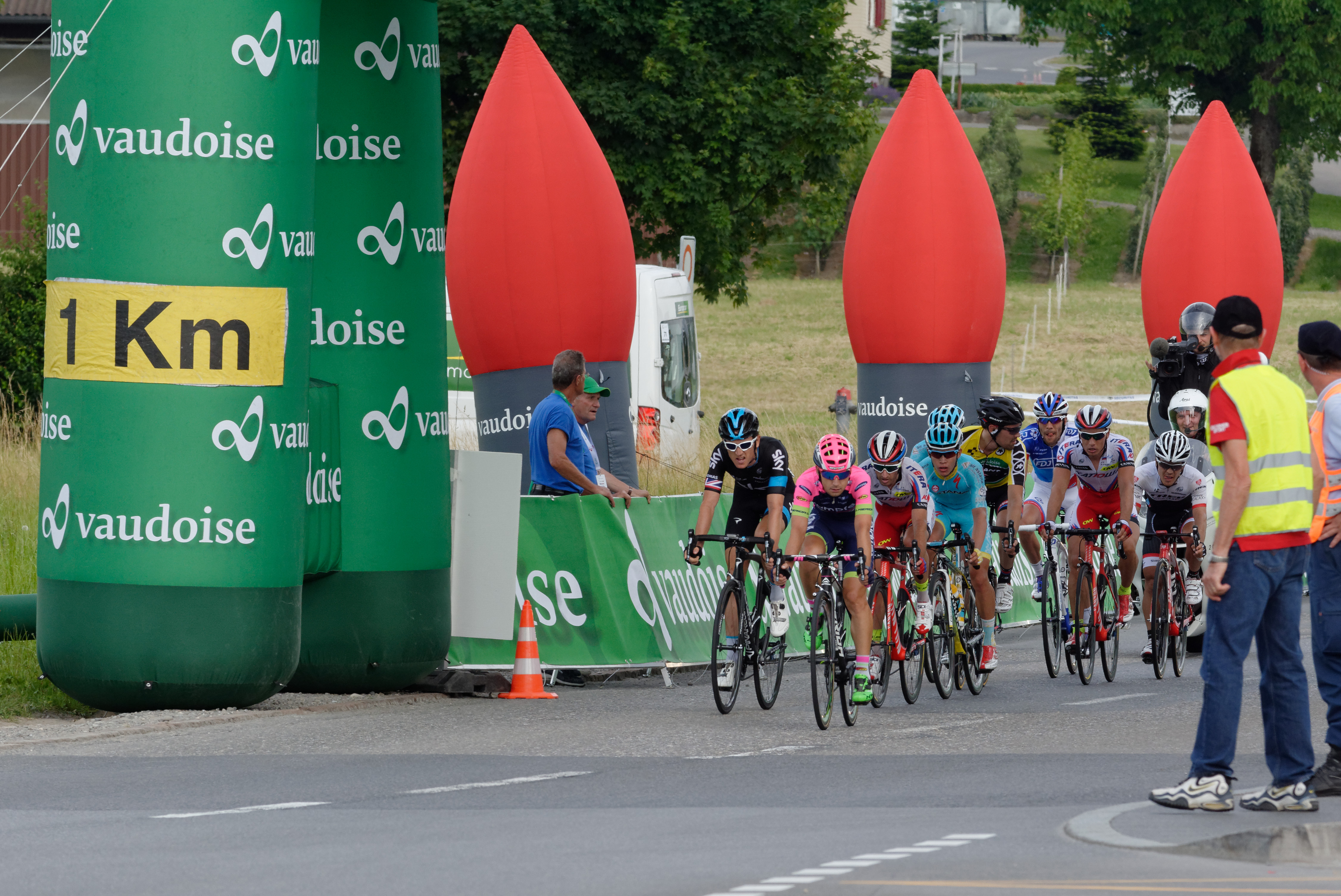
The race leaders pass beneath the archway marking 1 kilometre (0.62 miles) to go (flamme rouge).

The stage started right away with a Category 2 climb named Dorfstrasse which was 5.4 kilometres (3.4 miles) long. The riders then rode a loop to tackle the latter climb once more about midway through the stage. Afterward another loop around Risch-Rotkreuz was effectuated to reach a Category 1 affair named Michaelskreuz, 4 kilometres (2.5 miles) long. The course came back down and effectuated another circuit to tackle the climb a second and last time. This last King of the Mountains (KOM) checkpoint was situated at 12 kilometres (7.5 miles) from the finish. The riders negotiated the descent and ended up once again in Risch-Rotkreuz for the finale.

After 38 kilometres (23.6 miles) of racing, Luka Pibernik (Lampre–Merida), Cameron Meyer (Orica–GreenEDGE), Jürgen Roelandts (Lotto–Soudal) and Valerio Agnoli of Astana had an advantage of 1' 08" over chasers Ben King (Cannondale–Garmin) and Simone Antonini of Pro Continental team Wanty–Groupe Gobert. They also enjoyed a lead of 2' 55" on the peloton. The two chasers soon fell back into the main field. The maximum gap the peloton allowed the escapees to have was 3' 20". As the main group attacked the climb of Michaelskreuz for the first time, Arnaud Démare (FDJ) crashed because of the fight for position.

With 16 kilometres (9.9 miles) to go, the riders attacked the climb of Michaelskreuz for the second and last time and caught the remnants of the breakaway on the way up. Astana's Jakob Fuglsang accelerated close to the summit, with only Geraint Thomas (Team Sky) and Simon Špilak (Team Katusha) initially able to follow, while Michał Kwiatkowski (Etixx–Quick-Step) lost contact. Thomas then attacked on the descent and was followed by Fuglsang and Špilak. Tom Dumoulin (Team Giant–Alpecin) chased them as he wanted to protect his leader's jersey. A small group of nine riders formed on the descent.

Close to the final kilometre, Kristijan Đurasek of Lampre–Merida placed an acceleration and continued to a solo victory on the flat run-in. The group came in four seconds in arrears, with Daniel Moreno (Team Katusha) winning the sprint for second place before Julián Arredondo (Trek Factory Racing. Overall contenders Thibaut Pinot (FDJ) and Špilak were also part of that clique, coming in fourth and sixth respectively. Peter Sagan (Tinkoff–Saxo) won the sprint of the following group, coming in tenth at fourteen seconds. Dumoulin kept his leader's jersey, while Pibernik amassed enough mountain points (18) to earn the mountains classification jersey.

Stage 2 result
Rank	Rider	Team	Time
1	Kristijan Đurasek (CRO)	Lampre–Merida	3h 36' 52"
2	Daniel Moreno (SPA)	Team Katusha	+ 4"
3	Julián Arredondo (COL)	Trek Factory Racing	+ 4"
4	Thibaut Pinot (FRA)	FDJ	+ 4"
5	Geraint Thomas (GBR)	Team Sky	+ 4"
6	Simon Špilak (SLO)	Team Katusha	+ 4"
7	Miguel Ángel López (COL)	Astana	+ 4"
8	Jakob Fuglsang (DEN)	Astana	+ 4"
9	Tom Dumoulin (NED)	Team Giant–Alpecin	+ 4"
10	Peter Sagan (SVK)	Tinkoff–Saxo	+ 14"

General classification after stage 2
Rank	Rider	Team	Time
1	Tom Dumoulin (NED)	Team Giant–Alpecin	3h 42' 37"
2	Geraint Thomas (GBR)	Team Sky	+ 7"
3	Daniel Moreno (SPA)	Team Katusha	+ 11"
4	Jakob Fuglsang (DEN)	Astana	+ 14"
5	Peter Sagan (SVK)	Tinkoff–Saxo	+ 15"
6	Steve Morabito (SWI)	FDJ	+ 15"
7	Thibaut Pinot (FRA)	FDJ	+ 16"
8	Kristijan Đurasek (CRO)	Lampre–Merida	+ 18"
9	Bob Jungels (LUX)	Trek Factory Racing	+ 19"
10	Simon Špilak (SLO)	Team Katusha	+ 19"

=== Stage 3 ===
15 June 2015 — Quinto to Olivone, 117.3 km (72.9 mi)

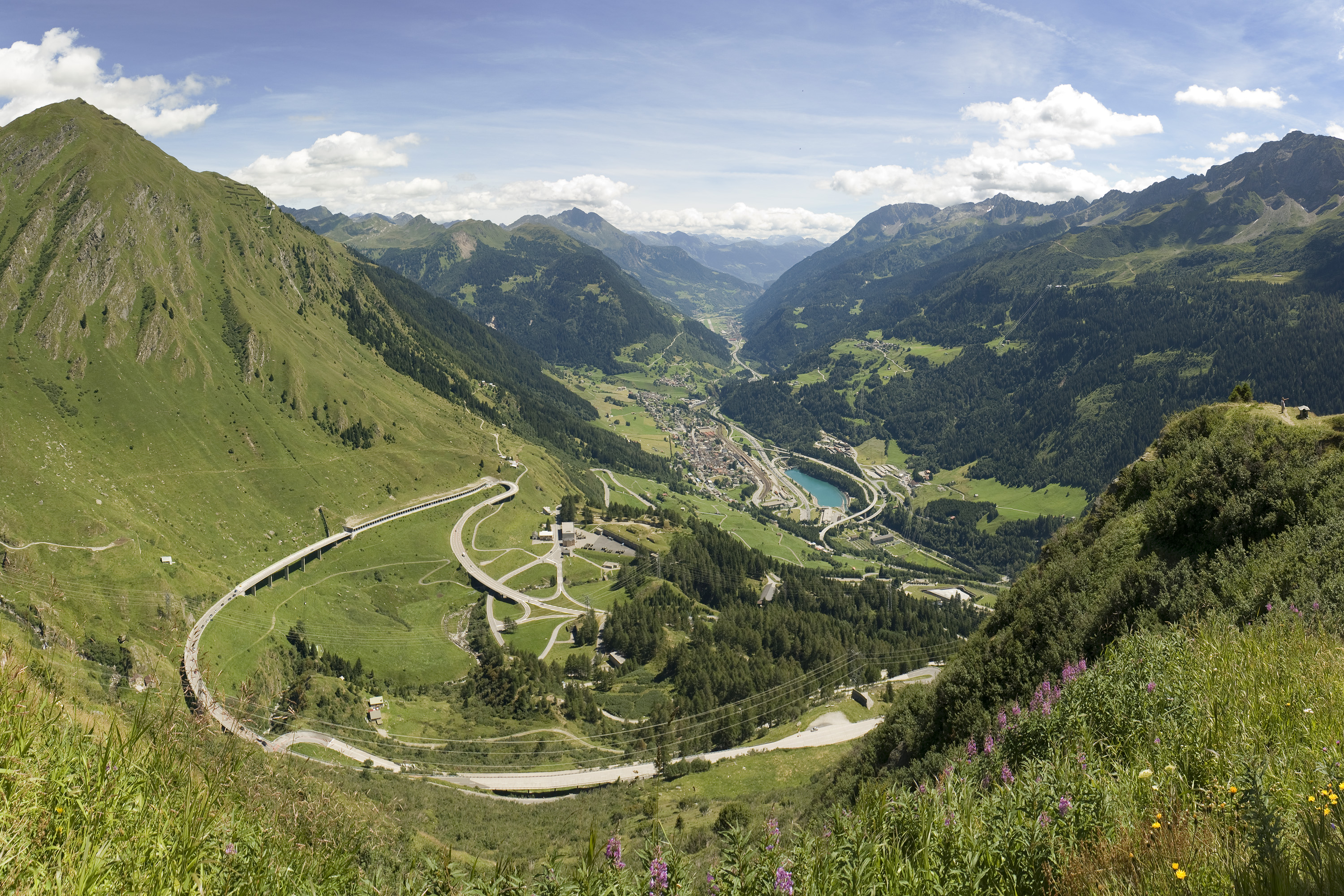
The third stage began with the hors catégorie Gotthard Pass climb.

This was the new version of the stage as the original route was closed due to a landslide. The stage immediately started with the 1,087-metre (3,566.3-foot) ascent of the hors catégorie Gotthard Pass, the summit of which was 18.8 kilometres (11.7 miles) in. Then came a long false flat until a Category 2 climb, the 5-kilometre (3.1-mile) Zona Cumiasca. It was immediately followed by a Category 3 named ascent Via Cantonale, a 3.2-kilometre (2.0-mile) climb which summited 6 kilometres (3.7 miles) from the finish.

The race got on its way under cloudy but dry conditions. The Tour de Suisse was featuring the Gotthard Pass for the 34th time in its history, and a break formed along its early slopes, which featured cobbles. The two attackers were Stefan Denifl (IAM Cycling) and Marco Marcato (Wanty–Groupe Gobert). The pair had a lead of 2' 30" on the main field as Branislau Samoilau (CCC–Sprandi–Polkowice) was chasing them. Denifl got to the top of the climb first to rake in twenty points. By the top of the pass, snow was covering the sides of the road and the field was 3' 20" back. The riders put gilets on before the descent, which lasted almost 40 kilometres (24.9 miles). Samoilau succeeded in joining the escape during the downhill.

The competitors replenished their food stock at the feed zone situated shortly after the downhill section. The main field started accelerating, with the team of the leader Tom Dumoulin, Team Giant–Alpecin doing most of the work at the front. Realising this breakaway was gaining ground, Tinkoff came to the fore to help, resulting in the gap going down gradually. There was 30 kilometres (18.6 miles) to cover as the gap was hovering around 4' 30".

At the foot of the Zona Cumiasca climb, with 19 kilometres (11.8 miles) remaining, the gap had shrunk significantly. The peloton formed sprint trains to better position their leaders for the ascent. Marcato was soon dropped from the breakaway and Denifl won the mountain points. At that point, Denifl and Samoilau had only a thirty-second gap over the depleting field. The catch was effectuated with 8.7 kilometres (5.4 miles) to race. Michael Albasini (Orica–GreenEDGE) attacked, soon followed by Jan Bakelants (AG2R La Mondiale). With the two escapees enjoying only a ten-second advantage, Sergio Henao (Team Sky) accelerated and passed them. The trio was ultimately reeled in. Rafał Majka (Tinkoff–Saxo) was working at the front of the small leading group to bring back the attackers to give his team leader Peter Sagan a chance at victory. In the last few kilometres, Sagan took over from Majka himself. He followed Daniel Moreno (Team Katusha), who had chased down Esteban Chaves (Orica–GreenEDGE), passing him to take victory.

Stage 3 result
Rank	Rider	Team	Time
1	Peter Sagan (SVK)	Tinkoff–Saxo	3h 00' 35"
2	Daniel Moreno (SPA)	Team Katusha	+ 0"
3	Thibaut Pinot (FRA)	FDJ	+ 0"
4	Julián Arredondo (COL)	Trek Factory Racing	+ 0"
5	Tom Dumoulin (NED)	Team Giant–Alpecin	+ 0"
6	Geraint Thomas (GBR)	Team Sky	+ 0"
7	Jakob Fuglsang (DEN)	Astana	+ 0"
8	Esteban Chaves (COL)	Orica–GreenEDGE	+ 0"
9	Sergio Henao (COL)	Team Sky	+ 0"
10	José Joaquín Rojas (SPA)	Movistar Team	+ 0"

General classification after stage 3
Rank	Rider	Team	Time
1	Tom Dumoulin (NED)	Team Giant–Alpecin	6h 43' 12"
2	Daniel Moreno (SPA)	Team Katusha	+ 5"
3	Peter Sagan (SVK)	Tinkoff–Saxo	+ 5"
4	Geraint Thomas (GBR)	Team Sky	+ 7"
5	Thibaut Pinot (FRA)	FDJ	+ 12"
6	Jakob Fuglsang (DEN)	Astana	+ 14"
7	Steve Morabito (SWI)	FDJ	+ 15"
8	Kristijan Đurasek (CRO)	Lampre–Merida	+ 18"
9	Bob Jungels (LUX)	Trek Factory Racing	+ 19"
10	Simon Špilak (SLO)	Team Katusha	+ 19"

=== Stage 4 ===
16 June 2015 — Flims to Schwarzenbach, 193.2 km (120.0 mi)

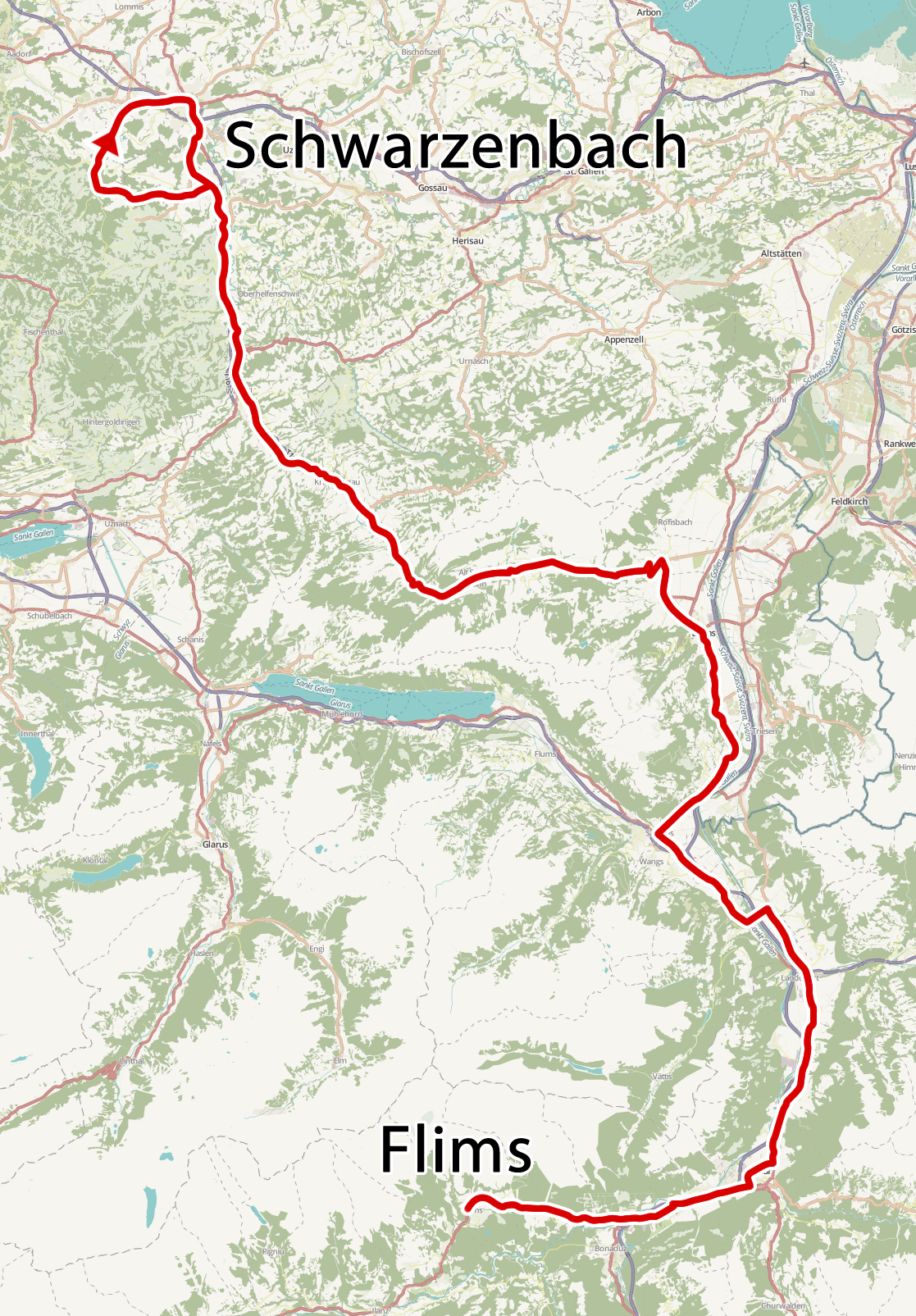
The 193.2-kilometre (120.0-mile) route of stage four began in Flims and finished in Schwarzenbach.

The first 60 kilometres (37.3 miles) were flat until the peloton reached the Wildhaus Pass, a Category 2 test of 8.9 kilometres (5.5 miles) in length. Then there were three Category 3 climbs on offer, which were the 1.8-kilometre (1.1-mile) Kirchberg climb repeated three times as the riders accomplished a loop. There were however a number of uncategorized rises, especially one with about 5 kilometres (3.1 miles) to cover, that was expected to play a role in the outcome. The finishing 900 metres (2,952.8 feet) were straight with a consistent incline.

Davide Malacarne (Astana) and Thomas De Gendt (Lotto–Soudal) attacked early in the stage. They were joined by a trio of Stijn Devolder (Trek Factory Racing), Alex Howes (Cannondale–Garmin) and Frederik Backaert (Wanty–Groupe Gobert). De Gendt crested the Wildhaus Pass first to take eight points in the mountains competition. At the summit, after 66 kilometres (41.0 miles) of racing, the gap between the peloton and the breakers was two minutes and fifty seconds.

De Gendt took maximum points atop the Kirchberg climb on the riders' first passage. The main field got through the same point 2' 05" in arrears. The descent was fast and the riders crossed the finish line for the first time of three with about 60 kilometres (37.3 miles) to race. The breakaway was caught less than 10 kilometres (6.2 miles) later. Orica–GreenEDGE marshaled the field as De Gendt attacked again to no avail as he was swiftly swept back. Sprint specialists Arnaud Démare (FDJ), Mark Cavendish (Etixx–Quick-Step) and Alexander Kristoff (Team Katusha) struggled with the high pace at the front set by Orica–GreenEDGE. As the peloton crossed the line for the last time with 29.2 kilometres (18.1 miles) to race, there were no escapees.

The last mountains points of the day atop the Kirchberg climb was won by Daryl Impey; it was uncontested and he won because he was riding at the front. Alexey Lutsenko (Astana) placed an attack with 16 kilometres (9.9 miles) to go. With 10 kilometres (6.2 miles) to race he had opened up an advantage of 20 seconds. With 6.7 kilometres (4.2 miles) remaining, Lutsenko was caught. An attack formed immediately including the riders Marco Marcato (Wanty–Groupe Gobert), Jan Bakelants (AG2R La Mondiale) and Sergio Henao (Team Sky); it failed and they were brought back as Tinkoff–Saxo and Orica–GreenEDGE teams worked together to set up a sprint finish. With 300 metres (984.3 feet) to go, Sagan initiated his sprint first and was followed by Michael Matthews of Orica–GreenEDGE. Matthews then passed him to claim his first victory at the Tour de Suisse. Sagan took second place and the points classification jersey.

Stage 4 result
Rank	Rider	Team	Time
1	Michael Matthews (AUS)	Orica–GreenEDGE	4h 36' 00"
2	Peter Sagan (SVK)	Tinkoff–Saxo	+ 0"
3	Greg Van Avermaet (BEL)	BMC Racing Team	+ 0"
4	John Degenkolb (GER)	Team Giant–Alpecin	+ 0"
5	Jasper Stuyven (BEL)	Trek Factory Racing	+ 0"
6	Daniel Moreno (ESP)	Team Katusha	+ 0"
7	Silvan Dillier (SUI)	BMC Racing Team	+ 0"
8	Thibaut Pinot (FRA)	FDJ	+ 0"
9	Matteo Trentin (ITA)	Etixx–Quick-Step	+ 0"
10	Robert Gesink (NED)	LottoNL–Jumbo	+ 0"

General classification after stage 4
Rank	Rider	Team	Time
1	Tom Dumoulin (NED)	Team Giant–Alpecin	11h 19' 09"
2	Peter Sagan (SVK)	Tinkoff–Saxo	+ 0"
3	Daniel Moreno (SPA)	Team Katusha	+ 8"
4	Geraint Thomas (GBR)	Team Sky	+ 9"
5	Thibaut Pinot (FRA)	FDJ	+ 15"
6	Jakob Fuglsang (DEN)	Astana	+ 17"
7	Steve Morabito (SWI)	FDJ	+ 18"
8	Kristijan Đurasek (CRO)	Lampre–Merida	+ 21"
9	Bob Jungels (LUX)	Trek Factory Racing	+ 22"
10	Simon Špilak (SLO)	Team Katusha	+ 22"

=== Stage 5 ===
17 June 2015 — Unterterzen to Sölden (Austria), 237.3 km (147.5 mi)

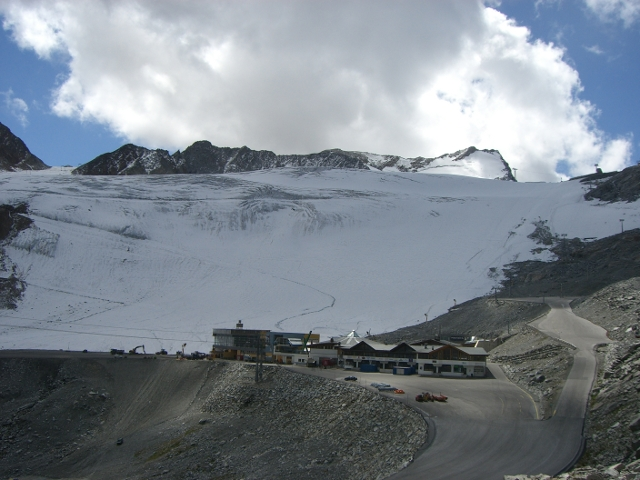
After more than 200 kilometres (124.3 miles) of racing, the climb to the Rettenbach glacier awaited.

This was the queen stage of the 2015 Tour de Suisse and was also the longest stage the race featured in the last twenty years. The first difficulty of the day was the 34.4-kilometre (21.4-mile) hors catégorie Bielerhöhe Pass which summited at 2,071 metres (6,794.6 feet) of altitude and at that point, the riders were already in Austria after a brief visit to Liechtenstein. Following that difficulty, the run-in to Sölden offered a respite until the cyclists reached the town and tackled the stage's second hors catégorie climb to the Rettenbach glacier, which took them to an altitude of 2,669 metres (8,756.6 feet). The competitors rode the Ötztal Glacier Road from Sölden to get to the finish line.

The overall race leader Tom Dumoulin (Team Giant–Alpecin) said before the stage that if he lost less than one minute and a half to the pure climbers, he could still win the Tour by taking that time back on the final stage's time trial. The previous stage's victor Michael Matthews (Orica–GreenEDGE) was a non-starter, saying he had gotten what he wanted from the race: a stage win. A breakaway formed in the opening 10 kilometres (6.2 miles) of the race. They were Grégory Rast (Trek Factory Racing), mountains jersey wearer Stefan Denifl and his teammate Matthias Brändle (IAM Cycling), Ben King (Cannondale–Garmin), Przemysław Niemiec (Lampre–Merida), Stefan Schumacher (CCC–Sprandi–Polkowice), Thomas De Gendt (Lotto–Soudal) and Mirko Selvaggi (Wanty–Groupe Gobert). The best-placed cyclist in the break on the general classification was Selvaggi in 59th place, 18' 38" down on Dumoulin. Denifl amassed maximum points atop the Bielerhöhe Pass, comforting his lead in the mountains classification. Ion Izagirre of the Movistar Team abandoned after the pass.

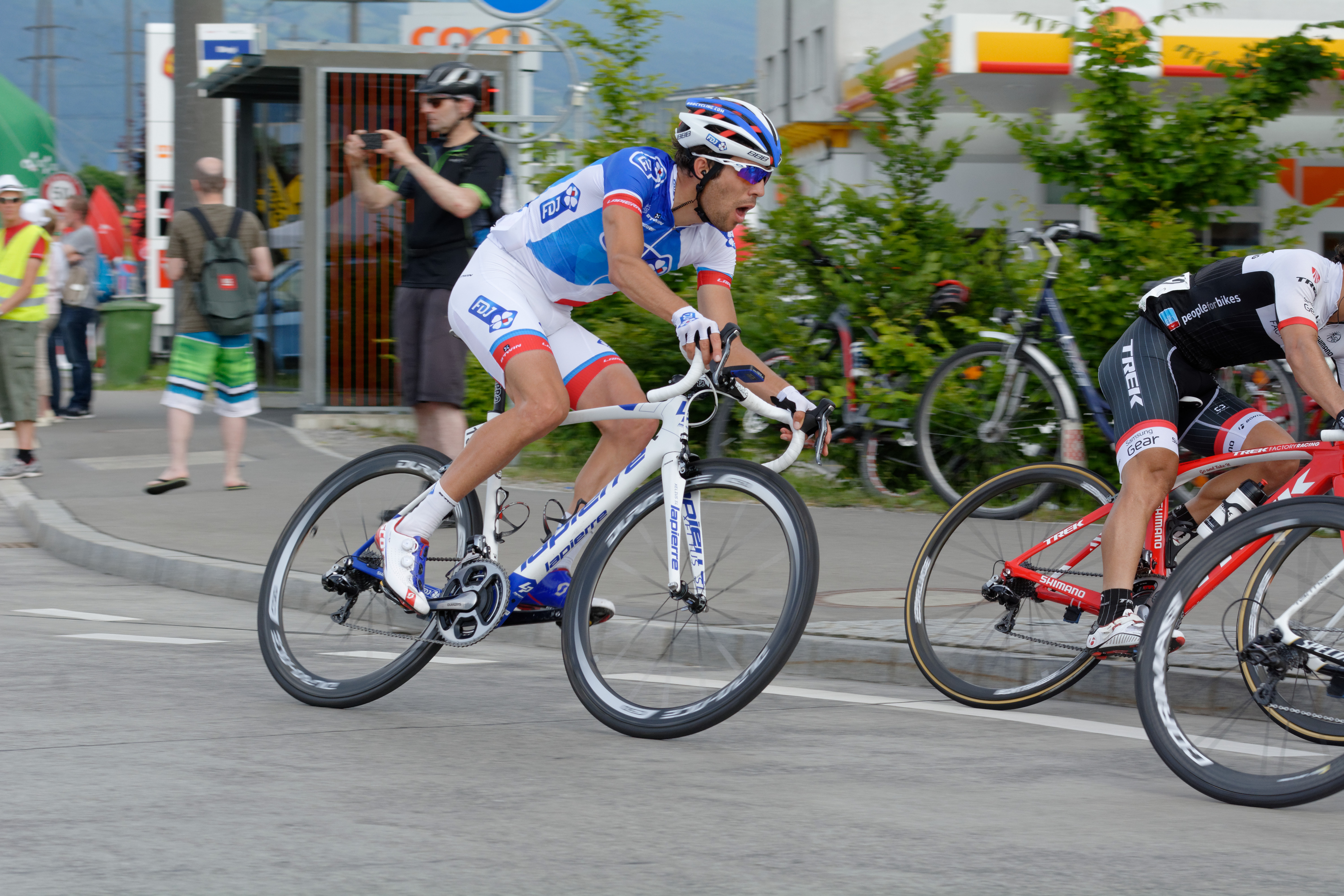
Thibaut Pinot, seen here riding stage two, won the queen stage of the race and took the lead of the race.

With 90 kilometres (55.9 miles) to go the gap was miscalculated by the race organisers as there were unrealistic fluctuations in the official timing throughout the long stretch of flat road before the final climb. With 82 kilometres (51.0 miles) to cover, Astana took control of the peloton for their leader Jakob Fuglsang. FDJ and Team Katusha started helping the chase at the front, since those teams had riders aiming for victory (Thibaut Pinot and the Daniel Moreno–Simon Špilak duo, respectively). With 30 kilometres (18.6 miles) to the start of the big final climb, the gap was around six and a half minutes. The break fractured, just as the peloton did later when they hit the Rettenbach ascent. Dumoulin was dropped almost at the beginning of it but resisted, climbing at his own pace. Špilak attacked with 8 kilometres (5.0 miles) remaining and dangled in front of a select group.

Early breaker Denifl was alone in front and had about two minutes of an advantage with 4 kilometres (2.5 miles) to go. Behind, Domenico Pozzovivo placed an acceleration that put the lead group in difficulty, but he was brought back. The time gap rapidly decreased, due to dubious time monitoring again. Pinot launched an attack from the group, but Špilak had the resources to keep up with him for a while but was ultimately dropped. Pinot passed the passive Denifl before the arch signaling the last kilometre (flamme rouge) and took a solo victory. Pozzovivo finished second while Špilak settled for third. However, it became soon apparent that Dumoulin would not lose much more than the minute and a half that was his objective. He passed the line 1' 37" down on Pinot. "I'm very happy, it was important for me and the team. We came here to win a stage, and I had good legs today. I've got a lot of confidence now, that's important for the Tour de France. And it's true, racing in Switzerland seems to suit me", said Pinot. "The objective is to win overall here, but the rouleurs like [Geraint] Thomas and [Tom] Dumoulin aren't far back", he added. "It'll be a long and difficult time trial [on stage nine]. We'll see what happens on the day."

Stage 5 result
Rank	Rider	Team	Time
1	Thibaut Pinot (FRA)	FDJ	6h 22' 47"
2	Domenico Pozzovivo (ITA)	AG2R La Mondiale	+ 34"
3	Simon Špilak (SLO)	Team Katusha	+ 37"
4	Miguel Ángel López (COL)	Astana	+ 43"
5	Geraint Thomas (GBR)	Team Sky	+ 43"
6	Jakob Fuglsang (DEN)	Astana	+ 1' 15"
7	Jan Hirt (CZE)	CCC–Sprandi–Polkowice	+ 1' 18"
8	Sergio Henao (COL)	Team Sky	+ 1' 29"
DSQ	~~Stefan Denifl~~ (AUT)	~~IAM Cycling~~	~~+ 1' 31"~~
10	Tom Dumoulin (NED)	Team Giant–Alpecin	+ 1' 37"

General classification after stage 5
Rank	Rider	Team	Time
1	Thibaut Pinot (FRA)	FDJ	17h 42' 01"
2	Geraint Thomas (GBR)	Team Sky	+ 47"
3	Simon Špilak (SLO)	Team Katusha	+ 50"
4	Domenico Pozzovivo (ITA)	AG2R La Mondiale	+ 55"
5	Miguel Ángel López (COL)	Astana	+ 1' 07"
6	Jakob Fuglsang (DEN)	Astana	+ 1' 27"
7	Tom Dumoulin (NED)	Team Giant–Alpecin	+ 1' 32"
8	Steve Morabito (SWI)	FDJ	+ 2' 29"
9	Sébastien Reichenbach (SWI)	IAM Cycling	+ 2' 43"
10	Sergio Henao (COL)	Team Sky	+ 2' 46"

=== Stage 6 ===
18 June 2015 — Wil to Biel/Bienne, 193.1 km (120.0 mi)

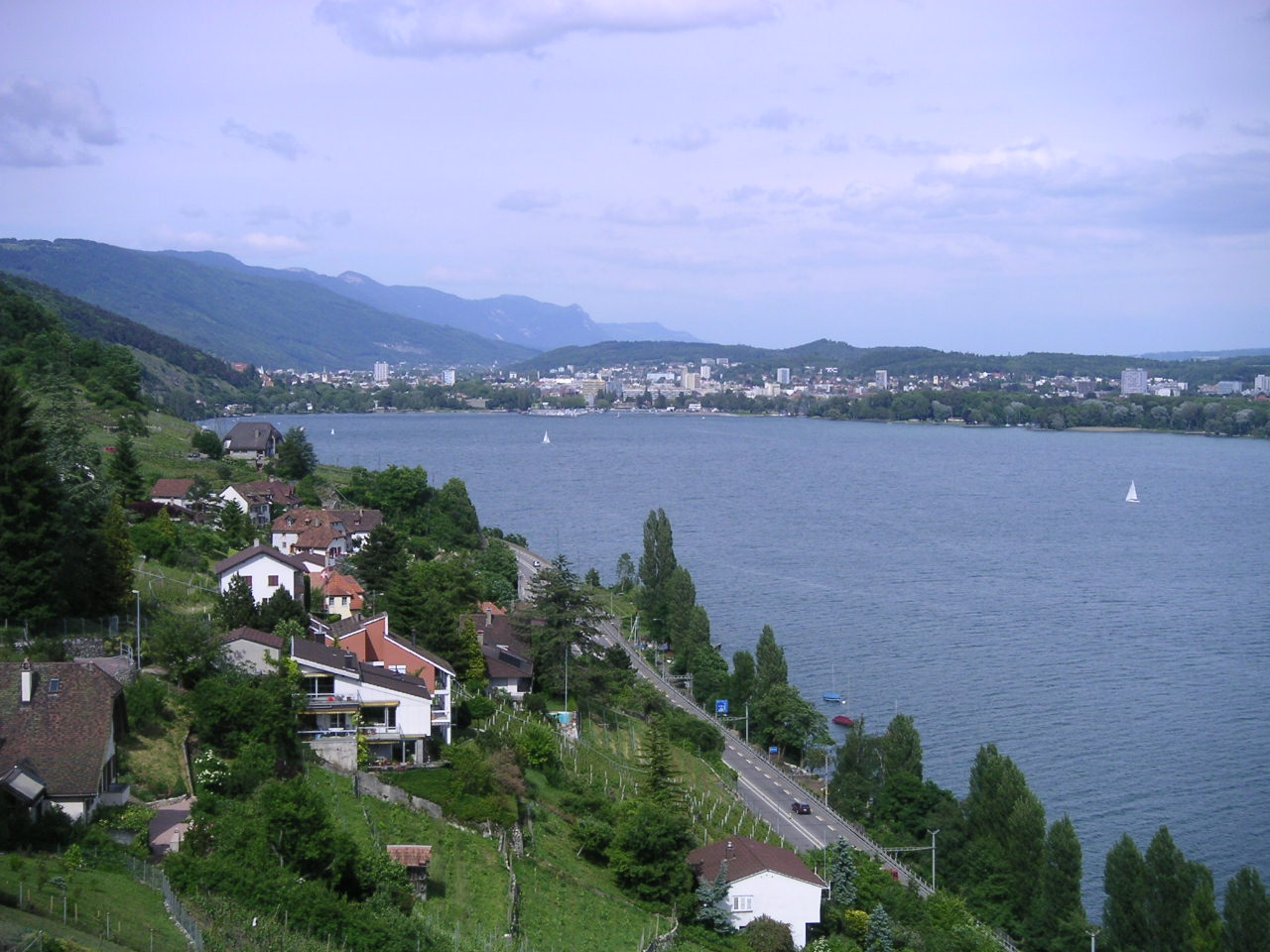
The finishing town of Biel/Bienne saw Peter Sagan take his second win at the 2015 Tour de Suisse. Pictured here is the Lake Biel close to the town.

This stage contained only one categorised ascent midway through it and was a Category 3 affair named Auensteinstrasse. However, there were numerous uncategorized rises on the course to Biel/Bienne and the total elevation gain for the stage was 1,167 metres (3,828.7 feet). Two intermediate sprints came before the run into town in the final 40 kilometres (24.9 miles).

As the stage started, there were 145 riders remaining in the race, as only seven entrants had abandoned since the start of the race. The day's breakers were Axel Domont (AG2R La Mondiale), Marek Rutkiewicz (CCC–Sprandi–Polkowice), Matej Mohorič (Cannondale–Garmin) and Jérôme Baugnies (Wanty–Groupe Gobert). The riders soon tackled the Eschenmosen, one of the many uncategorised ascents of the day. With 136 kilometres (84.5 miles) left, the breakaway's advantage stood at 4' 30". The breakers took the points on offer on the only climb of the day, Auensteinstrasse, so Stefan Denifl of IAM Cycling maintained his 30-point advantage over his nearest competitor Thomas De Gendt (Lotto–Soudal). Rutkiewicz won the maximum five points that came with cresting the ascent first. About midway through, it was calculated that the peloton's average speed was slower than the slowest prediction by the organisers, most likely due to the severity of the previous stage.

With 65 kilometres (40.4 miles) to cover, rain began to fall; the main field was led by FDJ, Etixx–Quick-Step, Team Giant–Alpecin and Team Katusha. Baugnies rode first across an uncontested intermediate sprint with 42.7 kilometres (26.5 miles) to go. 25 kilometres (15.5 miles) from the finish, Adriano Malori and Francisco Ventoso of Movistar Team surprised the peloton by attacking. At the 10 kilometres (6.2 miles) remaining arch, the break of four still held a lead of forty seconds with the two Movistar Team riders placed between the groups. Etixx–Quick-Step took matters in their own hands and began forming their sprint train for Mark Cavendish. Tinkoff–Saxo moved to the front in support of their sprint hopeful, Peter Sagan. With 5 kilometres (3.1 miles) to cover, the escape had 30 seconds of an advantage. At that point, two Etixx–Quick-Step riders (Julien Vermote and Zdeněk Štybar) crashed on the water-logged tarmac before a bend, but the mishap had no consequences on the peloton. The breakers were brought back just before the flamme rouge.

Shortly thereafter, Cavendish lost the wheel of his lead-out man Mark Renshaw after struggling to come back after the crash which hindered his lead-out train. There were two technical turns before the finish line. Sagan was sitting in third wheel of his team's train; he negotiated the final 90 degree corner with 200 metres (660 feet) to go and profited from an unintentional lead-out by Jürgen Roelandts (Lotto–Soudal), who had opened his sprint before Sagan outpowered him in the last 100 metres (330 feet) to win the day. It was Sagan's eleventh victory at the Tour de Suisse, matching the record of Hugo Koblet and Ferdinand Kübler. Due to a split in the peloton, Pinot lost five seconds to general classification rival Geraint Thomas of Team Sky.

Stage 6 result
Rank	Rider	Team	Time
1	Peter Sagan (SVK)	Tinkoff–Saxo	4h 34' 43"
2	Jürgen Roelandts (BEL)	Lotto–Soudal	+ 0"
3	Alexander Kristoff (NOR)	Team Katusha	+ 0"
4	Jempy Drucker (LUX)	BMC Racing Team	+ 0"
5	Daniele Bennati (ITA)	Tinkoff–Saxo	+ 0"
6	Mark Cavendish (GBR)	Etixx–Quick-Step	+ 2"
7	Tom Van Asbroeck (BEL)	LottoNL–Jumbo	+ 2"
8	Alexey Lutsenko (KAZ)	Astana	+ 2"
9	Borut Božič (SLO)	Astana	+ 2"
10	Jakob Fuglsang (DEN)	Astana	+ 2"

General classification after stage 6
Rank	Rider	Team	Time
1	Thibaut Pinot (FRA)	FDJ	22h 16' 51"
2	Geraint Thomas (GBR)	Team Sky	+ 42"
3	Simon Špilak (SLO)	Team Katusha	+ 50"
4	Domenico Pozzovivo (ITA)	AG2R La Mondiale	+ 55"
5	Miguel Ángel López (COL)	Astana	+ 1' 07"
6	Jakob Fuglsang (DEN)	Astana	+ 1' 22"
7	Tom Dumoulin (NED)	Team Giant–Alpecin	+ 1' 32"
8	Steve Morabito (SWI)	FDJ	+ 2' 29"
9	Sébastien Reichenbach (SWI)	IAM Cycling	+ 2' 43"
10	Sergio Henao (COL)	Team Sky	+ 2' 46"

=== Stage 7 ===
19 June 2015 — Biel/Bienne to Düdingen, 164.2 km (102.0 mi)

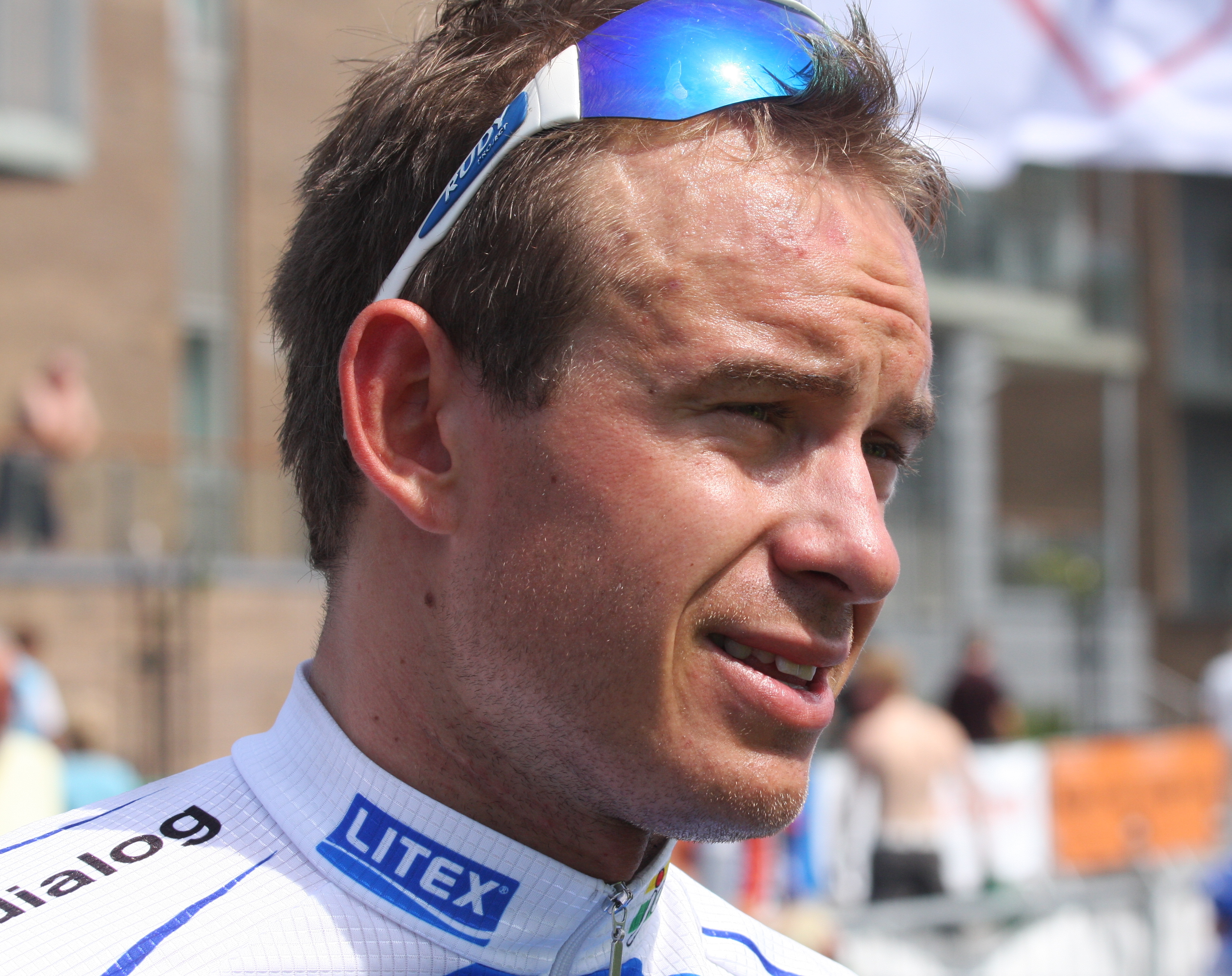
Team Katusha rider Alexander Kristoff (pictured in 2009) won stage seven's bunch sprint finish.

Stage 7 was a flat stage except for three Category 3 climbs in the second half of the stage. The opening 60 kilometres (37.3 miles) were totally flat. After 91 kilometres (56.5 miles), the riders tackled the finishing circuit twice. During that circuit, the first climb was the 1.1-kilometre (0.7-mile) Freiburgstrasse. There was a descent, then the Hauptstrasse climb was covered. During the second circuit, the Freiburgstrasse was attacked again. This last difficulty was situated 19 kilometres (11.8 miles) from the finish line. The final 800 metres (2,624.7 feet) were steep.

World road race champion Michał Kwiatkowski of the Etixx–Quick-Step squad made attempts at escaping before the peloton finally let him go 20 kilometres (12.4 miles) into the race. He was joined by Silvan Dillier (BMC Racing Team), Daryl Impey (Orica–GreenEDGE) and Axel Domont (AG2R La Mondiale). After the break was resolved, the peloton was content in letting the gap increase to 3' 15" with 129 kilometres (80.2 miles) of racing remaining. The best placed rider in this quartet was Impey, 29' 18" down on race leader Thibaut Pinot (FDJ). The average speed of the first hour was 47.7 km/h (29.6 mph). Tinkoff–Saxo and Team Giant–Alpecin dictated the pace, pulling back thirty seconds. With 88 kilometres (54.7 miles) to go, the race passed through the village of Misery-Courtion, at which point the gap stood at 2' 50". A crash occurred in the outskirts of Misery-Courtion, involving Ben Hermans and Manuel Senni (both with BMC Racing Team). They were able to remount their bikes and rejoined the main field.

Wanty–Groupe Gobert's Enrico Gasparotto abandoned two hours into the stage, which were contested at the speed of 44 km/h (27.3 mph). With 55 kilometres (34.2 miles) remaining, the escapees had a minute's lead. Domont took the maximum points atop the first climb of the day. As they crossed the line for the last time with 37 kilometres (23.0 miles) to go, the breakers were resisting as the time difference was still around a minute. On the second lap of the finishing circuit, Domont was dropped from the breakaway and was absorbed in by the peloton. The now three-rider break had a thirty-second advantage with 10 kilometres (6.2 miles) remaining. Team Katusha controlled the front of the field in the final kilometres. With 2 kilometres (1.2 miles) to go, the peloton almost pulled back the all unyielding breakers, as Kwiatkowski decided to go alone. He was caught in sight of the finish line. The uphill sprint was won by Alexander Kristoff of Team Katusha, with Peter Sagan (Tinkoff–Saxo) being a close second. Sagan got out of Kristoff's slipstream to try to out-sprint him in the final metres, but to no avail. This was Kristoff's eighteenth victory of the season. Through bad positioning, Pinot lost a further five seconds to Geraint Thomas (Team Sky) in the overall classification. "It was a hard day, I haven't felt super in this Tour de Suisse but I did a good sprint today", said the winner. "I got ahead of Sagan and I was able to go again at the end to hold off his run."

Stage 7 result
Rank	Rider	Team	Time
1	Alexander Kristoff (NOR)	Team Katusha	3h 38' 07"
2	Peter Sagan (SVK)	Tinkoff–Saxo	+ 0"
3	Davide Cimolai (ITA)	Lampre–Merida	+ 0"
4	Greg Van Avermaet (BEL)	BMC Racing Team	+ 0"
5	Arnaud Démare (FRA)	FDJ	+ 0"
6	Jürgen Roelandts (BEL)	Lotto–Soudal	+ 0"
7	Sep Vanmarcke (BEL)	LottoNL–Jumbo	+ 0"
8	Michael Albasini (SWI)	Orica–GreenEDGE	+ 0"
9	Marco Marcato (ITA)	Wanty–Groupe Gobert	+ 0"
10	José Joaquín Rojas (SPA)	Movistar Team	+ 0"

General classification after stage 7
Rank	Rider	Team	Time
1	Thibaut Pinot (FRA)	FDJ	25h 55' 03"
2	Geraint Thomas (GBR)	Team Sky	+ 37"
3	Domenico Pozzovivo (ITA)	AG2R La Mondiale	+ 50"
4	Simon Špilak (SLO)	Team Katusha	+ 50"
5	Miguel Ángel López (COL)	Astana	+ 1' 07"
6	Jakob Fuglsang (DEN)	Astana	+ 1' 22"
7	Tom Dumoulin (NED)	Team Giant–Alpecin	+ 1' 27"
8	Steve Morabito (SWI)	FDJ	+ 2' 29"
9	Sébastien Reichenbach (SWI)	IAM Cycling	+ 2' 43"
10	Sergio Henao (COL)	Team Sky	+ 2' 46"

=== Stage 8 ===
20 June 2015 — Bern to Bern, 152.5 km (94.8 mi)

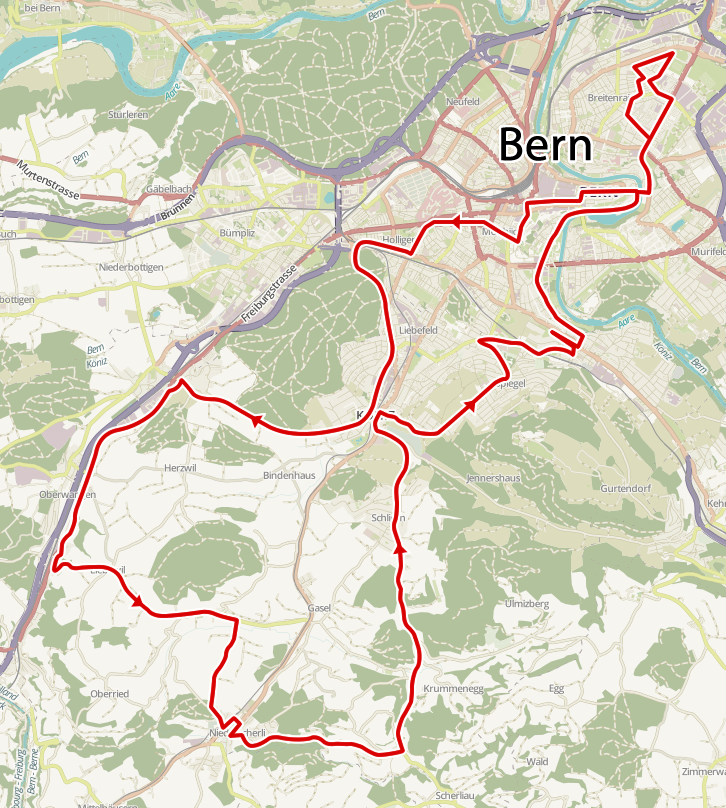
Stage eight's 38.7-kilometre (24.0-mile) circuit in and around Bern was navigated four times.

The stage was ridden in and around Bern, the first time the Tour de Suisse had been to the national capital since 2009. This was another stage which featured a lot of uncategorised rises. It however contained four Category 3 ascents. The event featured four circuits of 38.7 kilometres (24.0 miles) around town, on the same course that was to be used in the stage nine time trial. The two climbs present in the loops gave mountain points on the last two laps only. The riders first took on the 800-metre (2,624.7-foot) Category 3 Liebewill, then it was the 400-metre (1,312.3-foot) Aargauerstalden climb. The stage finished on the flat, a plateau after the latter ascent, featuring a number of technical turns.

A breakaway of twelve formed at the very start, but was deemed too dangerous and quickly reabsorbed. Citing back problems, Trek Factory Racing rider Jasper Stuyven abandoned the race. The attackers continued to try to form a break and a move by Etixx–Quick-Step's Michał Kwiatkowski finally made it. A break of nineteen riders emerged, containing among others Warren Barguil (Team Giant–Alpecin), the best placed rider of the move in the general classification at 4' 52". Team Sky, Cannondale–Garmin and FDJ led the chase. Despite the main field's effort, the gap grew to two minutes with 87 kilometres (54.1 miles) to cover.

With 75 kilometres (46.6 miles) to go in the stage, the gap stood at 2' 12". However, Team Sky, Cannondale–Garmin and FDJ were still working to keep the escapees in range. The time difference to the escape was remaining stationary at around two minutes at the 40 kilometres (24.9 miles) to go marker. As the peloton passed through the finish line to undertake the last lap of the circuit, Jakob Fuglsang of Astana abandoned the race due to stomach problems. The peloton was forming a long single line as the pace was high. Maxime Monfort (Lotto–Soudal) crashed and abandoned, with bruising on his shoulder and back.

With 20 kilometres (12.4 miles) remaining, Astana's Alexey Lutsenko attacked the escapees, followed by Jan Bakelants (AG2R La Mondiale); they opened a gap, holding off their former breakaway companions. Bakelants led for the last few kilometres except under the flamme rouge and Lutsenko outsprinted him to claim the victory. He described the win as the biggest of his career. The main field arrived in small groups, with the first one containing Team Sky's Geraint Thomas and Tom Dumoulin of Team Giant–Alpecin, who made a marginal time gain of three seconds on overall leader Thibaut Pinot.

Stage 8 result
Rank	Rider	Team	Time
1	Alexey Lutsenko (KAZ)	Astana	3h 28' 11"
2	Jan Bakelants (BEL)	AG2R La Mondiale	+ 1"
3	Warren Barguil (FRA)	Team Giant–Alpecin	+ 17"
4	Marco Haller (AUT)	Team Katusha	+ 22"
5	Daniele Bennati (ITA)	Tinkoff–Saxo	+ 22"
6	Michael Albasini (SWI)	Orica–GreenEDGE	+ 22"
7	Matteo Trentin (ITA)	Etixx–Quick-Step	+ 22"
8	Danilo Wyss (SWI)	BMC Racing Team	+ 22"
9	Winner Anacona (COL)	Movistar Team	+ 22"
10	Stijn Devolder (BEL)	Trek Factory Racing	+ 22"

General classification after stage 8
Rank	Rider	Team	Time
1	Thibaut Pinot (FRA)	FDJ	29h 25' 28"
2	Geraint Thomas (GBR)	Team Sky	+ 34"
3	Simon Špilak (SLO)	Team Katusha	+ 47"
4	Domenico Pozzovivo (ITA)	AG2R La Mondiale	+ 50"
5	Miguel Ángel López (COL)	Astana	+ 1' 14"
6	Tom Dumoulin (NED)	Team Giant–Alpecin	+ 1' 24"
7	Steve Morabito (SWI)	FDJ	+ 2' 29"
8	Sébastien Reichenbach (SWI)	IAM Cycling	+ 2' 43"
9	Sergio Henao (COL)	Team Sky	+ 2' 46"
10	Warren Barguil (FRA)	Team Giant–Alpecin	+ 2' 51"

=== Stage 9 ===
21 June 2015 — Bern to Bern, 38.4 km (23.9 mi), individual time trial (ITT)

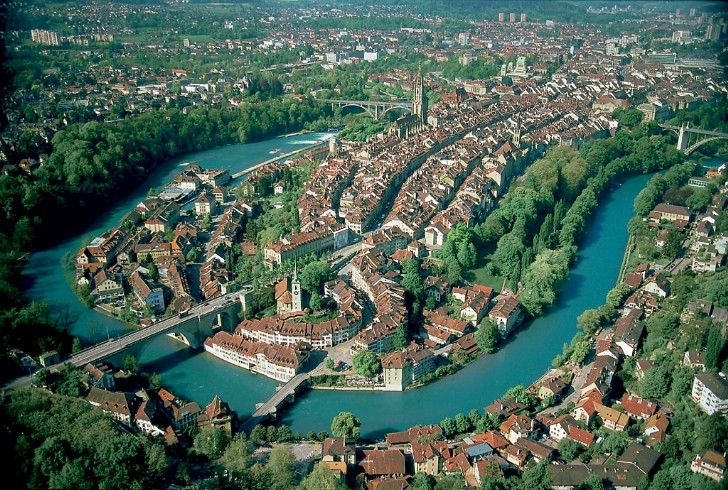
Bern hosted the last two stages of the 2015 Tour de Suisse.

The lengthy individual time trial featured a climb in the middle of it, but no mountains classification points were on offer. The course was technical and featured several turns. It was the same course that was raced four times in stage eight, except that the finish line was not situated at the same place. Midway through the stage, the riders took on the difficulty of the day, the 800-metre (2,624.7-foot) Liebewill climb. There were other small climbs situated on the course.

The final general classification of the race was decided on this stage, and a majority of the observers believed that Pinot would lose his lead since he is not a great time trialist. Geraint Thomas of Team Sky was only 34 seconds down coming into the stage and was among the favourites to take the overall victory. Tom Dumoulin (Team Giant–Alpecin) won the short prologue and was a contender for overall victory as a time trial specialist, but he had 1' 24" to make up. Another contender for the overall win was Simon Špilak of Team Katusha (47 seconds down). Fourth-placed Domenico Pozzovivo (AG2R La Mondiale) was an enigma, as he had mixed performances in time trials throughout his career. As far as the stage win was concerned, solo effort specialists Fabian Cancellara (Trek Factory Racing) and Adriano Malori (Movistar Team) were to be considered, but they had no chance of a victory in the general classification since they were too far down in the rankings.

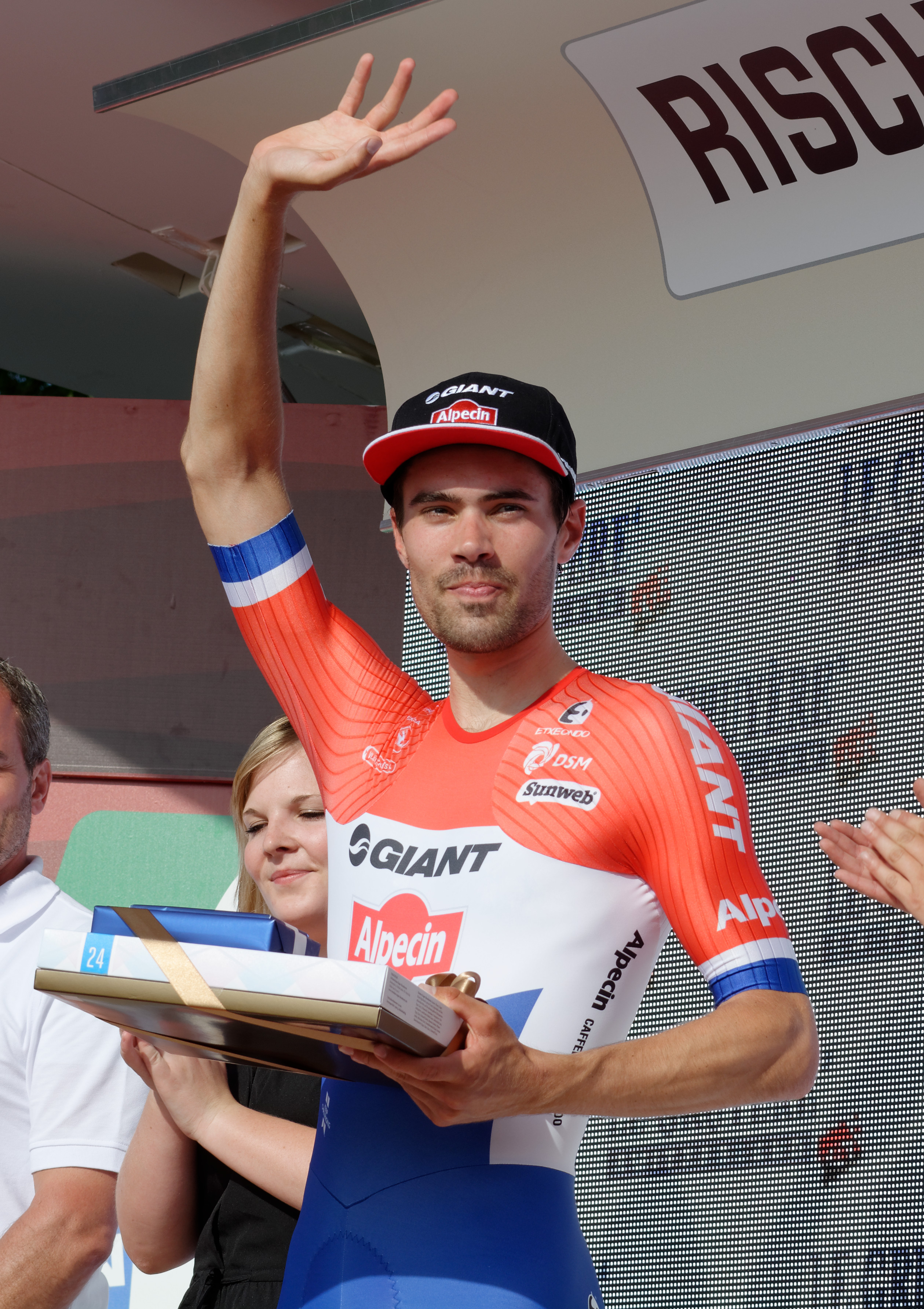
Tom Dumoulin of Team Giant–Alpecin won the ninth stage; he is seen here celebrating his victory in the opening stage.

The riders started in reverse order of the general classification, so Pinot was the last one to start. The riders went off the starting ramp in two-minute intervals. Cancellara got on course early, as he was the seventh man to start. He clocked a time of 48' 55", which would stay a reference for most of the day. He was followed out of the starting area by Matthias Brändle (IAM Cycling) who came in 2' 28" after Cancellara, somewhat surprisingly as he is a time trial specialist. Malori set the best time at the 21-kilometre (13.0-mile) intermediate point but faded a little bit in the end, coming to the finish line only 15 seconds off Cancellara's time. Cancellara would stay as a reference for a while now that some time trial specialists had finished their effort and failed to beat him. Damien Gaudin (AG2R La Mondiale) clocked in a time of 50' 46" which put him in sixth position.

Cameron Meyer (Orica–GreenEDGE) put in a time of 49' 43", 48 seconds off Cancellara's mark. Around that time, general classification hopeful Dumoulin started his time trial. Silvan Dillier (BMC Racing Team) provisionally slotted into sixth position with a time of 50' 19" and minutes later, race leader Pinot rolled down the starting ramp. Jérôme Coppel (IAM Cycling) crossed the finish line with a rapid time, only 25 seconds off Cancellara's performance. Meanwhile, in early time splits, Pinot had already lost twelve seconds to Thomas. The previous day's stage winner Alexey Lutsenko of Astana confirmed his good form with a time of 50' 32". At the 21-kilometre (13.0-mile) marker, Dumoulin beat Malori's best time by eleven seconds. Špilak was also doing a fast time trial, being equal to the best time at the 15.5-kilometre (9.6-mile) mark and passing the 21-kilometre (13.0-mile) arch faster than Dumoulin by four tenths of a second. By that time, Pinot had virtually lost his lead. Dumoulin took a very focused corner and he almost slammed into spectators upon exiting it, but no accident occurred. Špilak needed fourteen seconds over Thomas to get in front of him in the general classification. Dumoulin came in with a time nineteen seconds better than Cancellara's and won the stage with an average speed of 47.407 km/h (29.5 mph). Špilak came in with a time of 48' 54" and Thomas registered 49' 12", a difference of 18 seconds. Therefore, Špilak won the race overall by five seconds.

"I’m really happy and want to thank my teammates who helped me too much during the race. This is the biggest win of my career so far", Spilak said. "The time trial was really hard but I liked it. It was up and down all the way and that helped me. I gave it everything." It was the Slovenian's tenth victory in the professional ranks.

Stage 9 result
Rank	Rider	Team	Time
1	Tom Dumoulin (NED)	Team Giant–Alpecin	48' 36"
2	Simon Špilak (SLO)	Team Katusha	+ 18"
3	Fabian Cancellara (SWI)	Trek Factory Racing	+ 19"
4	Adriano Malori (ITA)	Movistar Team	+ 34"
5	Geraint Thomas (GBR)	Team Sky	+ 36"
6	Bob Jungels (LUX)	Trek Factory Racing	+ 41"
7	Jérôme Coppel (FRA)	IAM Cycling	+ 44"
8	Cameron Meyer (AUS)	Orica–GreenEDGE	+ 1' 07"
9	Rafał Majka (POL)	Tinkoff–Saxo	+ 1' 26"
10	Robert Gesink (NED)	LottoNL–Jumbo	+ 1' 32"

Final general classification
Rank	Rider	Team	Time
1	Simon Špilak (SLO)	Team Katusha	30h 15' 09"
2	Geraint Thomas (GBR)	Team Sky	+ 5"
3	Tom Dumoulin (NED)	Team Giant–Alpecin	+ 19"
4	Thibaut Pinot (FRA)	FDJ	+ 45"
5	Domenico Pozzovivo (ITA)	AG2R La Mondiale	+ 2' 21"
6	Bob Jungels (LUX)	Trek Factory Racing	+ 2' 58"
7	Miguel Ángel López (COL)	Astana	+ 3' 06"
8	Steve Morabito (SWI)	FDJ	+ 3' 17"
9	Robert Gesink (NED)	LottoNL–Jumbo	+ 3' 19"
10	Rafał Majka (POL)	Tinkoff–Saxo	+ 3' 20"

== Classification leadership ==
In the 2015 Tour de Suisse, three different jerseys were awarded. For the general classification, calculated by adding each cyclist's finishing times on each stage, and the leader received a yellow jersey. This classification was considered the most important of the Tour de Suisse, and the winner of the classification was considered the winner of the race. There was also a mountains classification, the leadership of which was marked by a light blue jersey. In the mountains classification, points were won by reaching the top of a climb before other cyclists, with more points available for the higher-categorised climbs. Hors Category gave 20 points to the first rider crossing (20, 15, 10, 6, 4), a Category 1 was worth 12 points (12, 8, 6, 4, 2), a Category 2 was worth 8 points (8, 6, 4, 2, 1) and a Category 3 was worth 5 points (5, 3, 2, 1).

The third jersey represented the points classification, marked by a white-and-red jersey. In the points classification, cyclists got points for finishing highly in a stage. A stage victory awarded 10 points, with 8 points for second, 6 for third, 4 for fourth and 2 for fifth. Points could also be earned at intermediate sprints location for finishing in the top three during each stage on a 6–3–1 scale. There was also a classification for teams, in which the times of the best three cyclists per team on each stage were added together; the leading team at the end of the race was the team with the lowest total time.

A combativity award was also attributed for the rider who had ridden the most aggressively in the eyes of the judges at the end of every stage. It could have been a rider who featured in breakaways or a cyclist who attacked often.

Classification leadership by stage
Stage	Winner	General classification	Mountains classification	Points classification	Team classification	Combativity award
1	Tom Dumoulin	Tom Dumoulin	not awarded	Tom Dumoulin	IAM Cycling	Tom Dumoulin
2	Kristijan Đurasek	Tom Dumoulin	Luka Pibernik	Tom Dumoulin	Astana	Cameron Meyer
3	Peter Sagan	Tom Dumoulin	~~Stefan Denifl~~	Daniel Moreno	Team Sky	~~Stefan Denifl~~
4	Michael Matthews	Tom Dumoulin	~~Stefan Denifl~~	Peter Sagan	Team Sky	Thomas De Gendt
5	Thibaut Pinot	Thibaut Pinot	~~Stefan Denifl~~	Peter Sagan	Team Sky	~~Stefan Denifl~~
6	Peter Sagan	Thibaut Pinot	~~Stefan Denifl~~	Peter Sagan	Team Sky	Marek Rutkiewicz
7	Alexander Kristoff	Thibaut Pinot	~~Stefan Denifl~~	Peter Sagan	Team Sky	Michał Kwiatkowski
8	Alexey Lutsenko	Thibaut Pinot	~~Stefan Denifl~~	Peter Sagan	Team Sky	Alexey Lutsenko
9	Tom Dumoulin	Simon Špilak	~~Stefan Denifl~~	Peter Sagan	Team Sky	Tom Dumoulin
Final		Simon Špilak	Thomas De Gendt	Peter Sagan	Team Sky	not awarded

== Classification standings ==
Legend
Yellow jersey	Denotes the leader of the general classification	Polka dot jersey	Denotes the leader of the mountains classification
Green jersey	Denotes the leader of the points classification		Denotes the leader of the teams classification

=== General classification ===
Result of general classification
Rank	Rider	Team	Time
1	Simon Špilak (SLO)	Team Katusha	30h 15' 09"
2	Geraint Thomas (GBR)	Team Sky	+ 5"
3	Tom Dumoulin (NED)	Team Giant–Alpecin	+ 19"
4	Thibaut Pinot (FRA)	FDJ	+ 45"
5	Domenico Pozzovivo (ITA)	AG2R La Mondiale	+ 2' 21"
6	Bob Jungels (LUX)	Trek Factory Racing	+ 2' 58"
7	Miguel Ángel López (COL)	Astana	+ 3' 06"
8	Steve Morabito (SWI)	FDJ	+ 3' 17"
9	Robert Gesink (NED)	LottoNL–Jumbo	+ 3' 19"
10	Rafał Majka (POL)	Tinkoff–Saxo	+ 3' 20"

=== Points classification ===
Result of points classification
Rank	Rider	Team	Points
1	Peter Sagan (SVK)	Tinkoff–Saxo	43
2	Tom Dumoulin (NED)	Team Giant–Alpecin	28
3	Alexey Lutsenko (KAZ)	Astana	23
4	Thibaut Pinot (FRA)	FDJ	20
5	Jürgen Roelandts (BEL)	Lotto–Soudal	20
6	Jan Bakelants (BEL)	AG2R La Mondiale	17
7	Alexander Kristoff (NOR)	Team Katusha	16
8	Daniel Moreno (SPA)	Team Katusha	16
9	Simon Špilak (SLO)	Team Katusha	14
10	Fabian Cancellara (SWI)	Trek Factory Racing	14

=== Mountains classification ===
Result of mountains classification
Rank	Rider	Team	Points
DSQ	~~Stefan Denifl~~ (AUT)	~~IAM Cycling~~	~~63~~
1	Thomas De Gendt (BEL)	Lotto–Soudal	33
3	Thibaut Pinot (FRA)	FDJ	22
4	Luka Pibernik (SLO)	Lampre–Merida	22
5	Daryl Impey (RSA)	Orica–GreenEDGE	21
6	Axel Domont (FRA)	AG2R La Mondiale	18
7	Cameron Meyer (AUS)	Orica–GreenEDGE	16
8	Branislau Samoilau (BLR)	CCC–Sprandi–Polkowice	16
9	Marco Marcato (ITA)	Wanty–Groupe Gobert	16
10	Jan Bakelants (BEL)	AG2R La Mondiale	15

=== Teams classification ===
Result of teams classification
Rank	Team	Time
1	Team Sky	90h 55' 38"
2	Trek Factory Racing	+ 11' 49"
3	IAM Cycling	+ 15' 08"
4	Astana	+ 18' 43"
5	BMC Racing Team	+ 22' 33"
6	Team Giant–Alpecin	+ 26' 44"
7	AG2R La Mondiale	+ 31' 04"
8	Orica–GreenEDGE	+ 31' 15"
9	FDJ	+ 31' 35"
10	LottoNL–Jumbo	+ 38' 49"
