= Ötztal Glacier Road =

High-elevation paved road in Austria

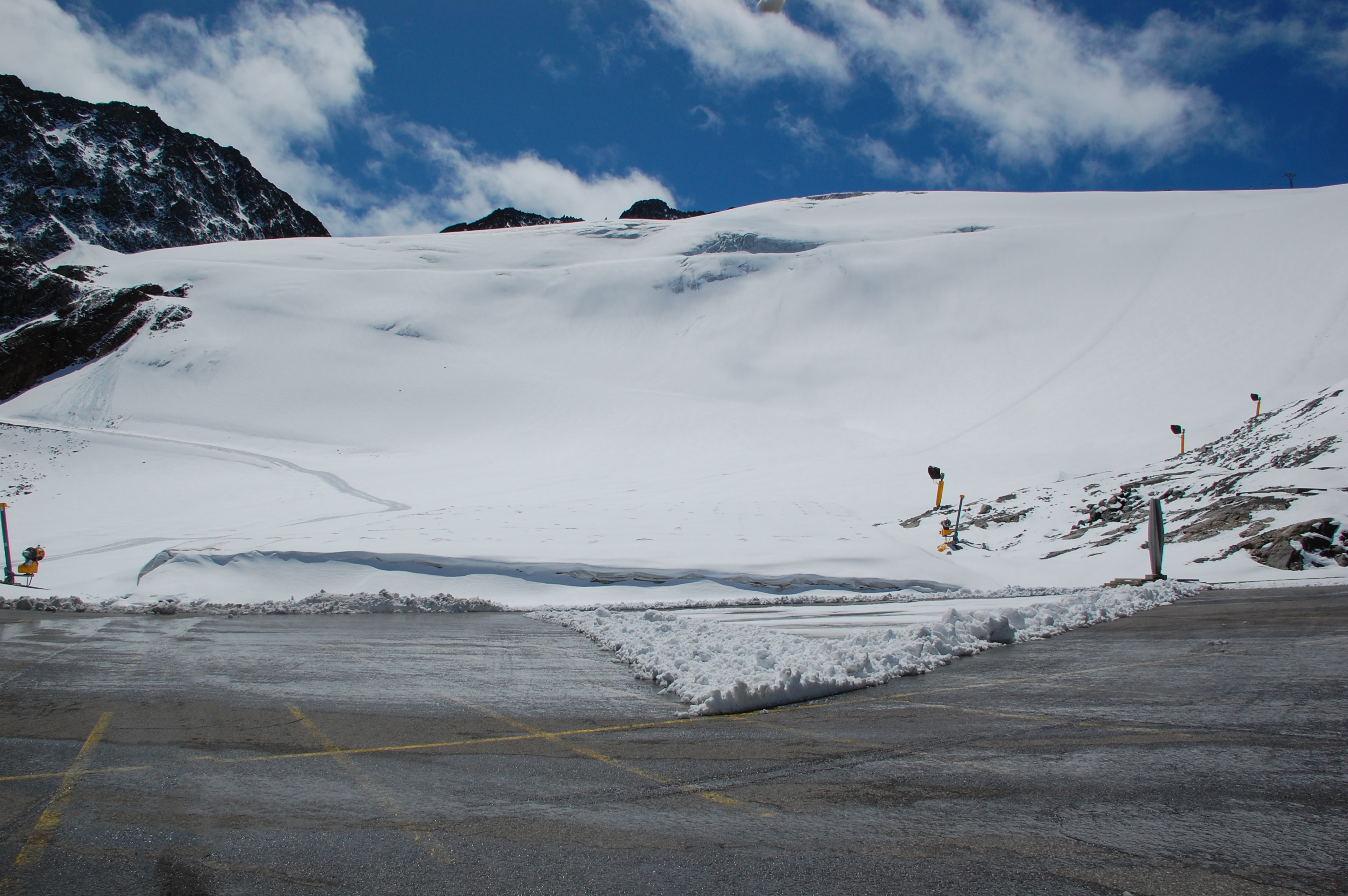
- Rettenbach glacier

- Location within Alps
- Elevation: 2,829 metres (9,281 ft)
- Traversed by: Road

Third Approach
- Location: Austria
- Coordinates: 46°55′29″N 10°56′40″E

The Ötztal Glacier Road, (German: Ötztaler Gletscherstraße), at 2,830 m (9,285 ft), is the second highest paved road in Europe. It is the access road from Sölden to the Rettenbach glacier and Tiefenbachferner glacier in the Ötztal Alps. It was built in 1972 as a spur from the existing Hochsölden road. The road climbs the Rettenbach valley from Sölden in the Ötztal valley in Tyrol. Near the top of the valley, the foot of the Rettenbach glacier, the road turns south and continues climbing through a ski tunnel—the second highest road tunnel in Europe—where the highest point of the road is at the southern end of the tunnel. From there it descends to the ski station at the foot of the Tiefenbachferner glacier.

== See also ==
- List of highest paved roads in Europe
- List of mountain passes
