= Rettenbach glacier =

Glacier in Austria

Coordinates: 46°56′35.06″N 10°55′47.11″E

Rettenbach glacier Rettenbachferner / Rettenbachgletscher
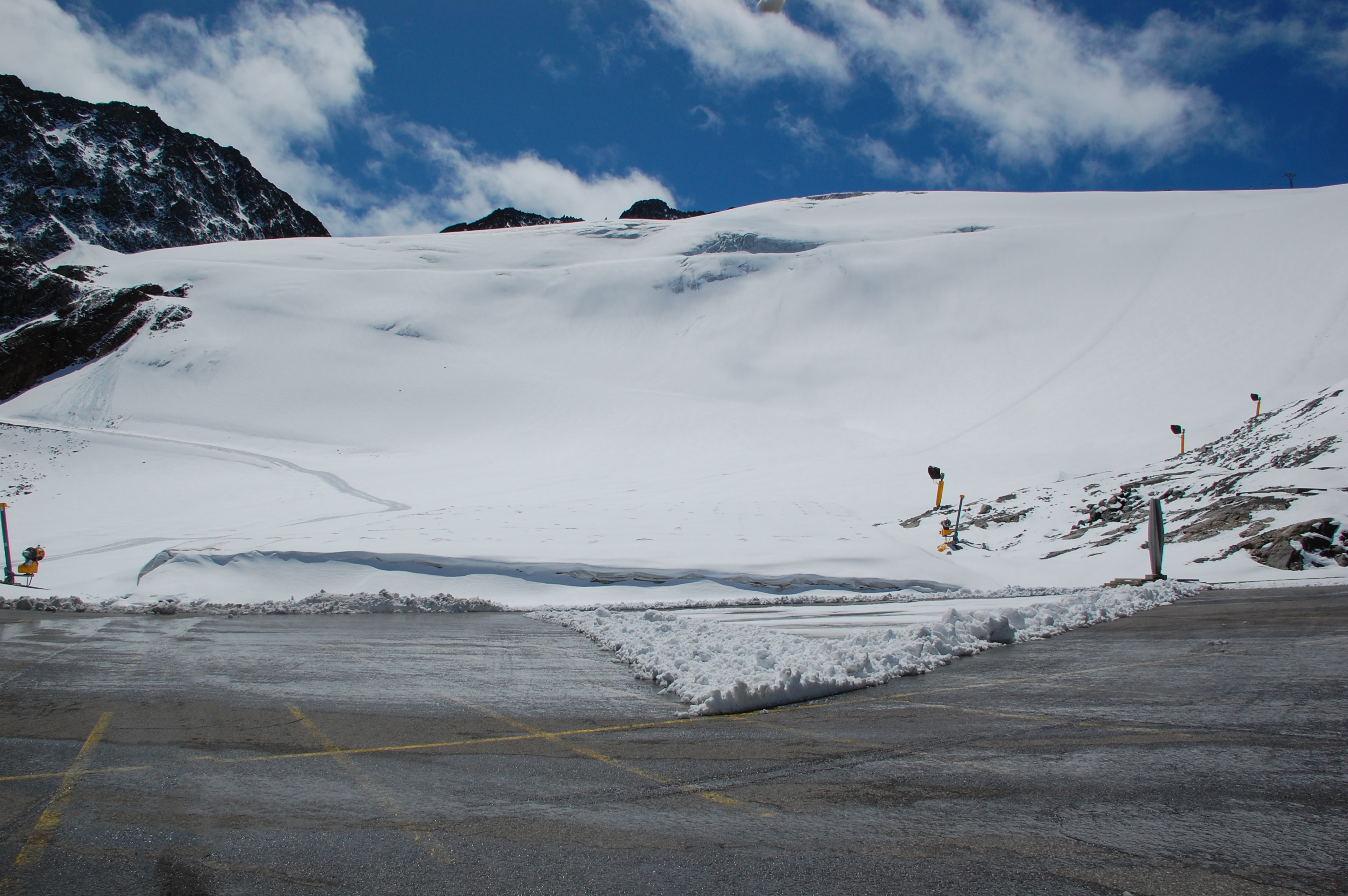

Highest point
- Elevation: 3,350 m (10,990 ft)

Geography
- Location: Sölden, Ötztal Alps, Tyrol, Austria

The Rettenbach glacier (german: Rettenbachferner or. Rettenbachgletscher) is a glacier in Europe, located near Sölden in the Ötztal Alps of Tyrol, Austria.

During the winter, the glacier is accessible by cable car and from spring time by car, using the Gletscherstraße.

The glacier is also an attractive area for regular skiers and plays an important role in connecting the main ski area of Sölden with the Tiefenbach glacier.

== Alpine skiing ==
Since 2000, Rettenbach is a traditional World Cup season opening host with giant slalom in late October, for both men and women.

Location in Tyrol
Location in the Alps

== Fatal accidents ==
On January 5, 2015, two prospects for the United States ski team, Ronnie Berlack and Bryce Astle, were killed by an avalanche they triggered near Rettenbach glacier.

On 17 November 2015, Slovenian ex skier Drago Grubelnik died in a car accident on the 7th curve at 2,455 m (AA) down the road, not far away from a World Cup finish area.
