= Mehedine Ben Mohamed Azouz =

- Born: 1914; La Messéha, French Algeria
- Died: August 19, 1944 (aged 29–30); Rioupéroux, France
- Occupation: Resistance fighter
- Organization: Maquis de l'Oisans

Mehedine Ben Mohamed Azouz (1914 – 19 August 1944) (in Arabic: محي الدين بن محمد عزوز), also known as Mohedine Azouz, was an Algerian resistance fighter of the Maquis de l'Oisans executed by the Gestapo. His body was found in a mass grave in Livet-et-Gavet.

== Youth ==
Mehedine Ben Mohamed Azouz was born in La Messéha in 1914; his parents' names were Mohamed and Sabira Bent Kaddour (meaning "daughter of Kaddour"). He settled in Livet-et-Gavet, in Isère, where he worked as a laborer.

== Resistance ==
During World War II, Azouz joined the Armée secrète, the Maquis de l'Oisans, and the Lamy company, alongside one of his Algerian comrades, Yahi Saïd. In 1944, both resistance fighters were arrested by the Gestapo and tortured. In August 1944, as Operation Dragoon allowed the Allied forces to seize the South of France and quickly advance towards Isère, Azouz and Saïd were each summarily executed by a gunshot to the back of the neck. Their bodies were found in mass graves in the vicinity of Livet-et-Gavet.

== Legacy ==
Azouz was recognized by the Ministry of Defense, and his name appears on the memorials of the Maquis de l'Oisans.
