= Yahi Saïd =

- Born: 1902; Dar El Mizan, French Algeria
- Died: August 19, 1944; Rioupéroux
- Occupation: Resistance fighter

Yahi Saïd (in Arabic: ياحي سعيد) (1902- August 19, 1944), born around 1902 in Dar El Mizan, French Algeria, and executed on August 19, 1944, in Rioupéroux, was an Algerian resistance fighter of the Maquis de l'Oisans, executed by the Gestapo. His body was found in a mass grave in Livet-et-Gavet.

== Youth ==
Yahi Saïd was born in Dar El Mizan in 1902; his parents' names were Seliman and Amziaï Sadior. He settled in Livet-et-Gavet, in Isère, where he worked as a laborer.

== Resistance ==
During World War II, Saïd joined the Armée secrète and joined the Maquis de l'Oisans and the Lamy company along with one of his Algerian comrades, Mehedine Ben Mohamed Azouz. In 1944, the two resistance fighters were arrested by the Gestapo and subsequently tortured. Finally, in August 1944, as Operation Dragoon allowed the Allied forces to seize the south of France and quickly advance towards Isère, they were both summarily executed with a shot to the back of the neck. Their bodies were found in mass graves in the vicinity of Livet-et-Gavet.

== Legacy ==
Since Yahi Saïd was celibate, had no children, and his parents were deceased, he was not recognized by the Ministry of Defense. However, his name appears on commemorative plaques in Isère, although it is sometimes misspelled.
