= Maquis de l'Oisans =

French resistance group

Oisans topographic map, corresponding roughly to the Oisans maquis' area of operations

During the Second World War, the Oisans maquis was an important center for the French Resistance, in the Oisans region between the Belledonne range and Grenoble to the north, the Grandes Rousses massif of the Alps and the Croix de Fer pass to the east, the Drac valley to the west and the Barre des Écrins and the Provencal Alps to the south.

Oisans contains and follows the Romanche valley from its source to its confluence with the Drac.

== Situation and importance ==
Topographically, the Romanche basin (a tributary of the Isère) is a particularly deep valley. Situated between Grenoble and Italy, it contains one of the few roads between the Mediterranean and Switzerland that allow traffic to flow towards Italy.

Anticipating an Allied landing in Provence, the German army wanted to keep this route open as a path of retreat to Italy . In addition, they needed to ensure the supply of aluminum and magnesium from the "Lower Romansh" to Germany. The Oisans and its roads were thus doubly strategic for the Germans, as soon as they occupied the south of France.

The Oisans maquis, from November 1943 onwards, coordinated the Resistance within the city of Grenoble as well as in the mountains, the only group in the historic region of the Dauphiné (and perhaps in all of France) responsible for both urban and mountain combat.

== Start ==
On 22 June 1940, the French government signed the armistice. Certain officers or military cadres continued fighting, forming troops and Resistance groups.

This was the case of Lieutenant André Lespiau: after having been ordered to the 9th Colonial Towed Artillery Regiment (9e régiment d’artillerie coloniale tractée) for his conduct at fire in June 1940, he joined the head office of the Colonial Troops in Fréjus, then joined the Armée Secrète (Secret Army) in the Var. There, he was christened "Lanvin".

He would later become famous as "captain" of about 1,500 men of the Oisans maquis.

From the end of November 1942 on, the ranks of the maquis swelled with the introduction of the Service du Travail Obligatoire (STO). Many young people went underground and took to the mountains to avoid forced labor in Nazi Germany.

Captain André Lespiau was assigned to the Groupements Militaires d'Indigènes Coloniaux Rapatriables (GMICR) in Fréjus.

Large Resistance groups formed in the Alps: Savoie/Haute-Savoie, Isère, Ain, Drôme, Hautes-Alpes, Alpes de Haute-Provence. Lespiau was appointed in February 1943, to command the 14th Company of the 1st Sub-Group of the 1st GMICR in Jarrie, Isère - neighbour to the 13th Company, in Pont-de-Claix.

The Alpine maquis groups took shape under the command of General Delestraint (alias "Vidal"), then Alain Le Ray of the French Forces of the Interior). In Oisans, different groups united under Lanvin, to control the area ("Sector 1") from Grenoble to the gates of Savoy in the east and as far south as Lavaldens. Another maquis was responsible for the southern part of the Oisans region (called "Sector 5"), which overflowed into the Trièves (Notre-Dame-de-Commiers, Monestier-de-Clermont, La Mure, Valbonnais).

=== Organisation ===
Led by a professional soldier, the Oisans maquis maintained a quasi-military structure. Its 1,526 men and women were divided into five "action" sections of 150 fighters each; the others carried out tasks such as supply, intelligence, surveillance, and maintenance.

== 1943 ==
On December 20, at the Alma barracks in Grenoble, Captain Lespiau ("Lanvin") was given command of "Sector 1" of the Secret Army by Commander Sylvain, who had led the Grenoble Resistance until then. At the end of November 1943, the Gestapo and the Milice had dealt a coup de grâce to the Grenoble organisation by capturing its leaders.

Three months later, André Lespiau was declared a "deserter" by his army officers. His father, Captain Paul Lespiau (a decorated veteran of the First World War and member of the Turma Vengeance network) was arrested in reprisal and deported to Buchenwald, where he died. Captain "Lanvin-Lespiau" was now completely underground.

The Maquis de l'Oisans had at its service men and women of many nationalities and origins. Lanvin was of Catalan origin and had served in the colonial troops with Indochinese and African riflemen under his command. Among his recruits were Poles, Russians, Tunisians, Algerians, Spaniards, and others. "Oisans" also had a Catholic chaplain and a rabbi in its ranks.

== 1944 ==
=== French Forces of the Interior hospital ===
In addition to its activities against the German and Militia forces, the Oisans maquis was responsible for the French Forces of the Interior hospital for all of the Isère.

A small chalet ("Le Chalet du Signal") was made available to the F.F.I. in early July 1944 by its owner. A surgical block was installed there by Captain Robert Tissot, a doctor and soldier, to treat the maquis wounded; he himself brought 10kg of his own surgical equipment.

At the beginning of August, after defeating the maquis of the Vercors and Glières (Savoy), the German 157th Division attempted to encircle Oisans, finish the maquis there, and free the critical road to Italy.

This manoeuvre forced the hospital and its patients to flee to higher ground, erasing all trace of their passage in the chalet and the village of Alpe d'Huez, while the para-military groups organised the counter-attack. Two groups were evacuated: on the one hand, the most able-bodied patients and some of the medical staff hid in the forest; on the other, the seriously wounded (including two amputees) left with the rest of the medical staff on 11 August at 11 am. Inhabitants made a hedge of honour to this fleeing column.

The maquisards were assisted in this evacuation by 11 American soldiers, crew of a "B-24 Liberator" which had crashed a few days earlier in the Hautes-Alpes and who had been taken by the maquis to this field hospital, since their pilot was wounded. The Americans carried stretchers, transported equipment, carried out reconnaissance missions and hid food and bandages.

On the evening of 11 August 1944, the most seriously-wounded soldiers of the F.F.I. settled with their caretakers at l'Alpette, a few kilometres and 300 metres from the La Fare refuge in Oz-en-Oisans. The barns were used as treatment and restrooms. But on the 14th, while it was still dark, the makeshift hospital had to evacuate because German troops were getting dangerously close. The refuge was 300 m higher and it was impossible to transport the wounded on stretchers, since the terrain was so steep. The amputees were hidden in rocks at the bottom of this promontory, each with a caregiver.

During the night of August 14 to 15, the F.F.I. fighters of "Mobile Group No. 4" arrived, under the command of Lieutenant Menton. They took up positions to the north and east of the Alpette, blocking the Germans' advance on their comrades. The battle lasted five to six hours and resulted in about 20 deaths on the German side and no casualties on the French side. The "battle of Grandes Rousses" remains as one of the rare victorious direct confrontations against the German army for the maquis, more accustomed to ambushes and isolated actions than to face-to-face battle.

But, despite this victory, the pursuit by the Bavarian Alpine Hunters was not over and what remained of the Germans were determined to capture or kill the hospital team.

On the morning of 15 August, the Germans spotted the wounded and the hospital staff at the La Fare hut; the group then set off again towards Lac La Fare, where they found a hut full of maquisards who had come from the north after fighting at the Glandon pass. With German troops having occupied the Romanche valley for four days now, there was only one way out for the patients and their companions: to go up towards the east. Without equipment and weapons, they hid for several days in a wall on the edge of the glacier, eating "Brun" (fr) biscuits and a captured sheep that they devoured almost raw.

For a few days, the Rajon shelter at Lac La Fare became the highest hospital in the world, at an altitude of 2,645 metres.

== Epilogue ==
On 22 August 1944 at 5am, the "Groupe Franc d'Uriage" was the first unit of armed men to enter a liberated Grenoble, after the Germans fled in the night, and a few hours before the Americans also arrived. In the South Isère, the Germans had to surrender to the local Resistance (the "terrorists"), not to the Free French military, or to the allied American and British forces.

On the same day, the mobile groups of the Oisans maquis joined up with the 1st battalion of the 143rd American infantry regiment in Vizille. A short and intense battle took hundreds of German prisoners at the Château de Vizille.

At the end of August 1944, Oisans and Grenoble regained their freedom, but the war was not over. Numerous maquisards from the Oisans continued to fight, notably forming the 1st Colonial Infantry Battalion (1st B.I.C.) and the Colonial Artillery Group (1er G.A.C.) which distinguished themselves in the Maurienne fights.

At the end of 1944, the 1st B.I.C. became the 11th Battalion of "Oisans" Alpine Hunters (11th B.C.A.) and the 1st G.A.C. became the 93rd Mountain Artillery Regiment (93e R.A.M.). Both covered themselves with glory at the Mont Froid battle in the Drôme. The 93rd R.A.M. keeps a faithful memory of it. Other maquisards from the Oisans chose to join and fight in the 1st French Army led by General Jean de Lattre de Tassigny.

== Official recognition ==
In spite of its central role in the liberation of Grenoble and the Isère département, the Oisans maquis has little national and international renown, compared to the Vercors or the Savoie maquis, for example. The memory concerning it rarely goes beyond the communal or departmental scale.

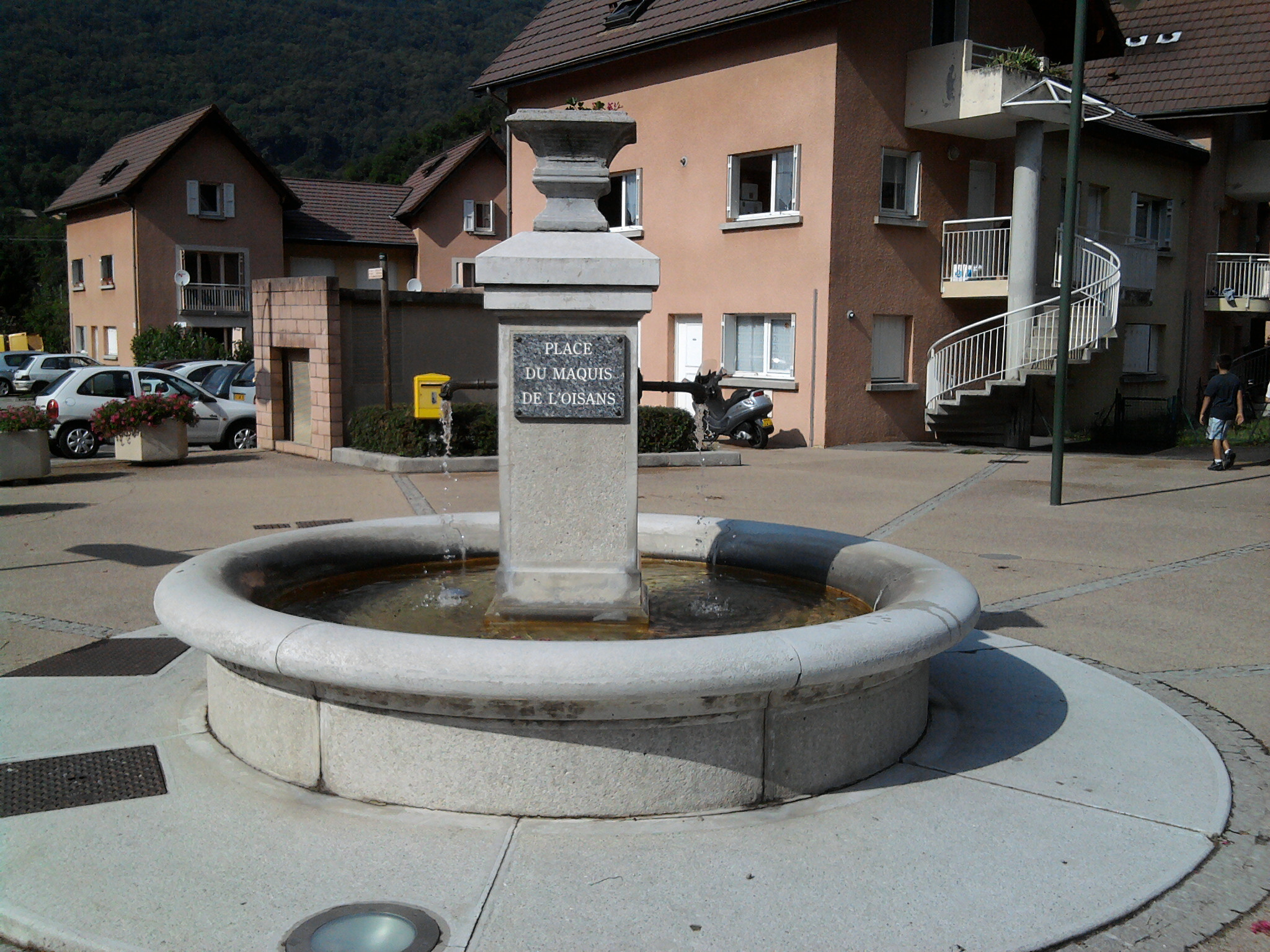
Place du maquis de l'Oisans, in Séchilienne

A monument to the dead of the Oisans maquis was built at Livet-et-Gavet, the Mémorial de l'Infernet.

A memorial plaque has been placed at the La Fare lake (Vaujany commune) with the following text: Dans ce modeste refuge et alentour séjourna au cours de l’été 1944, l’Hôpital Départemental des Forces Françaises de l’Intérieur qui, sous la direction de son médecin chef le docteur Robert TISSOT couvert par un groupe de protection maquisard, aidé par 11 hommes d’un équipage de l’U.S. Air Force, dû se replier sous la pression des Alpenjager de la 157ème Division Alpine Bavaroise. Après l’arrêt brutal de l’avance allemande par le groupe mobile n°4 du maquis de l’Oisans à la bataille des Grandes Rousses le 14 août 1944, la totalité des personnels et blessés de l’Hôpital purent regagner Grenoble libéré. Translated as:

In this modest refuge and its surroundings, the Departmental Hospital of the French Forces of the Interior stayed during the summer of 1944. Under the direction of its chief doctor, Doctor Robert TISSOT, who was covered by a Maquis protection group, assisted by 11 men of a U.S. Air Force crew, the hospital had to withdraw under pressure from the Alpenjager of the 157th Bavarian Alpine Division. After a brutal halt of the German advance by the mobile group n°4 of the maquis de l'Oisans at the battle of Grandes Rousses on 14 August 1944, all the staff and wounded of the Hospital were able to return to liberated Grenoble. »

Several streets have been named "rue du Maquis de l'Oisans", notably in Vizille and Bourg d'Oisans.

=== Events ===
In 2014, the Palais des sports et des congrès de l'Alpe d'Huez hosted a temporary exhibition on the Oisans maquis.

== See also ==
- Troupes coloniales
- Liberation of France
- Grenoble's Saint-Bartholomew

== Bibliography ==
- La Libération entre Alpes et Rhône, Olivier Cogne, Éditions le Dauphiné libéré, Grenoble, 2014 (ISBN 978-2-8110-0045-5)

== External pages ==
- Alpe d'Huez TV documentary on the 2014 Alpe d'Huez exhibition
