= Les Deux Alpes, Isère =

Les Deux Alpes
- Commune
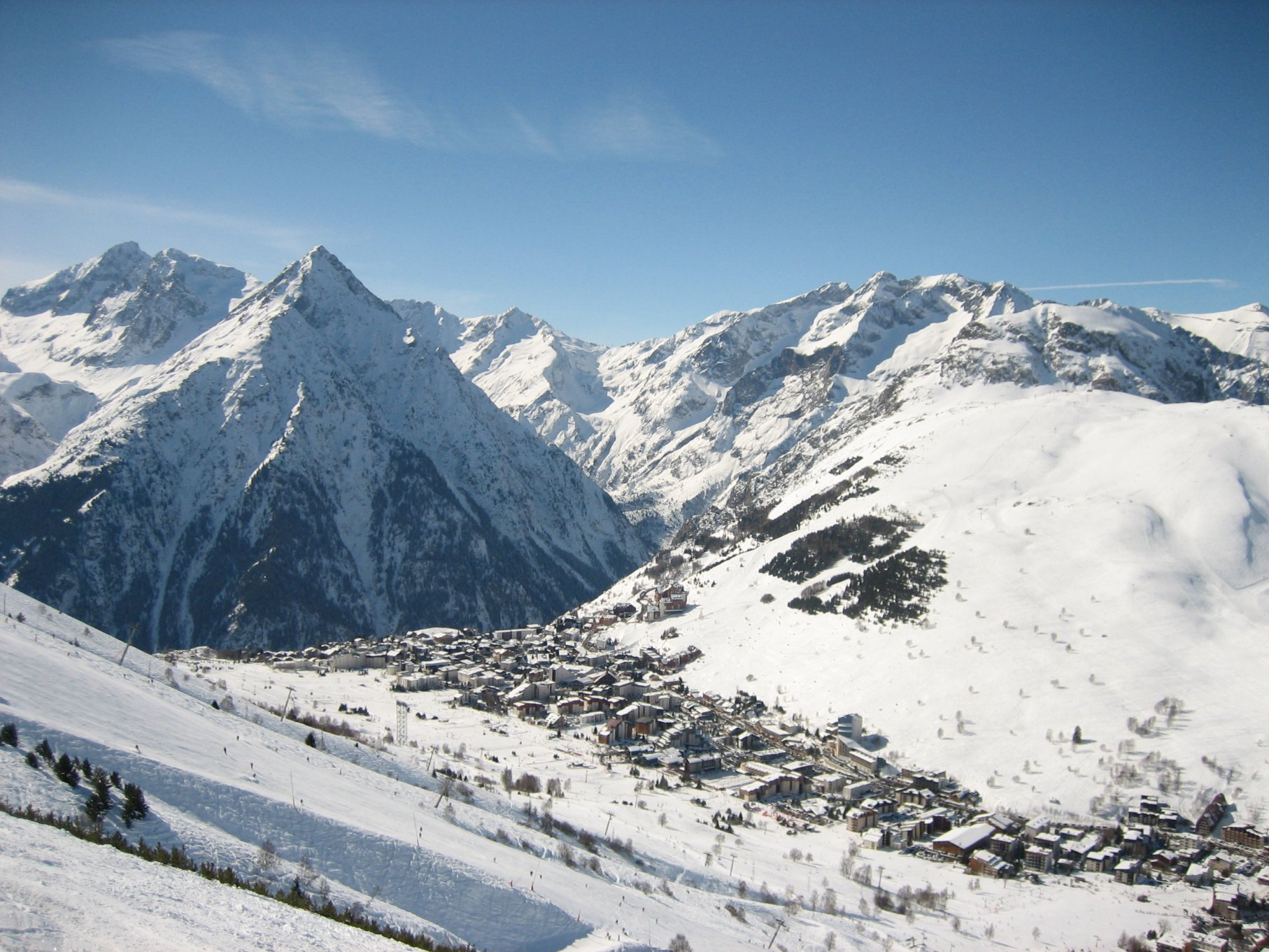
- Les Deux Alpes ski resort
- Location of Les Deux Alpes
- Location within France Location within Auvergne-Rhône-Alpes
- Coordinates: 45°41′20″N 5°25′48″E
- Country: France
- Region: Auvergne-Rhône-Alpes
- Department: Isère
- Arrondissement: Grenoble
- Canton: Oisans-Romanche
- Intercommunality: Oisans

Government
  - Mayor (2023–2026): Stéphane Sauvebois
- Area^{1}: 56.8 km^{2} (21.9 sq mi)
- Population (2023): 1,910
  - Density: 33.6/km^{2} (87.1/sq mi)
- Time zone: UTC+01:00 (CET)
  - Summer (DST): UTC+02:00 (CEST)
- INSEE/Postal code: 38253 /38860
- ^{1} French Land Register data, which excludes lakes, ponds, glaciers > 1 km^{2} (0.386 sq mi or 247 acres) and river estuaries.

Les Deux Alpes (French pronunciation: [le dø.z‿alp]) is a commune in the department of Isère, southeastern France. The municipality was established on 1 January 2017 by merger of the former communes of Mont-de-Lans (the seat) and Vénosc. The ski resort Les Deux Alpes is situated in the commune.

== See also ==
- Communes of the Isère department
