= Col de Sarenne =

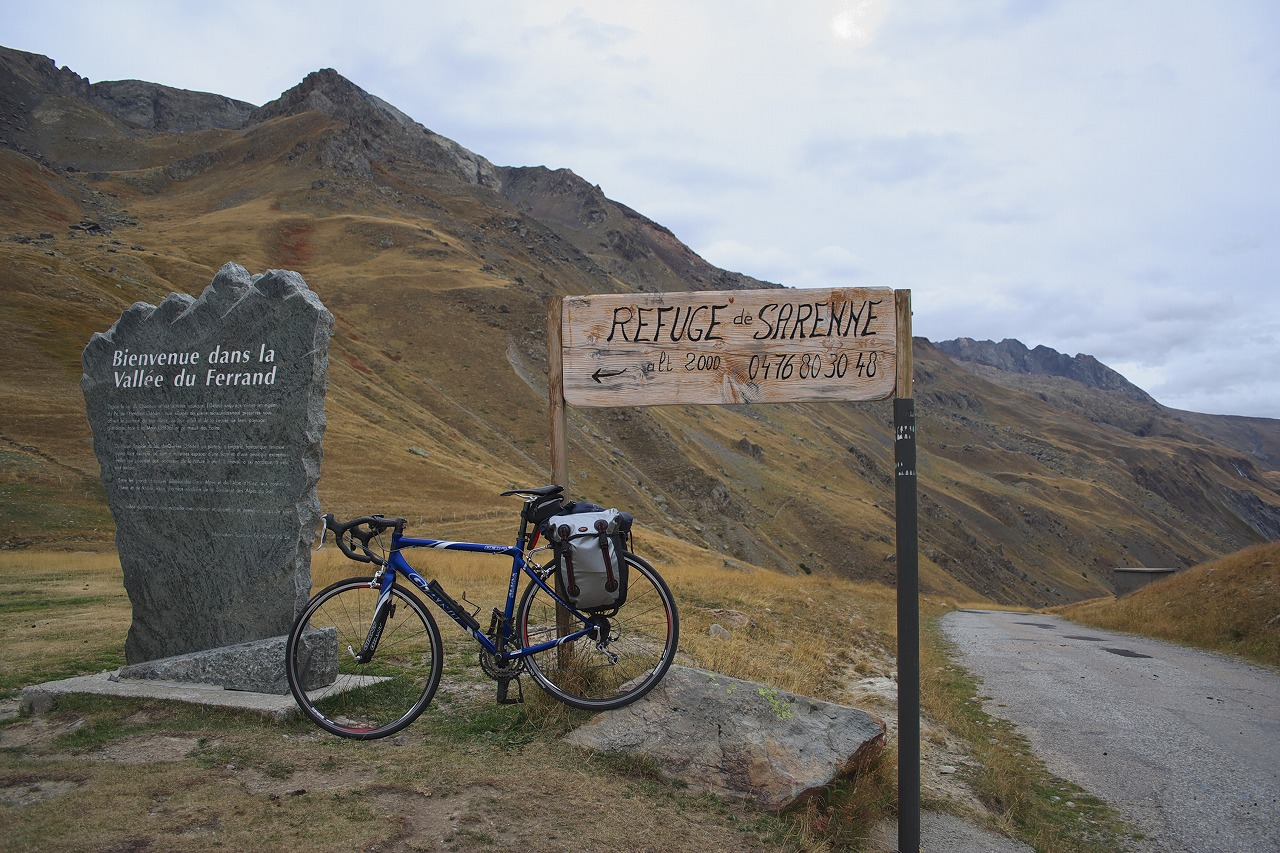
- Col de Sarenne

- Location within Alps
- Elevation: 1,999 m (6,558 ft)
- Traversed by: Unnamed road / D25

Third Approach
- Location: Isère, France
- Range: Grandes Rousses / Alps
- Coordinates: 45°5′15″N 6°8′57″E

Col de Sarenne (1,999 m (6,558 ft)) is a mountain pass located in the Grandes Rousses massif, approximately 9 km (6 mi) east of Alpe d'Huez in the Isère department of France. The pass connects Alpe d'Huez with the villages of Mizoën and Le Freney-d'Oisans in the Romanche valley. The road over the pass was used on Stage 18 of the 2013 Tour de France bicycle race as this loops round to enable the cyclists to climb the Alpe d'Huez twice in the same stage. The col was used in Stage 20 of the 2026 Tour de France, as a Hors catégorie climb. This was the first time the Tour used the full ascent of the Sarenne, with Sepp Kuss leading over the summit.

== Details of the climb ==
From Alpe d'Huez, the route used on the Tour de France follows an unnamed road initially, descending to 1,765 m (5,791 ft) before the final climb to the summit which is 3 km (1.9 mi) long at an average gradient of 7.8%.

From the south, the road to the pass follows the D25 from its junction with the D1091 to the east of Le Freney-d'Oisans. From here, the road is 12.8 km (8.0 mi) km long, climbing 954 m (3,130 ft) at an average of 7.5%, although the first kilometre to Mizoën has a gradient of 11.5% and the maximum gradient is 13.5% at 3 km (1.9 mi) from the summit.

The passage over the summit was used in the 2013 Tour de France; following that race, German rider Tony Martin criticized the decision of the Tour de France organisers to use the pass, saying: "The road is old and narrow. It’s a bad road, no guardrails. A mistake could see you falling straight down 30 metres. It's irresponsible to send us there." Martin repeated his criticisms on the eve of the Tour de France: It’s still the same descent. … It’s quite nasty and a really dangerous descent. We’ve made a lot of comments already in the media, so I really hope the organization heard it.

In the race, the summit was crossed first by a group of four riders, led by Tejay van Garderen. On the descent, van Garderen had a technical problem with his bike, and Christophe Riblon left the road on a corner before going on to win the stage at the top of Alpe d'Huez.
