= Le Bourg-d'Oisans =

- Commune
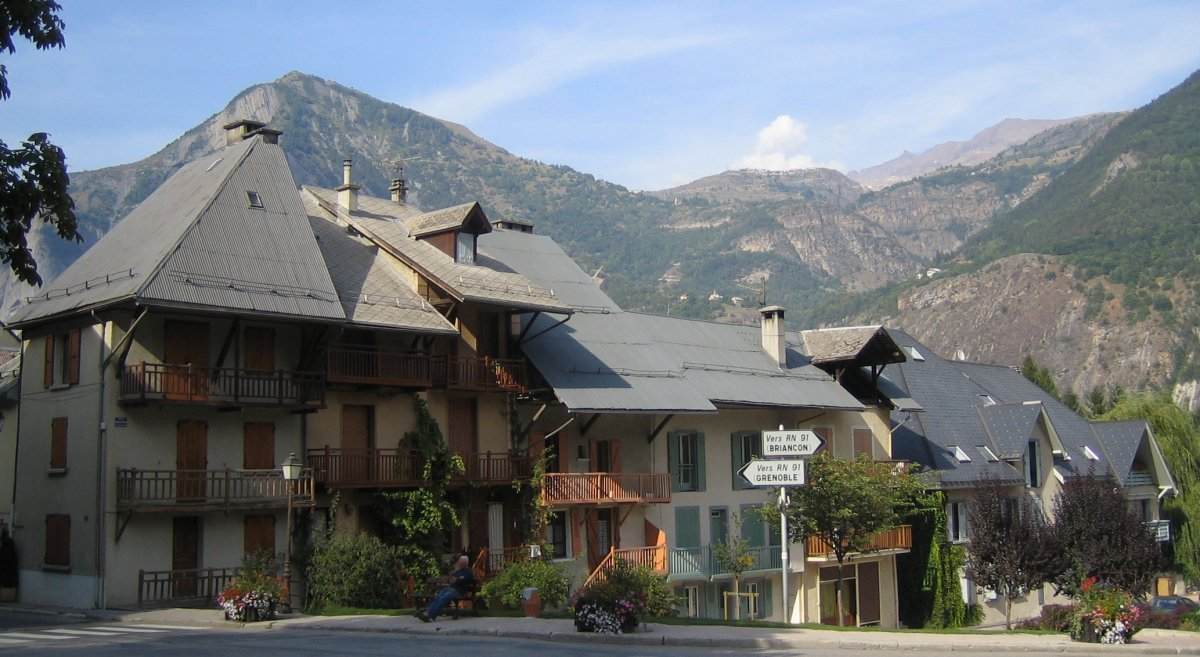
- Le Bourg-d'Oisans. In the background the Grandes Rousses massif and the Alpe d'Huez

- Coat of arms
- Location of Le Bourg-d'Oisans
- Location within France Location within Auvergne-Rhône-Alpes
- Coordinates: 45°03′21″N 6°01′49″E
- Country: France
- Region: Auvergne-Rhône-Alpes
- Department: Isère
- Arrondissement: Grenoble
- Canton: Oisans-Romanche

Government
  - Mayor (2020–2026): Bruno Aymoz (2026-)
- Area^{1}: 36 km^{2} (14 sq mi)
- Elevation: 720 m (2,360 ft)
- Highest elevation: 3,121 m (10,240 ft)
- Lowest elevation: 701 m (2,300 ft)
- Population (2023): 2,617
  - Density: 73/km^{2} (190/sq mi)
- Time zone: UTC+01:00 (CET)
  - Summer (DST): UTC+02:00 (CEST)
- INSEE/Postal code: 38052 /38520
- ^{1} French Land Register data, which excludes lakes, ponds, glaciers > 1 km^{2} (0.386 sq mi or 247 acres) and river estuaries.

Le Bourg-d'Oisans (French pronunciation: [lə buʁ dwazˈɑ̃]) is a commune in the Isère department in southeastern France.

It is located in the Oisans region of the French Alps. Le Bourg-d'Oisans is located in the valley of the Romanche River, on the road from Grenoble to Briançon and on the south side of the Col de la Croix de Fer. It is often on the route of the Tour de France, as the town sits at the base of the road climbing to Alpe d'Huez with 21 hairpin bends.

It is surrounded by several well-known mountain resorts, such as the Alpe d'Huez and Les Deux Alpes. The Écrins National Park lies to the southeast of Le Bourg-d'Oisans.

== Population ==
Historical population

Year	Pop.	±% p.a.
1793	1,992	—
1800	2,079	+0.61%
1806	2,383	+2.30%
1821	2,473	+0.25%
1831	3,052	+2.13%
1836	3,019	−0.22%
1841	3,196	+1.15%
1846	3,355	+0.98%
1851	3,212	−0.87%
1856	2,760	−2.99%
1861	2,796	+0.26%
1866	2,772	−0.17%
1872	2,773	+0.01%
1876	2,658	−1.05%
1881	2,650	−0.06%
1886	2,550	−0.77%
1891	2,543	−0.05%
1896	2,375	−1.36%
1901	2,618	+1.97%

Year	Pop.	±% p.a.
1906	2,587	−0.24%
1911	2,624	+0.28%
1921	2,112	−2.15%
1926	2,262	+1.38%
1931	2,239	−0.20%
1936	2,395	+1.36%
1946	2,375	−0.08%
1954	2,150	−1.24%
1962	2,189	+0.22%
1968	2,280	+0.68%
1975	2,448	+1.02%
1982	3,027	+3.08%
1990	2,911	−0.49%
1999	2,984	+0.28%
2007	3,352	+1.46%
2012	3,228	−0.75%
2017	3,278	+0.31%
2023	2,617	−3.68%

Source: EHESS and INSEE (1968-2023)

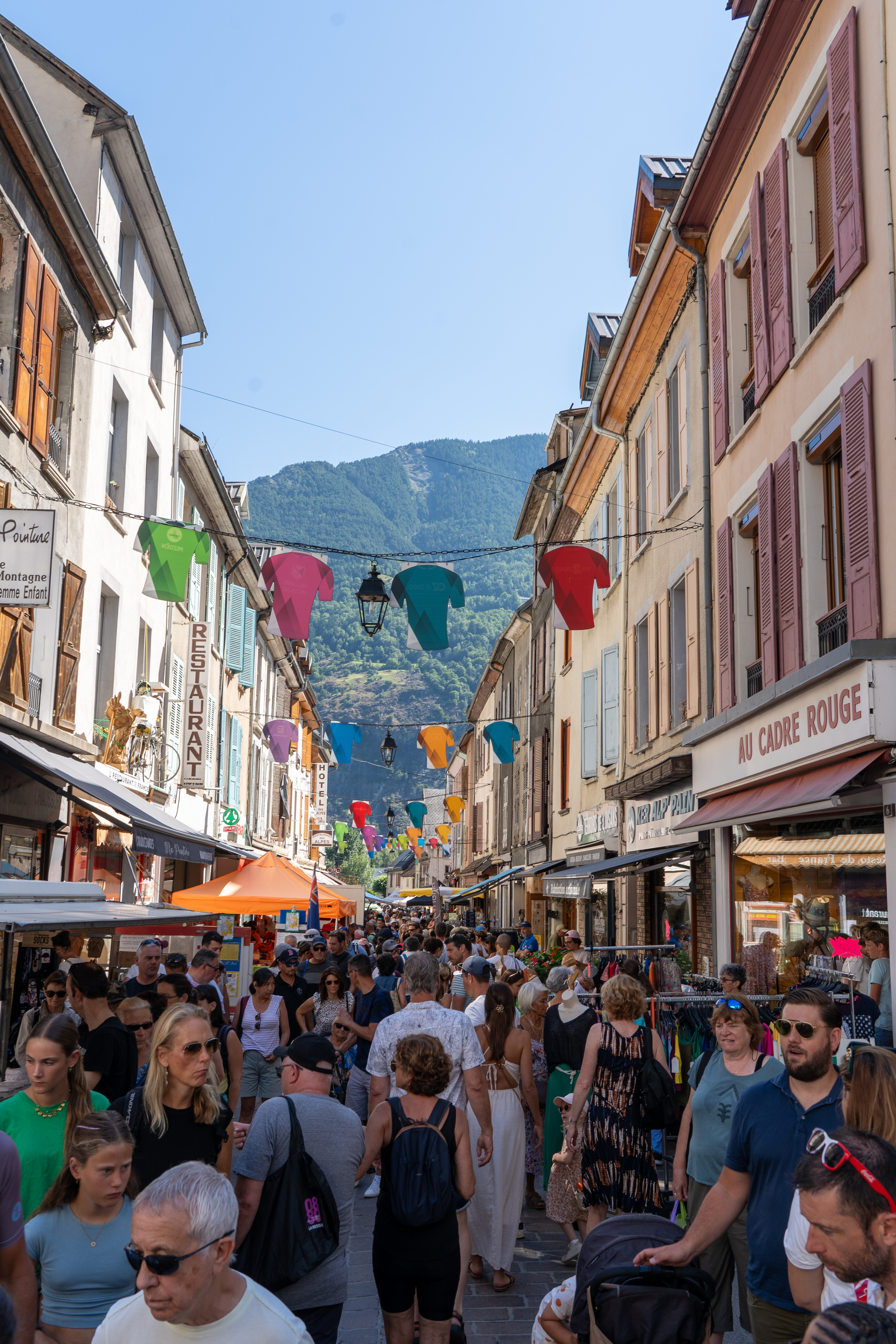
Tourist market on Saturday during the summer season.

== See also ==
- Communes of the Isère department
- Livet-et-Gavet
- Alpe d'Huez
