= Romanche (river) =

River in southeastern France

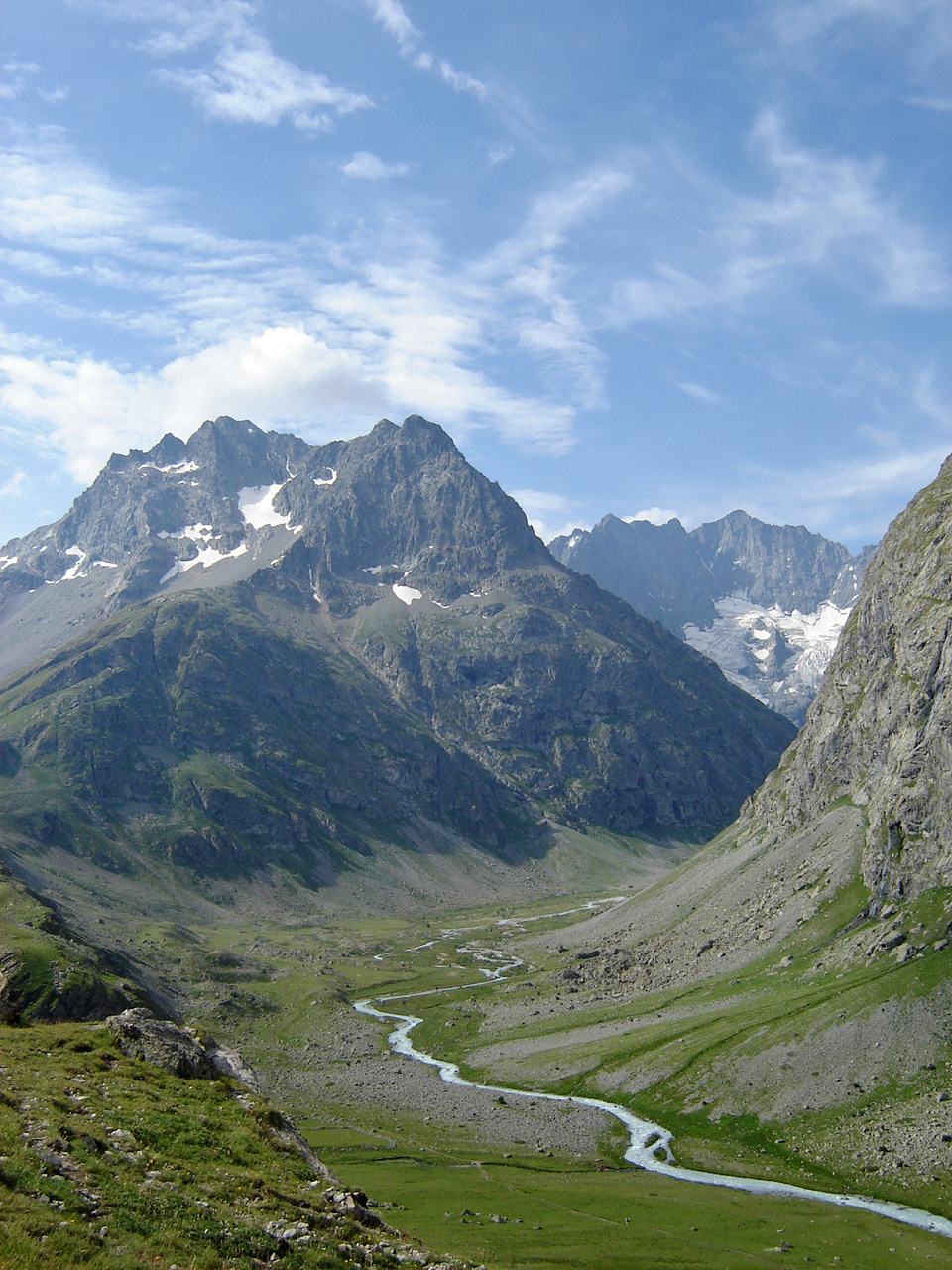
- The Romanche river in Écrins National Park

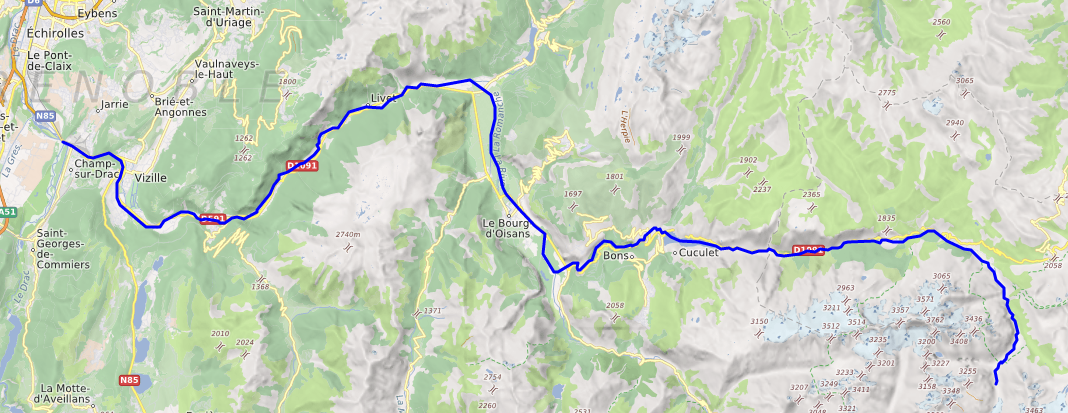

Location
- Country: France

Physical characteristics
- Source
  - location: Dauphiné Alps
  - coordinates: 44°58′26″N 6°21′58″E
  - elevation: 2,140 m (7,020 ft)
- Mouth
  - location: Drac
  - coordinates: 45°5′23″N 5°43′33″E
  - elevation: 260 m (850 ft)
- Length: 78.3 km (48.7 mi)
- Basin size: 1,221 km^{2} (471 sq mi)

Basin features
- Progression: Drac→ Isère→ Rhône→ Mediterranean Sea

The Romanche (French pronunciation: [ʁɔmɑ̃ʃ]) is a 78.3-kilometre (48.7 mi) mountain river in southeastern France. It is a right tributary of the Drac, itself a tributary of the Isère. Its drainage basin is 1,221 km^{2} (471 sq mi).

The Romanche begins in the northern part of the Massif des Écrins, Dauphiné Alps. It flows into the Drac in Champ-sur-Drac, south of Grenoble. The road from Grenoble to Briançon over the Col du Lautaret runs through its valley, which holds several mountain and ski resorts, including Alpe d'Huez, La Grave and Les Deux Alpes.

The Romanche flows through the Hautes-Alpes department in La Grave and the Isère in Mont-de-Lans, Le Bourg-d'Oisans, Livet-et-Gavet and Vizille.
