= Les Deux Alpes =

Ski resort in France

Les 2 Alpes
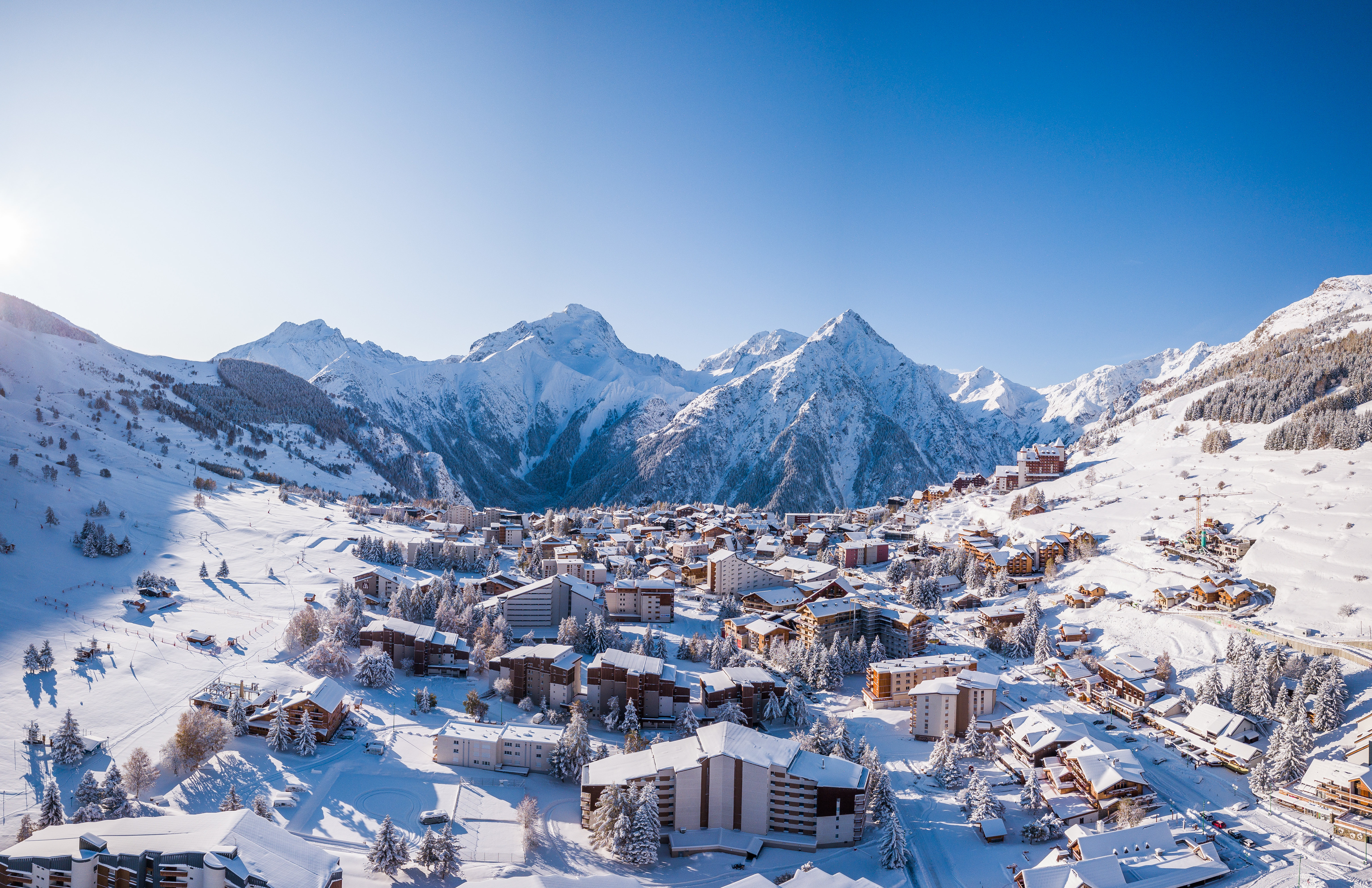

- Location within France Location within Auvergne-Rhône-Alpes Location within Alps
- Location: Isère, Auvergne-Rhône-Alpes, France
- Nearest city: Grenoble - 71 km (44 mi)
- Coordinates: 45°00′26″N 6°07′18″E
- Vertical: 2,268 m (7,441 ft)
- Top elevation: 3,568 m (11,706 ft)
- Base elevation: 1,300 m (4,265 ft)
- Skiable area: 4.3 km^{2} (1,063 acres) of marked pistes
- Trails: 96 total 17 (18%) beginner 45 (47%) easy 22 (23%) intermediate 12 (12%) difficult
- Lift system: 51 total: 2 funicular; 1 funitel; 2 cable cars; 2 gondolas; 23 chairlifts; 21 surface lifts
- Terrain parks: 1
- Snowmaking: 214 cannons
- Website: les2alpes.com

Les 2 Alpes (pronounced [le døz‿alp]) is a ski resort in the French department of Isère, Auvergne-Rhône-Alpes. The village sits at 1,650 m (5,413 ft) and lifts run to 3,568 m (11,706 ft). It has the largest skiable glacier in Europe and is France's second oldest ski resort behind Chamonix. It has the largest continuous on-piste skiable vertical drop in the world. It is a 71 km (44 mi) drive southeast of Grenoble. The famous off-piste resort La Grave is also reachable by foot from the top of the glacier.

== Resort ==
The "two Alpes" in the name do not refer to the two facing mountain-sides that comprise the resort, but rather to two adjacent areas of the original mountain pasture on the north-south plateau on which the resort was built. These pasture areas (or 'alps') are part of the two villages of Mont-de-Lans and Vénosc that lie in the deep valleys, respectively, to the north and south.

Access to the resort is by road RD 1091, in Livet-et-Gavet, as no road connects the resort to Vénosc down the steep slope to the south. However, a gondola connects the two, and there is a footpath available in summer.

== Winter ==
Les Deux Alpes offers approximately 220 km (137 mi) of pisted runs and 2,268 m (7,441 ft) of vertical drop. This means that the ski resort has the largest continuous on-piste skiable vertical drop globally, ahead of Zermatt's continuous on-piste winter skiable vertical drop of 2,263 m (7,425 ft), a figure which excludes the summer-only Gobba di Rollin lift. The Aiguille du Midi area has a greater vertical drop, but it is off-piste and non-continuous. It is possible to extend the vertical drop to around 2,668 m (8,753 ft) by skiing down a black and red bike trail to the village of Venosc and then taking the gondola back up to the main village, though this extension is off-piste and unofficial.

In terms of pistes, the resort has been termed "upside-down", as the lower slopes down to the resort are steeper and more challenging than the higher ski areas, including the wide and forgiving glacier runs. Less advanced skiers either take a gondola down to the resort or follow a lengthy, gentle but narrow track on the path of the access road. In the winter of 2015/16, a new run made an intermediate route to the village available, an effort involving the movement of over 550,000 cubic metres of earth. A wide area at the very bottom by the town is given over to nursery slopes. In total there are 100 marked runs spread across the resort; however, in addition, the resort and adjacent terrain is said to have as much off-piste as groomed piste areas.

Les Deux Alpes also contains one of the largest and most popular snowparks in Europe, with a halfpipe, multiple kickers, two boardercross courses and many grinding rails. The snowpark is re-modelled with new features added each season.

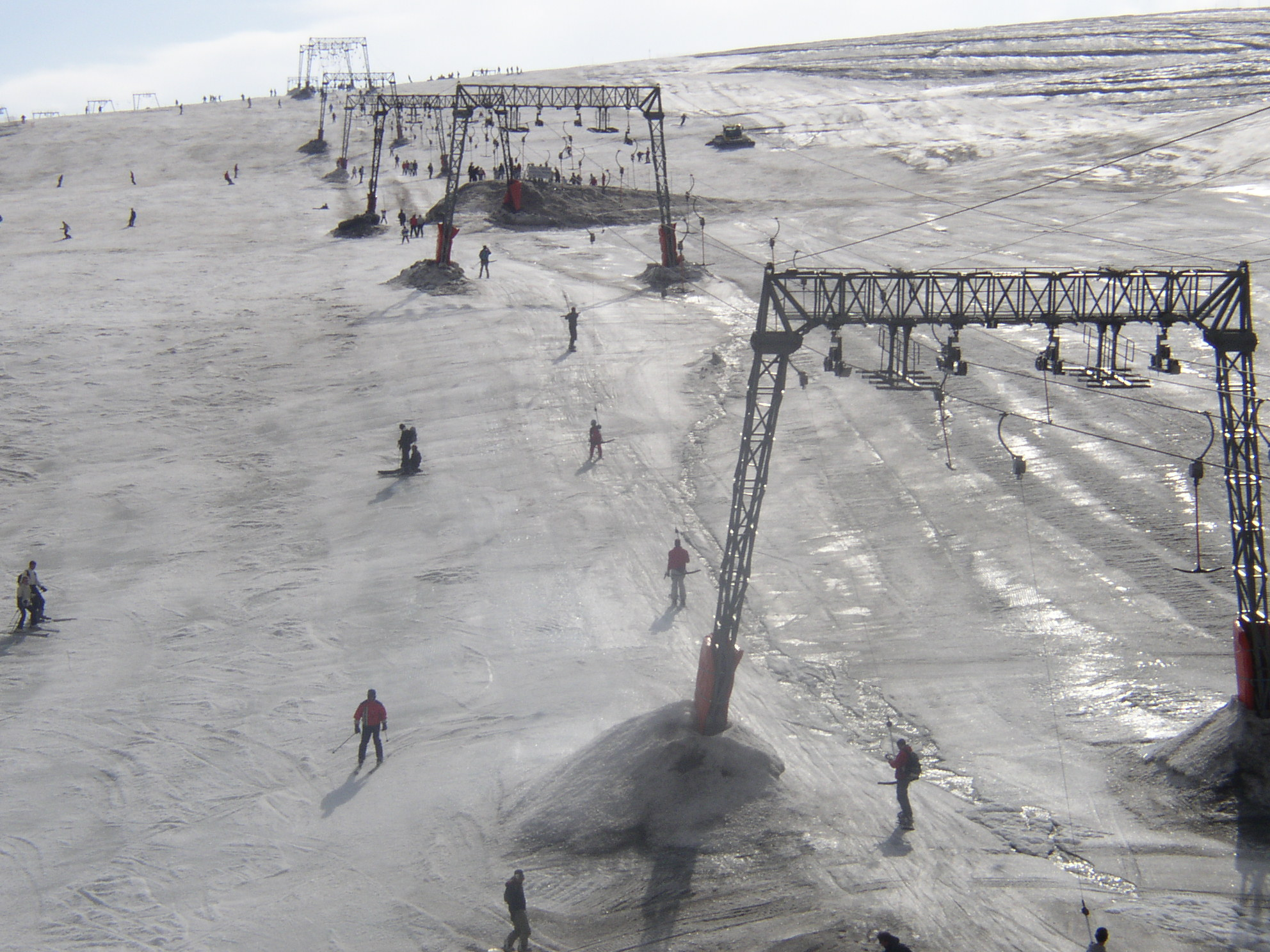
A view of the glacier's ski-lift system

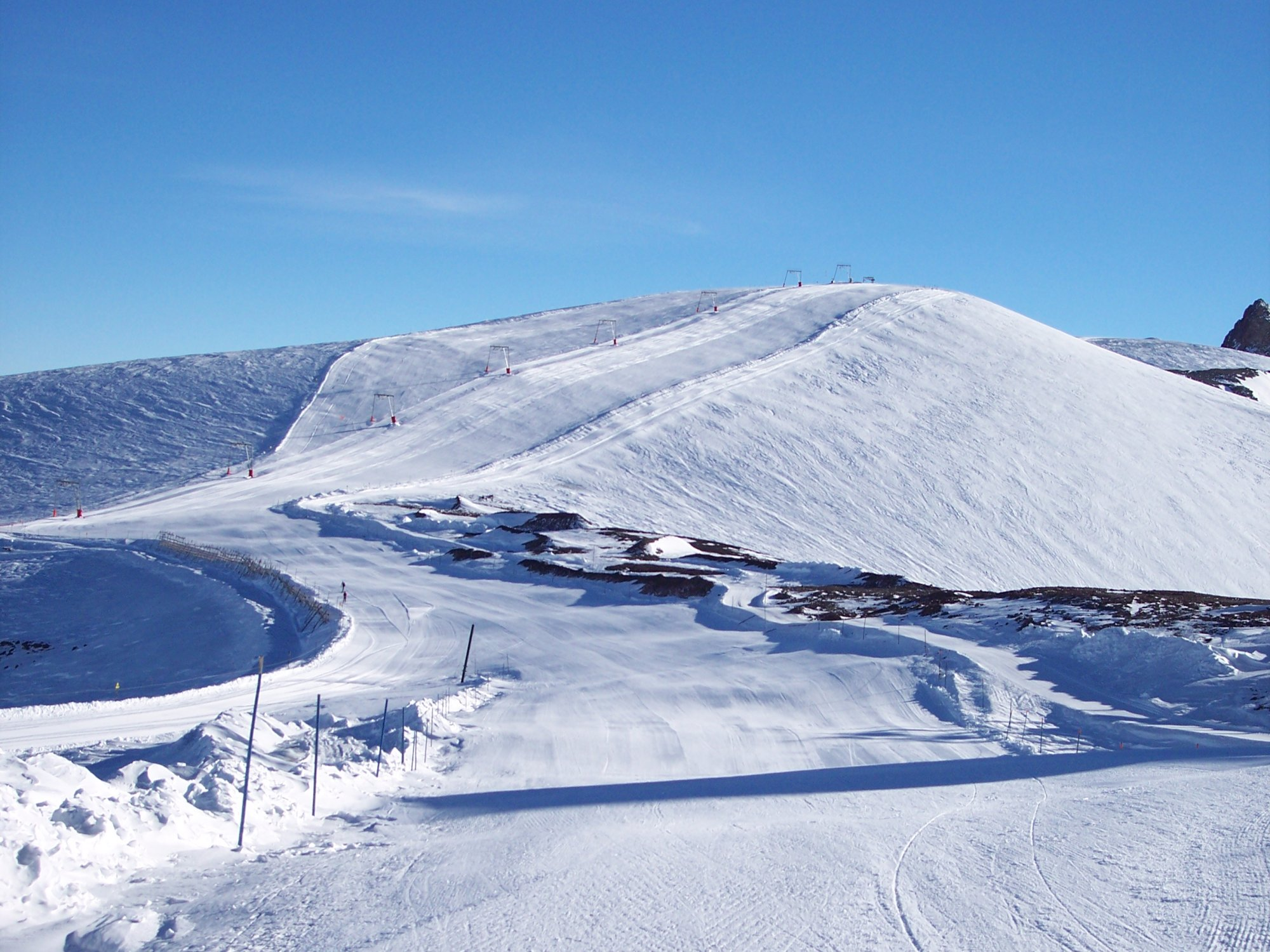
The Dôme de la Lauze

=== Lifts ===
The lift system has a combined up hill capacity of 66,000 people per hour. In total there are 59 lifts serving the resort. At peak times lift queues can be very long, and it can take over an hour to travel from the village to the top of the glacier, which is sometimes closed due to blizzards, high winds, avalanche risks, or a combination of both.

The resort of La Grave can be accessed from the very top lift at the Dome de la Lauze by either walking or at certain times by ski-tow behind a Snowcat. It is only recommended for advanced skiers under supervision of a qualified guide.

The Jandri 3S replaced the existing Jandri gondola from the beginning of the 2024/25, cutting the journey time from base to glacier down from 40 to 17 minutes and with double the uplift capacity to 3000 skiers per hour.

As part of the planned 350M Euro investment in Alpe d'Huez over the next 5 years, a new lift connecting the two resorts was planned for 2021. This would have created one of the biggest linked ski areas in the world, but was cancelled.

=== Ticketing ===
A part of the Grande Galaxie area of un-linked ski resorts including Alpe d'Huez, La Grave, Puy Saint Vincent and Vaujany which offer limited sharing of ski-passes. A six-day ski pass includes two days in Alpe d'Huez and one in Serre Chevalier. Ski passes in the resort can now be used hands free.

=== Glacier ===
The glacier enables year-round skiing (although the lifts are only open from mid-June to the end of August in Summer and December to end of April in Winter with some dates in October too). A funicular railway tunnelled under the ice transports skiers and, in summer, tourists to 3,450 m (11,319 ft), from where panoramic views can be seen of the surroundings, including Mont Blanc, some 100 km (62 mi) distant, L'Alpe d'Huez and the Plateau de Vercors above Grenoble.

== Summer ==
In summer, Les 2 Alpes becomes a popular venue for downhill and freeride mountain biking, with access to the glacier via the Jandri Express gondola lift, with a yearly event named "Mountain of Hell". This opens up a vertical mile of trails down to the resort and an even bigger drop to the Barrage du Chambon. Les 2 Alpes has featured in several Tour De France stages, most notably a Marco Pantani stage victory in 1998, from which he went on to win the Tour that year. Some mountain bikers take the 15 km unpaved road, which leads from Les Deux Alpes all the way up to the ski resort, thereby being the highest mountain road in the Alps. The altitude difference of 1550 m, several very steep passages, and the coarse gravel on the road make this a very demanding trip.

Les 2 Alpes also has the largest skiable glacier in Europe. Summer skiing in Les 2 Alpes takes place between 2,800 m (9,186 ft) and 3,568 m (11,706 ft) on the Girose and Mont de Lans glaciers above the resort. The 110 ha (272 acres) summer ski area is open between June and September.
