= Vénosc =

- Part of Les Deux Alpes
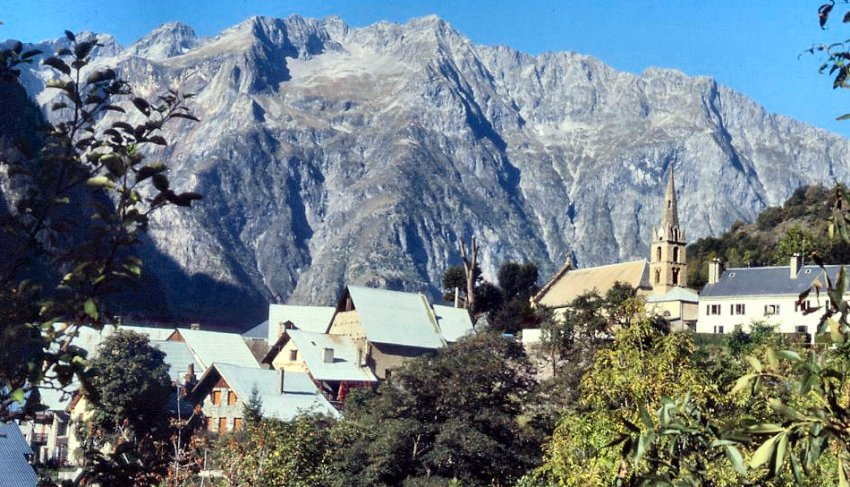
- Location of Vénosc
- Location within France Location within Auvergne-Rhône-Alpes
- Coordinates: 44°59′24″N 6°06′58″E
- Country: France
- Region: Auvergne-Rhône-Alpes
- Department: Isère
- Arrondissement: Grenoble
- Canton: Oisans-Romanche
- Commune: Les Deux Alpes
- Area^{1}: 25 km^{2} (9.7 sq mi)
- Elevation: 1,000 m (3,300 ft)
- Highest elevation: 3,465 m (11,368 ft)
- Lowest elevation: 816 m (2,677 ft)
- Population (2023): 819
  - Density: 33/km^{2} (85/sq mi)
- Time zone: UTC+01:00 (CET)
  - Summer (DST): UTC+02:00 (CEST)
- Postal code: 38143
- ^{1} French Land Register data, which excludes lakes, ponds, glaciers > 1 km^{2} (0.386 sq mi or 247 acres) and river estuaries.

Vénosc (French pronunciation: [venɔsk]) is a former commune in the Isère department in southeastern France. On 1 January 2017, it was merged into the new commune Les Deux Alpes.

== See also ==
- Communes of the Isère department
