= Detlef Kleuker =

German organ builder (1922–1988)

Detlef Kleuker (4 July 1922–15 February 1988) was a German organ builder who founded Detlev Kleuker Orgelbau.

== Biography ==
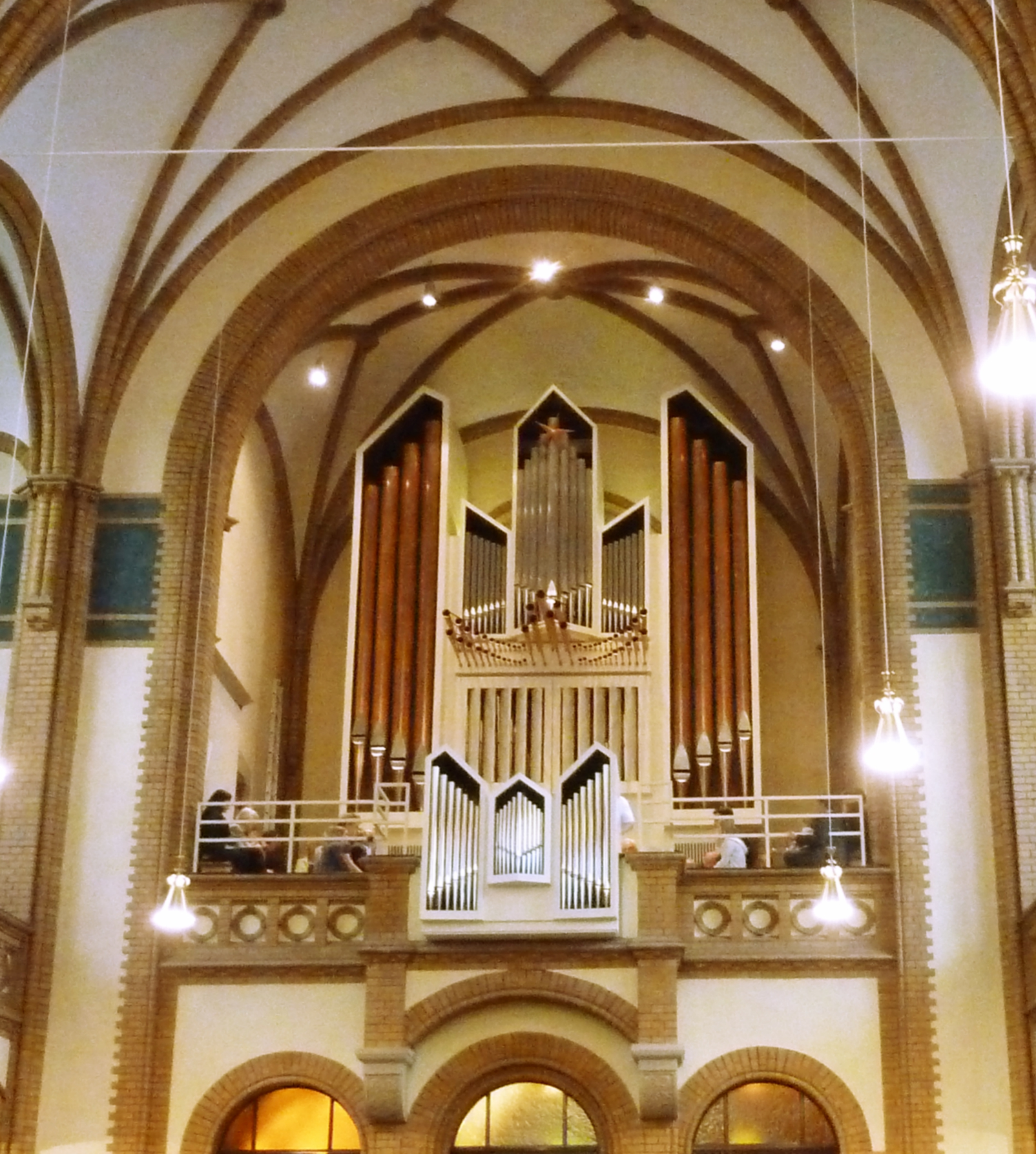
Kleuker organ, Christuskirche, Neuss

Born in Flensburg, Hans-Detlef Kleuker studied building organs at Emanuel Kemper in Lübeck. After his master certification in 1955, Kleuker established his own organ-building company in Brackwede. He built about 250 organs over the next three decades; in addition, restorations were carried out. Kleuker invented new methods in organ construction and incorporated the use of new materials. His organs tended to show a modern-edged appearance, while their dispositions remained more traditional.

In 1986 Siegfried Bäune took over the company. The company remained in existence until 1991/92.

Kleuker died in Brackwede, at the age of 66.

== See also ==
- Organ building
- Pipe organ
- List of pipe organ builders

== Literature ==
- Hermann Fischer (1991), 100 Jahre Bund deutscher Orgelbaumeister (in German), Lauffen: Orgelbau-Fachverlag, ISBN 3-921848-18-0
- Detlef Kleuker Orgelbau. Detlef Kleuker Orgelbau, Brackwede 1970 (Catalogue).

== See also ==
A partial list of organs built by Kleuker can be found on the corresponding German website Detlef Kleuker.
