= Mont-de-Lans =

- Part of Les Deux Alpes
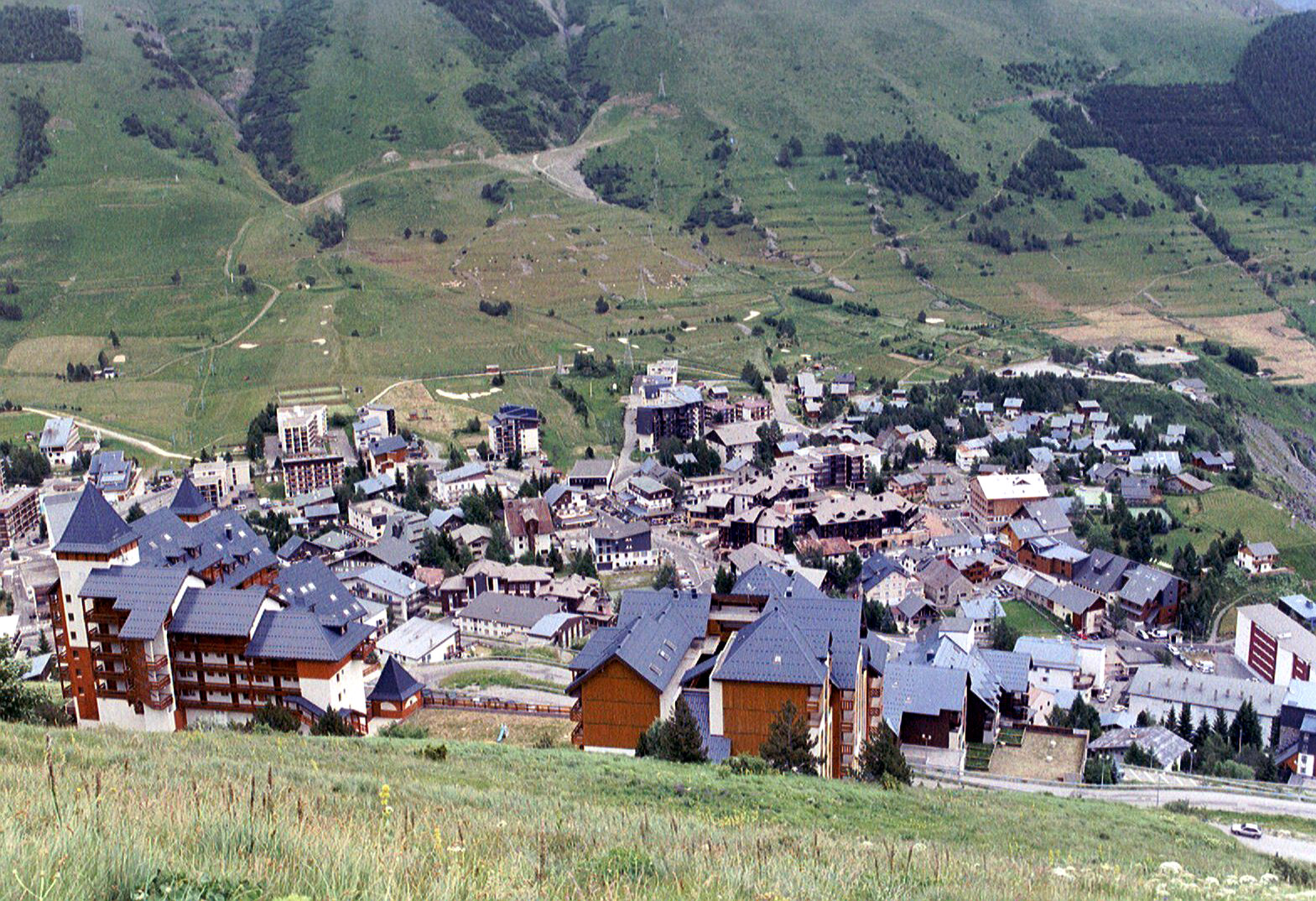
- Les Deux Alpes ski resort
- Location of Mont-de-Lans
- Location within France Location within Auvergne-Rhône-Alpes
- Coordinates: 45°02′12″N 6°07′53″E
- Country: France
- Region: Auvergne-Rhône-Alpes
- Department: Isère
- Arrondissement: Grenoble
- Canton: Oisans-Romanche
- Commune: Les Deux Alpes
- Area^{1}: 32 km^{2} (12 sq mi)
- Elevation: 1,280 m (4,200 ft)
- Highest elevation: 3,285 m (10,778 ft)
- Lowest elevation: 732 m (2,402 ft)
- Population (2022): 1,097
  - Density: 34/km^{2} (89/sq mi)
- Time zone: UTC+01:00 (CET)
  - Summer (DST): UTC+02:00 (CEST)
- Postal code: 38860
- ^{1} French Land Register data, which excludes lakes, ponds, glaciers > 1 km^{2} (0.386 sq mi or 247 acres) and river estuaries.

Mont-de-Lans (French pronunciation: [mɔ̃ də lɑ̃]) is a former commune in the Isère department in southeastern France. On 1 January 2017, it was merged into the new commune Les Deux Alpes.

== Population ==
Historical population

Year	Pop.	±% p.a.
1793	902	—
1821	1,254	+1.18%
1846	1,298	+0.14%
1872	1,058	−0.78%
1901	720	−1.32%
1926	409	−2.24%
1946	317	−1.27%
1962	282	−0.73%

Year	Pop.	±% p.a.
1968	327	+2.50%
1975	501	+6.28%
1982	946	+9.51%
1990	1,020	+0.95%
1999	1,101	+0.85%
2006	1,053	−0.63%
2022	1,097	+0.26%

Source: EHESS and INSEE

== See also ==
- Communes of the Isère department
