= Livet-et-Gavet =

- Commune
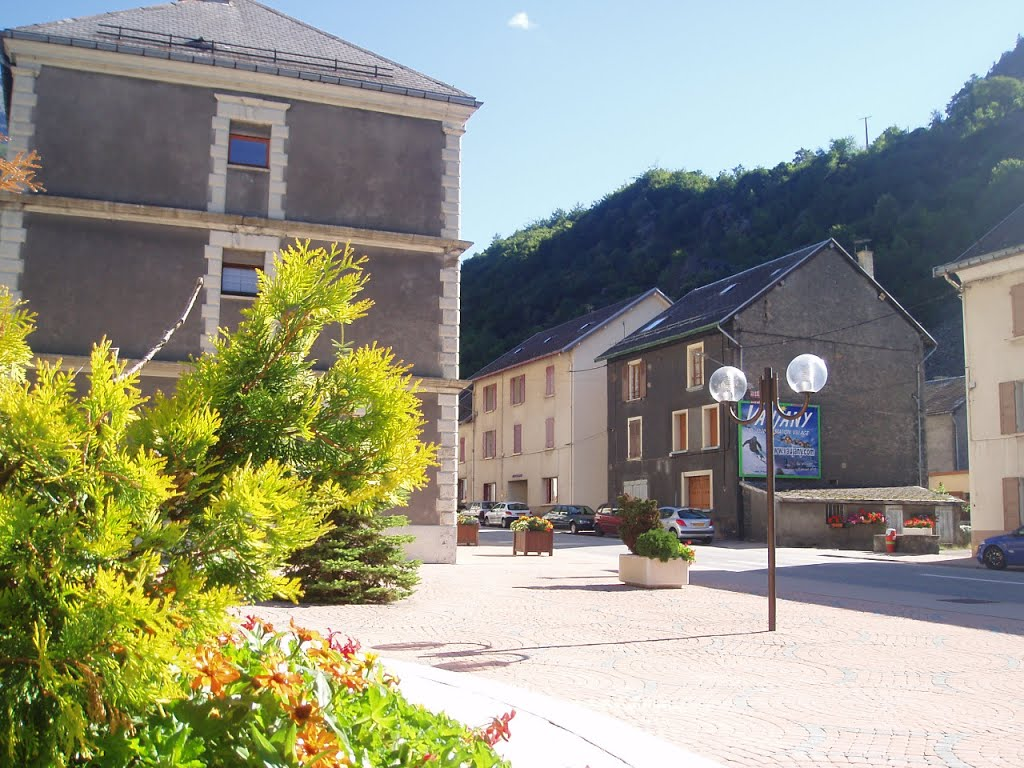
- Livet-et-Gavet
- Location of Livet-et-Gavet
- Location within France Location within Auvergne-Rhône-Alpes
- Coordinates: 45°05′31″N 5°54′11″E
- Country: France
- Region: Auvergne-Rhône-Alpes
- Department: Isère
- Arrondissement: Grenoble
- Canton: Oisans-Romanche
- Intercommunality: Oisans

Government
  - Mayor (2020–2026): Gilbert Dupont
- Area^{1}: 46.5 km^{2} (18.0 sq mi)
- Highest elevation: 2,763 m (9,065 ft)
- Lowest elevation: 366 m (1,201 ft)
- Population (2023): 1,253
  - Density: 26.9/km^{2} (69.8/sq mi)
- Time zone: UTC+01:00 (CET)
  - Summer (DST): UTC+02:00 (CEST)
- INSEE/Postal code: 38212 /38220
- ^{1} French Land Register data, which excludes lakes, ponds, glaciers > 1 km^{2} (0.386 sq mi or 247 acres) and river estuaries.

Livet-et-Gavet (French pronunciation: [livɛ e ɡavɛ]) is a commune in the Isère department in southeastern France.

== Population ==
Historical population
Year	Pop.	±% p.a.
1968	2,322	—
1975	2,123	−1.27%
1982	1,853	−1.92%
1990	1,447	−3.04%
1999	1,365	−0.65%
2007	1,346	−0.18%
2012	1,203	−2.22%
2017	1,315	+1.80%
2023	1,253	−0.80%
Source: INSEE

== Geography ==
Livet-et-Gavet is located in Oisans on the Romanche river, halfway between Grenoble and the winter sports resorts of The Alpe d'Huez and Les Deux Alpes (25km). The town is also midway between Vizille and Bourg d'Oisans (about 15km).

The Romanche valley and the town are located between the Belledonne and Taillefer mountain ranges, and are served by Provincial Road 1091 (RD 1091; previously RN91).

The Poursollet lake and village 1,649 meters above sea level, are part of Livet-et-Gavet and are the trailhead for many hikes in a sensitive natural environment.

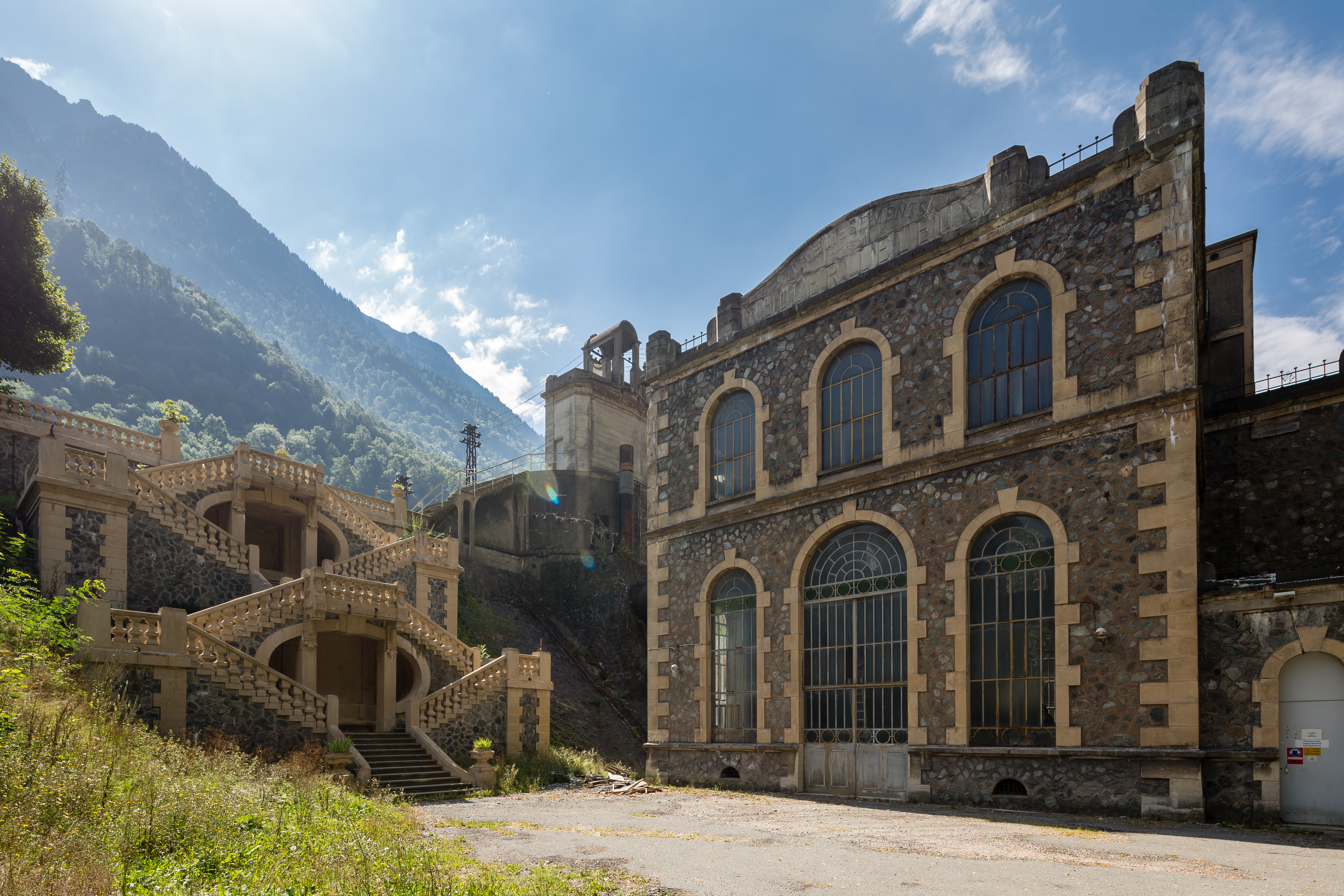
Centrale hydroélectrique des Vernes, Livet-et-Gavet, France-1

== Localities ==
The topography of the site has led to the formation of several hamlets: The Clavaux, The Saliniere, Les Clots, the Ponants, The Roberts, and The Poursollet.

The three main villages that make up the town of Livet-et-Gavet are: Livet, Rioupéroux, and Gavet.

== Economy ==
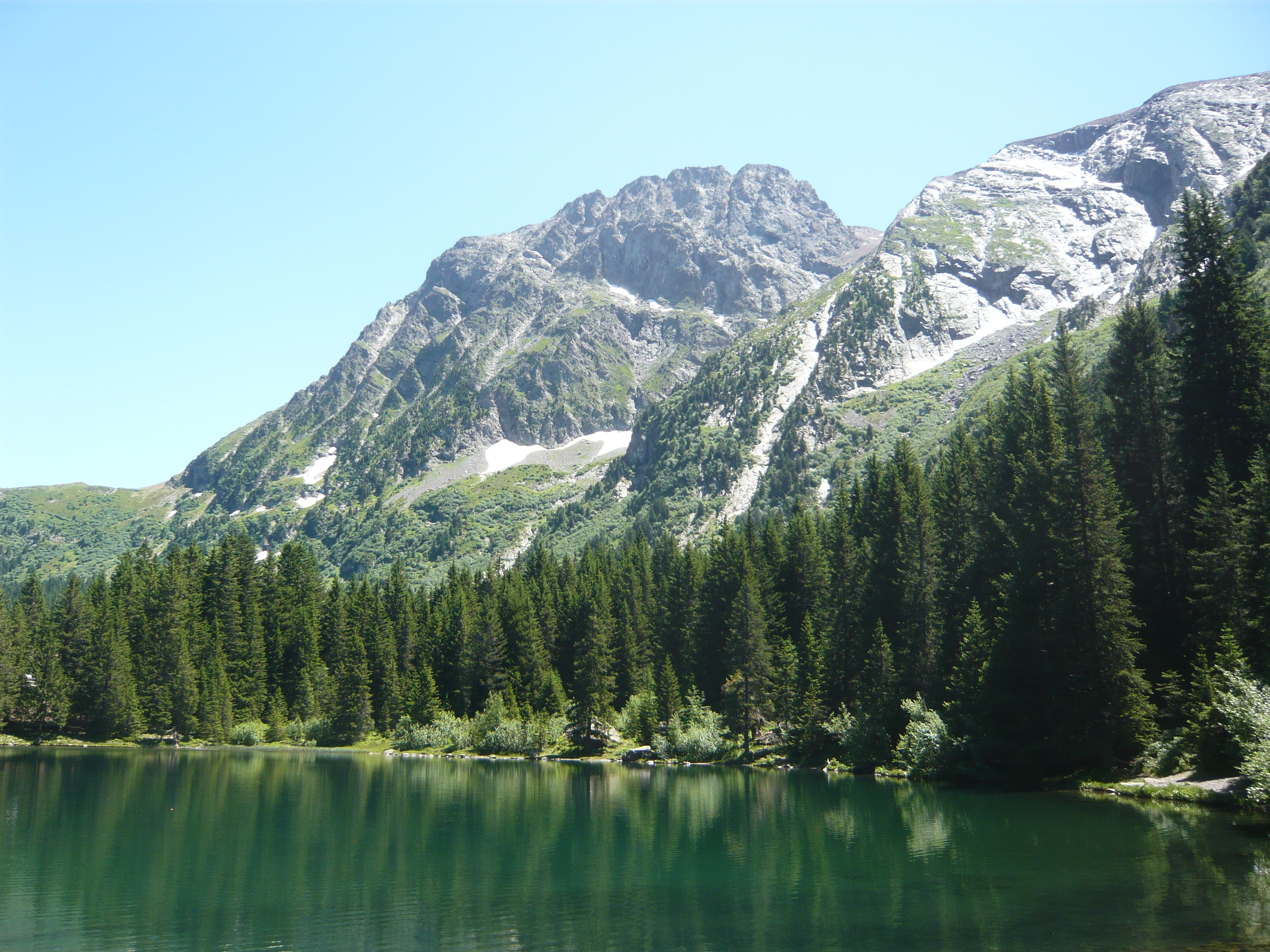
Lac.du.Poursollet.La.Morte.Taillefer.01

- Hydropower
- Metallurgy
- Eco tourism
- Industrial tourism

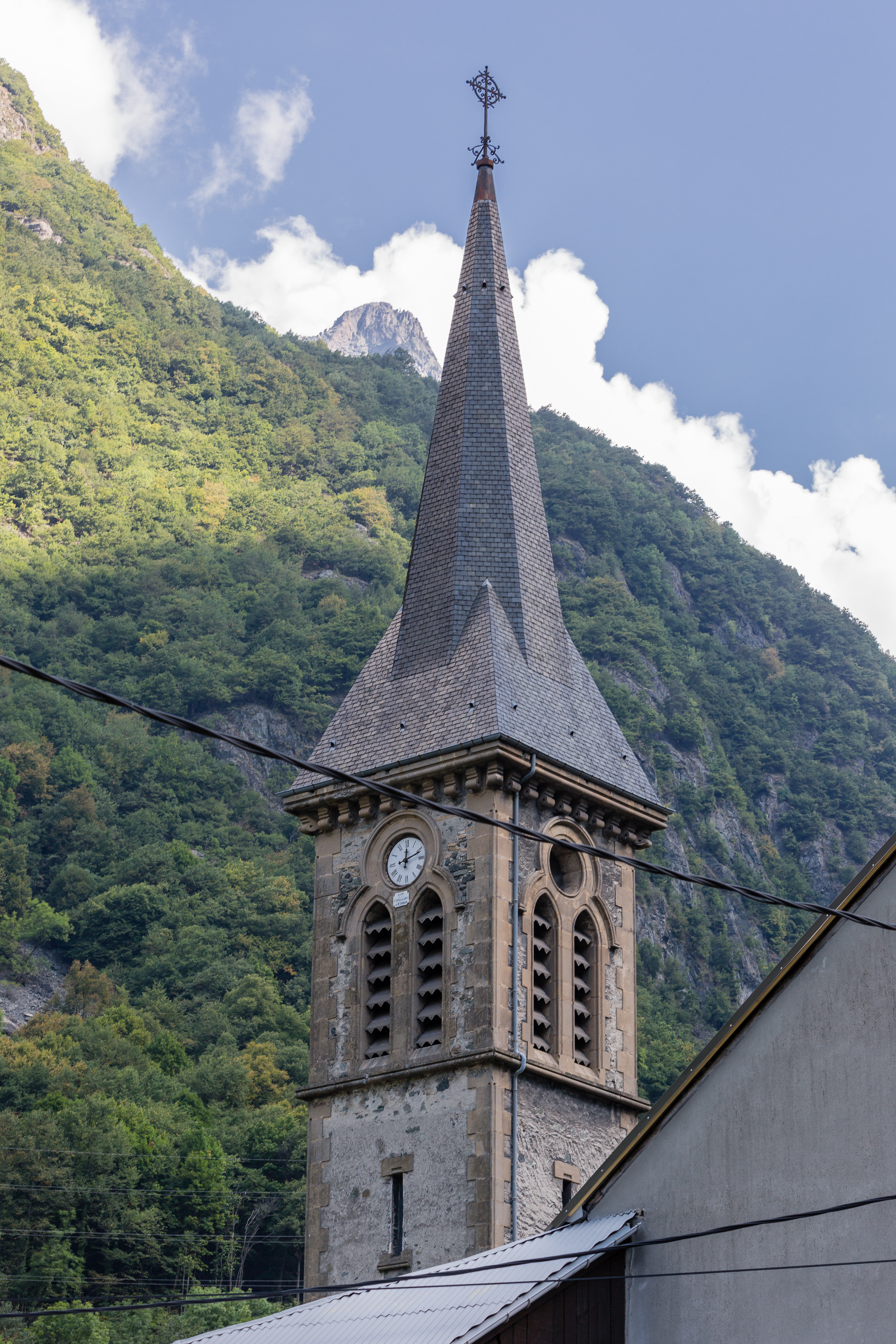
Clocher de l'église Saint-Antoine, Livet-et-Gavet, France

== Development ==
Livet-et-Gavet is inhabited since ancient times. The valley was an almost unavoidable path for Romans travelling between Italy and France. In the 20th century, numerous hydroelectric plants developed all over the Romanche, creating thousands of jobs in electricity-dependent factories, but also an entire industrial city with housing, railways, movies, schools, parks.

At the end of the industrial age, those factories closed one by one, leaving the remains near the Romanche. The railroad is gone, and the road has been widened, but the population has suffered a slow decline.

Since the 1980s, the town is trying to recuperate with the help of the state, the region and the department of Isère. A museum has been established to remember the history of the Romanche Valley. Deviations Gavet Livet and help avoid city centers and to give them some fresh air.

Factories, as Pechiney to Gavet become FerroPem have been able to diversify and modernize to compete with industry metallurgy. Hydroelectricity thrives with the completion of EDF project Romanche-Gavet housing are rebuilt. The town worked hard cleaning and floral.

To date, a vast project directed and financed by the French company EDF has been launched. After ten years of preparation, this significant project of around 250 million Euros will aim to completely replace the existing hydroelectric plants producing the Romanche Valley, allowing both to increase renewable electricity in Isère, but in addition to redraw the landscape of the Romanche valley. A modern underground 92 MW plant will be built in Gavet, connected by a 9.3km tunnel with a water dam outlet located upstream of Livet. This project is currently the largest in France in terms of hydro-electricity. An overview of the site is visible from the RD1091 (Alpine Road) bridge Inferent.

Eventually, the old power plants, non-recoverable, after more than a century of operation will be destroyed, and the riverbed will be redeveloped in order to develop tourism in the town of Livet-et-Gavet: paths, lake, bridge, landscape decoration etc. Discussions are underway to promote the heritage of the Valley so that these remains is a real asset in the future, an association, "Heritage for the Future", was created for this, and all ideas are welcome.

Today Livet-et-Gavet is undergoing economic transition and aims to become modernized by combining hydro-electric generation, natural biodiversity and ecotourism (hiking, fishing, biking, climbing, paragliding). Such issues are animated by the General Council of Isere, the town, the territory of the Oisans, or company EDF.

== Personalities linked to the commune ==
Charles Albert Keller: Founding of a real industrial empire in the Romanche valley, he knew how to use the force of water to power the Romanche many hydroelectric plants valley but also power for the first time in transportation of ' electricity the City of Grenoble...

== Trivia ==
The commune homed Charles Albert Keller.

Major film The Crimson Rivers was partly shot in the town, including the home of fr:Charles Albert Keller in impressive architectural part of the house, 4 storeys high and with a roof canted typical of the early 20th century, is built of stone (the inscription "Keller Establishments and Leleux" there still appears), while the second, reinforced concrete, is built on large piles in a dominant position over the Romansh: there was the office of Charles Albert Keller, from which he could observe all of its workshops and factories located on both sides of the river.
