= List of teams and cyclists in the 2013 Tour de France =

The number of riders per nation participated in the 2013 Tour de France: 20+ / 10–19 / 2–9 / 1

The 2013 Tour de France was the 100th edition of the race, one of cycling's Grand Tours. It started on the island of Corsica on 30 June and finished on the Champs-Élysées in Paris on 21 July. The Tour consisted of twenty-one race stages and covered a total distance of 3,403.5 km (2,115 mi).

Twenty-two teams participated in the 2013 edition of the Tour de France. All of the nineteen UCI ProTeams were entitled, and obliged, to enter the race. On 27 April 2013, the organiser of the Tour, Amaury Sport Organisation (ASO), announced the three second-tier UCI Professional Continental teams given wildcard invitations, all of which were French-based. The presentation of the teams took place at the harbour of Porto-Vecchio on 28 June, two days before the start of opening stage held in the town. Each team arrived by boat to the stage, before being introduced to the crowd.

Each squad was allowed a maximum of nine riders, therefore the start list contained a total of 198 riders. Of these, 54 were riding the Tour de France for the first time. From the riders that began this edition, 169 completed the race. The average age of all the riders was 29.45, with 19-year-old Danny van Poppel (Vacansoleil–DCM) the youngest rider and 41-year-old Jens Voigt (RadioShack–Leopard) the oldest. Of the total average ages, Cannondale was the youngest team and Saxo–Tinkoff the oldest. The riders came from 34 countries; France, Spain, Italy, Netherlands, Australia, Belgium and Germany all had 10 or more riders in the race. Riders from ten countries won at least one stage; German riders won the largest number of stages, a total of six.

Marcel Kittel (Argos–Shimano) was the first rider to wear the general classification's yellow jersey after winning stage one. He lost it after the next stage to Jan Bakelants of RadioShack–Leopard, who managed to obtain a one-second lead from a late solo attack. Simon Gerrans gained the race lead after his team, Orica–GreenEDGE, won the stage four team time trial. Gerrans passed the lead on to teammate Daryl Impey after the fifth stage. Chris Froome of Team Sky took the lead from Impey after the eighth stage, the first classified as mountainous. Froome maintained his lead for the remainder of the race by consolidating his lead through solid performances in the individual time trials and in the high mountains. Second and third respectively were Nairo Quintana (Movistar Team) and Joaquim Rodríguez (Team Katusha). In the race's other classifications, Quintana won the mountains classification and also finished as the best young rider in the general classification, finishing in second place overall; Peter Sagan of the Cannondale team was the winner of the points classification, with Saxo–Tinkoff finishing as the winners of the team classification. Christophe Riblon Ag2r–La Mondiale was given the award for the most combative rider.

== Teams ==
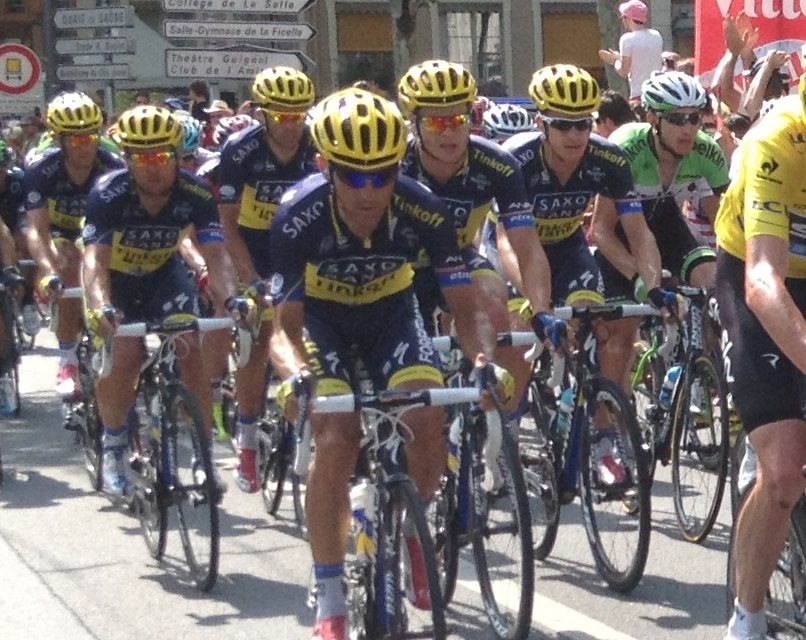
The team classification winners Saxo–Tinkoff riding in the peloton on stage fourteen.

ProTeams

- Team Sky (riders)
- Cannondale (riders)
- Lotto–Belisol (riders)
- BMC Racing Team (riders)
- RadioShack–Leopard (riders)
- Astana (riders)
- FDJ.fr (riders)
- Ag2r–La Mondiale (riders)
- Saxo–Tinkoff (riders)
- Team Katusha (riders)
- Euskaltel–Euskadi (riders)
- Movistar Team (riders)
- Lampre–Merida (riders)
- Omega Pharma–Quick-Step (riders)
- Belkin Pro Cycling (riders)
- Garmin–Sharp (riders)
- Orica–GreenEDGE (riders)
- Argos–Shimano (riders)
- Vacansoleil–DCM (riders)

Professional Continental teams

- Team Europcar (riders)
- Cofidis (riders)
- Sojasun (riders)

== Cyclists ==
Legend
No.	Starting number worn by the rider during the Tour
Pos.	Position in the general classification
Time	Deficit to the winner of the general classification
‡	Denotes riders born on or after 1 January 1988 eligible for the young rider classification
A yellow jersey.	Denotes the winner of the general classification
A green jersey.	Denotes the winner of the points classification
A white jersey with red polka dots.	Denotes the winner of the mountains classification
A white jersey.	Denotes the winner of the young rider classification (eligibility indicated by ‡)
A white jersey with a yellow number bib.	Denotes riders that represent the winner of the team classification
A white jersey with a red number bib.	Denotes the winner of the super-combativity award
DNS	Denotes a rider who did not start a stage, followed by the stage before which he withdrew
DNF	Denotes a rider who did not finish a stage, followed by the stage in which he withdrew
HD	Denotes a rider who finished outside the time limit, followed by the stage in which he did so (French: Hors delai)
Age correct as of 30 June 2013, the date on which the Tour began

=== By starting number ===
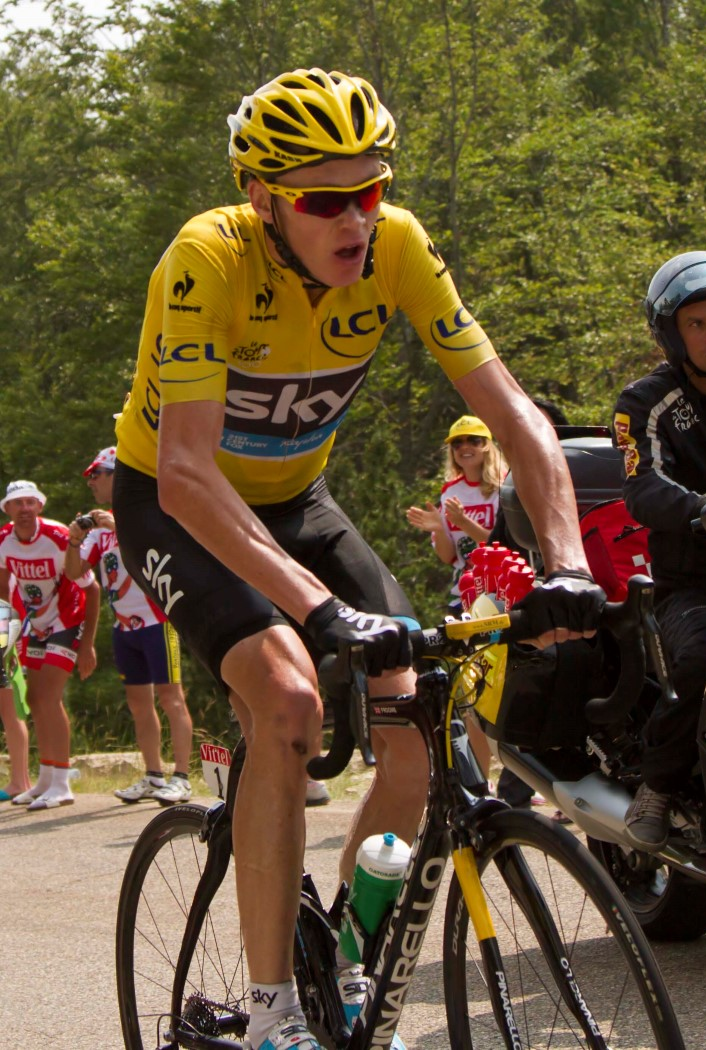
Team Sky rider Chris Froome won the general classification.

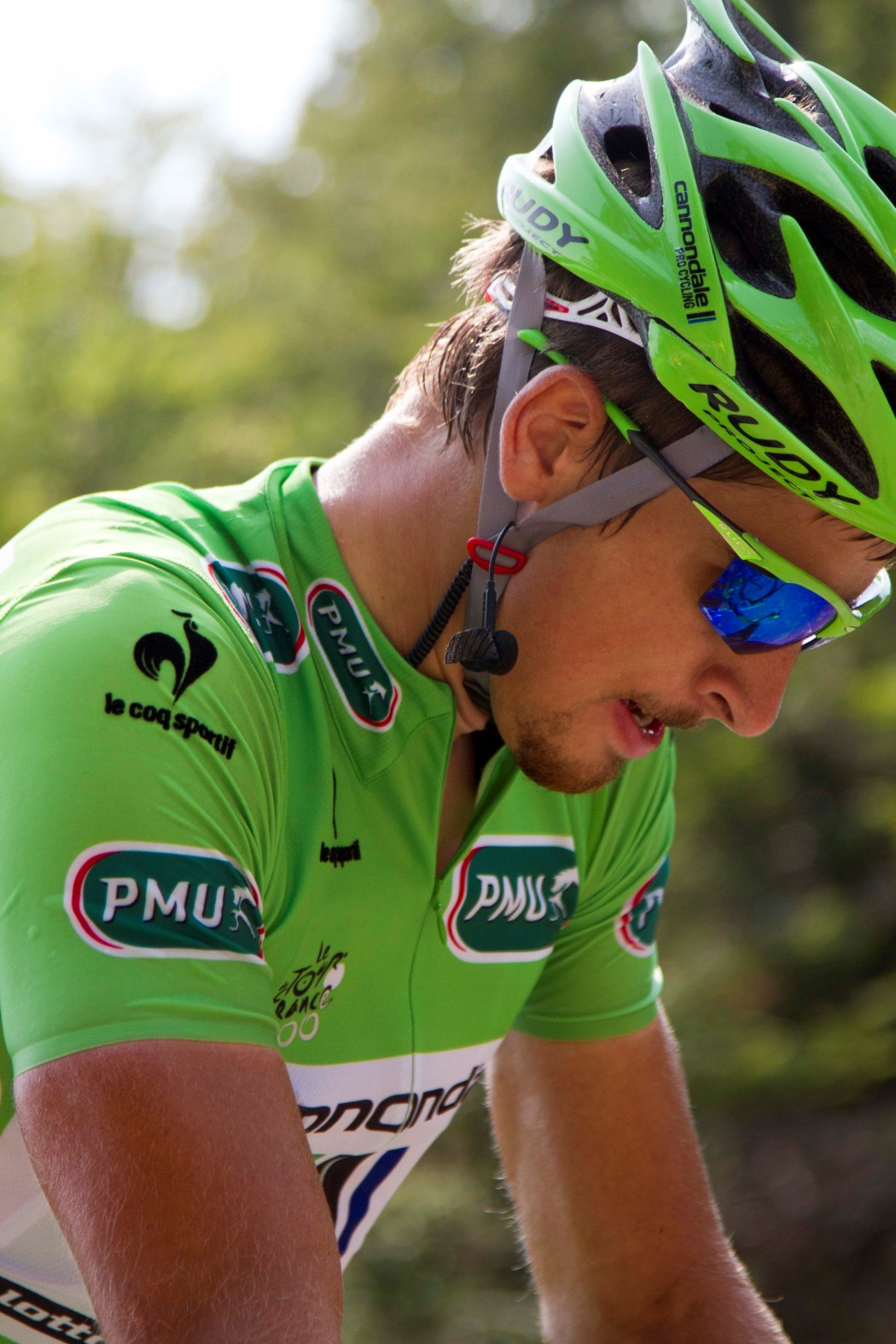
Cannondale rider Peter Sagan won the points classification.

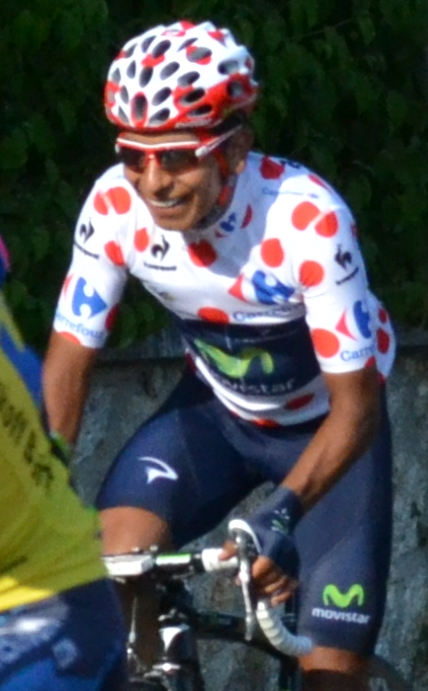
Movistar Team rider Nairo Quintana won the mountains classification and young rider classification.

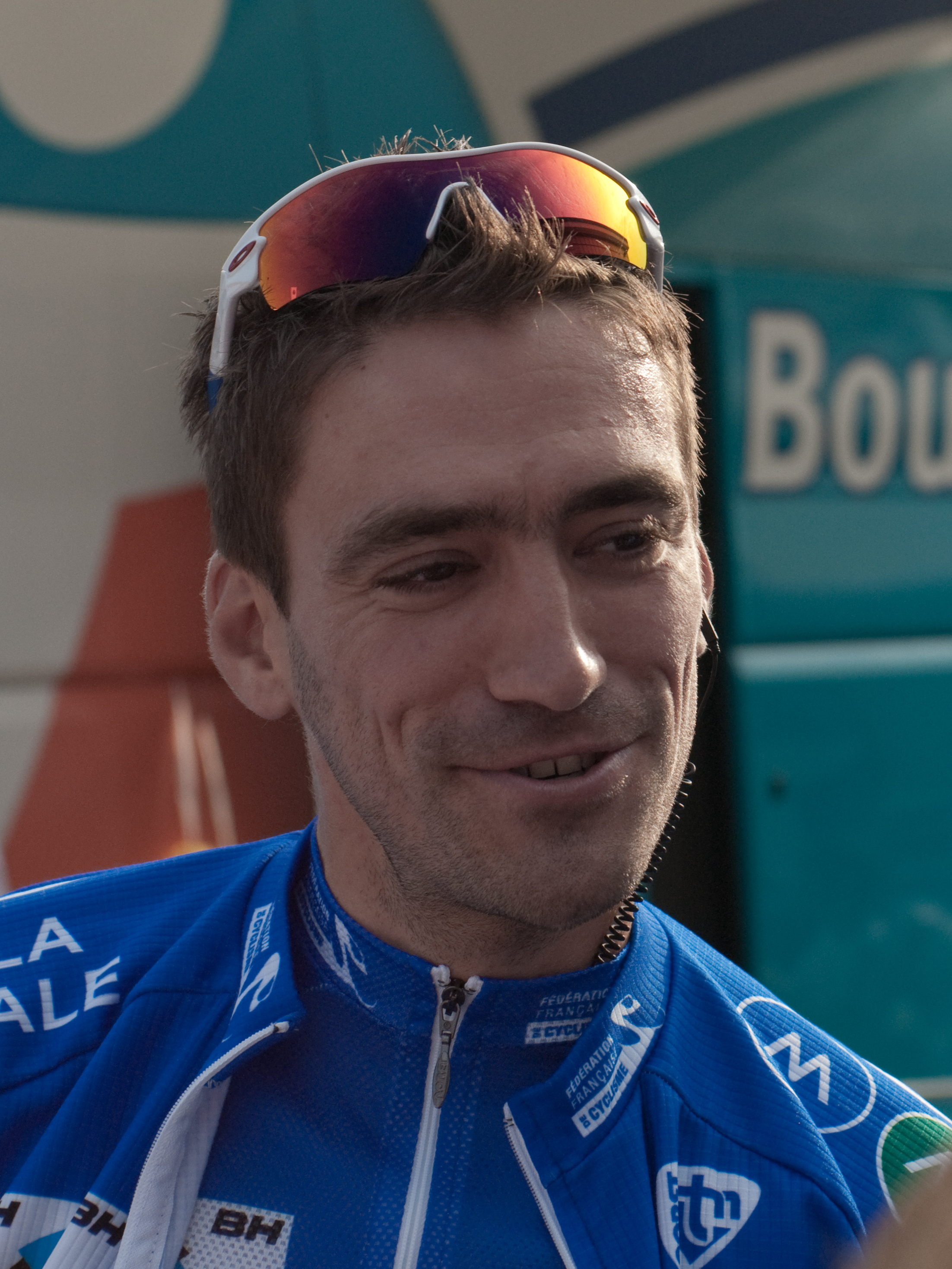
Ag2r–La Mondiale rider Christophe Riblon (pictured in 2009) won the super-combativity award.

No.	Rider	Nationality	Team	Age	Pos.	Time	Ref
1	Chris Froome	Great Britain	Team Sky	28	1	83h 56' 40"	
2	Edvald Boasson Hagen	Norway	Team Sky	26	DNS-13	—	
3	Peter Kennaugh ‡	Great Britain	Team Sky	24	77	+ 2h 33' 46"	
4	Vasil Kiryienka	Belarus	Team Sky	32	HD-9	—	
5	David López	Spain	Team Sky	32	127	+ 3h 28' 47"	
6	Richie Porte	Australia	Team Sky	28	19	+ 39' 41"	
7	Kanstantsin Sivtsov	Belarus	Team Sky	30	90	+ 2h 44' 43"	
8	Ian Stannard	Great Britain	Team Sky	26	135	+ 3h 38' 49"	
9	Geraint Thomas	Great Britain	Team Sky	27	140	+ 3h 43' 34"	
11	Peter Sagan ‡	Slovakia	Cannondale	23	82	+ 2h 38' 51"	
12	Maciej Bodnar	Poland	Cannondale	28	114	+ 3h 15' 15"	
13	Alessandro De Marchi	Italy	Cannondale	27	71	+ 2h 23' 11"	
14	Ted King	United States	Cannondale	30	HD-4	—	
15	Kristijan Koren	Slovenia	Cannondale	26	100	+ 2h 57' 03"	
16	Alan Marangoni	Italy	Cannondale	28	111	+ 3h 10' 01"	
17	Moreno Moser ‡	Italy	Cannondale	22	94	+ 2h 53' 27"	
18	Fabio Sabatini	Italy	Cannondale	28	117	+ 3h 18' 40"	
19	Brian Vandborg	Denmark	Cannondale	31	155	+ 4h 00' 21"	
21	Jurgen Van den Broeck	Belgium	Lotto–Belisol	30	DNS-6	—	
22	Lars Bak	Denmark	Lotto–Belisol	33	108	+ 3h 07' 12"	
23	Bart De Clercq	Belgium	Lotto–Belisol	26	38	+ 1h 28' 06"	
24	André Greipel	Germany	Lotto–Belisol	30	129	+ 3h 32' 07"	
25	Adam Hansen	Australia	Lotto–Belisol	32	72	+ 2h 23' 15"	
26	Greg Henderson	New Zealand	Lotto–Belisol	36	162	+ 4h 04' 26"	
27	Jürgen Roelandts	Belgium	Lotto–Belisol	27	160	+ 4h 03' 18"	
28	Marcel Sieberg	Germany	Lotto–Belisol	31	DNF-19	—	
29	Frederik Willems	Belgium	Lotto–Belisol	33	163	+ 4h 05' 18"	
31	Cadel Evans	Australia	BMC Racing Team	36	39	+ 1h 30' 14"	
32	Brent Bookwalter	United States	BMC Racing Team	29	91	+ 2h 45' 05"	
33	Marcus Burghardt	Germany	BMC Racing Team	30	98	+ 2h 54' 01"	
34	Philippe Gilbert	Belgium	BMC Racing Team	30	62	+ 2h 07' 11"	
35	Amaël Moinard	France	BMC Racing Team	31	56	+ 2h 00' 03"	
36	Steve Morabito	Switzerland	BMC Racing Team	30	35	+ 1h 20' 39"	
37	Manuel Quinziato	Italy	BMC Racing Team	33	85	+ 2h 39' 34"	
38	Michael Schär	Switzerland	BMC Racing Team	26	DNS-9	—	
39	Tejay van Garderen ‡	United States	BMC Racing Team	24	45	+ 1h 38' 57"	
41	Andy Schleck	Luxembourg	RadioShack–Leopard	28	20	+ 41' 46"	
42	Jan Bakelants	Belgium	RadioShack–Leopard	27	18	+ 35' 51"	
43	Laurent Didier	Luxembourg	RadioShack–Leopard	28	53	+ 1h 58' 53"	
44	Tony Gallopin ‡	France	RadioShack–Leopard	25	58	+ 2h 02' 59"	
45	Markel Irizar	Spain	RadioShack–Leopard	33	103	+ 2h 59' 39"	
46	Andreas Klöden	Germany	RadioShack–Leopard	38	30	+ 1h 02' 43"	
47	Maxime Monfort	Belgium	RadioShack–Leopard	30	14	+ 23' 38"	
48	Jens Voigt	Germany	RadioShack–Leopard	41	67	+ 2h 15' 09"	
49	Haimar Zubeldia	Spain	RadioShack–Leopard	36	36	+ 1h 24' 22"	
51	Pierre Rolland	France	Team Europcar	26	24	+ 52' 15"	
52	Yukiya Arashiro	Japan	Team Europcar	28	99	+ 2h 54' 53"	
53	Jérôme Cousin ‡	France	Team Europcar	24	156	+ 4h 01' 10"	
54	Cyril Gautier	France	Team Europcar	25	32	+ 1h 12' 42"	
55	Yohann Gène	France	Team Europcar	32	158	+ 4h 03' 06"	
56	Davide Malacarne	Italy	Team Europcar	25	49	+ 1h 44' 50"	
57	Kévin Reza ‡	France	Team Europcar	25	134	+ 3h 38' 31"	
58	David Veilleux	Canada	Team Europcar	25	123	+ 3h 24' 16"	
59	Thomas Voeckler	France	Team Europcar	37	65	+ 2h 12' 48"	
61	Janez Brajkovič	Slovenia	Astana	29	DNS-7	—	
62	Assan Bazayev	Kazakhstan	Astana	32	168	+ 4h 24' 52"	
63	Jakob Fuglsang	Denmark	Astana	28	7	+ 12' 17"	
64	Enrico Gasparotto	Italy	Astana	30	95	+ 2h 53' 36"	
65	Francesco Gavazzi	Italy	Astana	28	84	+ 2h 39' 08"	
66	Andrey Kashechkin	Kazakhstan	Astana	33	DNF-3	—	
67	Fredrik Kessiakoff	Sweden	Astana	33	DNF-6	—	
68	Alexey Lutsenko ‡	Kazakhstan	Astana	20	DNF-18	—	
69	Dimitry Muravyev	Kazakhstan	Astana	33	167	+ 4h 21' 46"	
71	Thibaut Pinot ‡	France	FDJ.fr	23	DNS-16	—	
72	William Bonnet	France	FDJ.fr	31	DNF-18	—	
73	Nacer Bouhanni ‡	France	FDJ.fr	22	DNF-6	—	
74	Pierrick Fédrigo	France	FDJ.fr	34	59	+ 2h 04' 19"	
75	Murilo Fischer	Brazil	FDJ.fr	34	133	+ 3h 37' 48"	
76	Alexandre Geniez ‡	France	FDJ.fr	25	44	+ 1h 38' 06"	
77	Arnold Jeannesson	France	FDJ.fr	27	29	+ 57' 06"	
78	Jérémy Roy	France	FDJ.fr	30	126	+ 3h 28' 39"	
79	Arthur Vichot ‡	France	FDJ.fr	24	66	+ 2h 15' 06"	
81	Jean-Christophe Péraud	France	Ag2r–La Mondiale	36	DNF-17	—	
82	Romain Bardet ‡	France	Ag2r–La Mondiale	22	15	+ 26' 42"	
83	Maxime Bouet	France	Ag2r–La Mondiale	26	DNS-6	—	
84	Samuel Dumoulin	France	Ag2r–La Mondiale	32	143	+ 3h 47' 11"	
85	Hubert Dupont	France	Ag2r–La Mondiale	32	34	+ 1h 14' 59"	
86	John Gadret	France	Ag2r–La Mondiale	34	22	+ 46' 00"	
87	Blel Kadri	France	Ag2r–La Mondiale	26	125	+ 3h 27' 17"	
88	Sébastien Minard	France	Ag2r–La Mondiale	31	124	+ 3h 24' 28"	
89	Christophe Riblon	France	Ag2r–La Mondiale	32	37	+ 1h 27' 57"	
91	Alberto Contador	Spain	Saxo–Tinkoff	30	4	+ 6' 27"	
92	Daniele Bennati	Italy	Saxo–Tinkoff	32	107	+ 3h 05' 55"	
93	Jesús Hernández	Spain	Saxo–Tinkoff	31	43	+ 1h 36' 40"	
94	Roman Kreuziger	Czech Republic	Saxo–Tinkoff	27	5	+ 7' 27"	
95	Benjamín Noval	Spain	Saxo–Tinkoff	33	DNF-9	—	
96	Sérgio Paulinho	Portugal	Saxo–Tinkoff	33	136	+ 3h 38' 58"	
97	Nicolas Roche	Ireland	Saxo–Tinkoff	28	40	+ 1h 34' 17"	
98	Michael Rogers	Australia	Saxo–Tinkoff	33	16	+ 26' 51"	
99	Matteo Tosatto	Italy	Saxo–Tinkoff	39	92	+ 2h 47' 39"	
101	Joaquim Rodríguez	Spain	Team Katusha	34	3	+ 5' 04"	
102	Pavel Brutt	Russia	Team Katusha	31	110	+ 3h 09' 47"	
103	Alexander Kristoff	Norway	Team Katusha	25	147	+ 3h 49' 50"	
104	Aleksandr Kuschynski	Belarus	Team Katusha	33	141	+ 3h 45' 02"	
105	Alberto Losada	Spain	Team Katusha	31	109	+ 3h 07' 26"	
106	Daniel Moreno	Spain	Team Katusha	31	17	+ 32' 34"	
107	Gatis Smukulis	Latvia	Team Katusha	26	119	+ 3h 21' 06"	
108	Yuri Trofimov	Russia	Team Katusha	29	51	+ 1h 49' 54"	
109	Eduard Vorganov	Russia	Team Katusha	30	48	+ 1h 42' 41"	
111	Igor Antón	Spain	Euskaltel–Euskadi	30	23	+ 48' 07"	
112	Mikel Astarloza	Spain	Euskaltel–Euskadi	33	42	+ 1h 36' 27"	
113	Gorka Izagirre	Spain	Euskaltel–Euskadi	25	DNS-17	—	
114	Jon Izagirre ‡	Spain	Euskaltel–Euskadi	24	69	+ 2h 21' 32"	
115	Juan José Lobato ‡	Spain	Euskaltel–Euskadi	24	165	+ 4h 07' 59"	
116	Mikel Nieve	Spain	Euskaltel–Euskadi	29	12	+ 20' 01"	
117	Juan José Oroz	Spain	Euskaltel–Euskadi	32	78	+ 2h 33' 55"	
118	Rubén Pérez	Spain	Euskaltel–Euskadi	31	139	+ 3h 43' 15"	
119	Romain Sicard ‡	France	Euskaltel–Euskadi	25	122	+ 3h 23' 54"	
121	Alejandro Valverde	Spain	Movistar Team	33	8	+ 15' 26"	
122	Andrey Amador	Costa Rica	Movistar Team	26	54	+ 1h 58' 59"	
123	Jonathan Castroviejo	Spain	Movistar Team	26	97	+ 2h 53' 41"	
124	Rui Costa	Portugal	Movistar Team	26	27	+ 54' 34"	
125	Imanol Erviti	Spain	Movistar Team	29	118	+ 3h 19' 12"	
126	Iván Gutiérrez	Spain	Movistar Team	34	DNF-9	—	
127	Rubén Plaza	Spain	Movistar Team	33	47	+ 1h 40' 35"	
128	Nairo Quintana ‡	Colombia	Movistar Team	23	2	+ 4' 20"	
129	José Joaquín Rojas	Spain	Movistar Team	28	79	+ 2h 34' 05"	
131	Rein Taaramäe	Estonia	Cofidis	26	102	+ 2h 59' 09"	
132	Yoann Bagot	France	Cofidis	25	DNF-3	—	
133	Jérôme Coppel	France	Cofidis	26	63	+ 2h 09' 13"	
134	Egoitz García	Spain	Cofidis	27	115	+ 3h 16' 28"	
135	Christophe Le Mével	France	Cofidis	32	DNF-19	—	
136	Guillaume Levarlet	France	Cofidis	27	61	+ 2h 07' 01"	
137	Luis Ángel Maté	Spain	Cofidis	29	88	+ 2h 43' 28"	
138	Rudy Molard ‡	France	Cofidis	23	73	+ 2h 25' 25"	
139	Daniel Navarro	Spain	Cofidis	29	9	+ 15' 52"	
141	Damiano Cunego	Italy	Lampre–Merida	31	55	+ 1h 59' 38"	
142	Matteo Bono	Italy	Lampre–Merida	30	DNF-8	—	
143	Davide Cimolai ‡	Italy	Lampre–Merida	23	137	+ 3h 40' 31"	
144	Elia Favilli ‡	Italy	Lampre–Merida	24	128	+ 3h 31' 19"	
145	Roberto Ferrari	Italy	Lampre–Merida	30	157	+ 4h 02' 09"	
146	Adriano Malori ‡	Italy	Lampre–Merida	25	DNF-7	—	
147	Manuele Mori	Italy	Lampre–Merida	32	76	+ 2h 28' 19"	
148	Przemysław Niemiec	Poland	Lampre–Merida	29	57	+ 2h 00' 28"	
149	José Serpa	Colombia	Lampre–Merida	34	21	+ 45' 08"	
151	Mark Cavendish	Great Britain	Omega Pharma–Quick-Step	28	148	+ 3h 52' 04"	
152	Sylvain Chavanel	France	Omega Pharma–Quick-Step	34	31	+ 1h 03' 41"	
153	Michał Kwiatkowski ‡	Poland	Omega Pharma–Quick-Step	23	11	+ 18' 59"	
154	Tony Martin	Germany	Omega Pharma–Quick-Step	28	106	+ 3h 05' 25"	
155	Jérôme Pineau	France	Omega Pharma–Quick-Step	33	159	+ 4h 03' 11"	
156	Gert Steegmans	Belgium	Omega Pharma–Quick-Step	32	153	+ 3h 59' 14"	
157	Niki Terpstra	Netherlands	Omega Pharma–Quick-Step	29	149	+ 3h 52' 05"	
158	Matteo Trentin ‡	Italy	Omega Pharma–Quick-Step	23	142	+ 3h 45' 30"	
159	Peter Velits	Slovakia	Omega Pharma–Quick-Step	28	25	+ 54' 00"	
161	Lars Boom	Netherlands	Belkin Pro Cycling	27	105	+ 3h 02' 52"	
162	Robert Gesink	Netherlands	Belkin Pro Cycling	27	26	+ 54' 25"	
163	Tom Leezer	Netherlands	Belkin Pro Cycling	27	150	+ 3h 53' 55"	
164	Bauke Mollema	Netherlands	Belkin Pro Cycling	26	6	+ 11' 42"	
165	Lars Petter Nordhaug	Norway	Belkin Pro Cycling	29	50	+ 1h 49' 42"	
166	Bram Tankink	Netherlands	Belkin Pro Cycling	34	64	+ 2h 10' 12"	
167	Laurens ten Dam	Netherlands	Belkin Pro Cycling	32	13	+ 21' 39"	
168	Sep Vanmarcke ‡	Belgium	Belkin Pro Cycling	24	131	+ 3h 34' 33"	
169	Maarten Wynants	Belgium	Belkin Pro Cycling	31	132	+ 3h 37' 06"	
171	Ryder Hesjedal	Canada	Garmin–Sharp	32	70	+ 2h 21' 41"	
172	Jack Bauer	New Zealand	Garmin–Sharp	28	DNF-19	—	
173	Tom Danielson	United States	Garmin–Sharp	35	60	+ 2h 05' 28"	
174	Rohan Dennis ‡	Australia	Garmin–Sharp	23	DNS-9	—	
175	Dan Martin	Ireland	Garmin–Sharp	26	33	+ 1h 13' 08"	
176	David Millar	Great Britain	Garmin–Sharp	36	113	+ 3h 14' 25"	
177	Ramūnas Navardauskas ‡	Lithuania	Garmin–Sharp	25	120	+ 3h 21' 29"	
178	Andrew Talansky ‡	United States	Garmin–Sharp	25	10	+ 17' 39"	
179	Christian Vande Velde	United States	Garmin–Sharp	37	DNF-7	—	
181	Simon Gerrans	Australia	Orica–GreenEDGE	33	80	+ 2h 34' 36"	
182	Michael Albasini	Switzerland	Orica–GreenEDGE	32	86	+ 2h 40' 22"	
183	Simon Clarke	Australia	Orica–GreenEDGE	26	68	+ 2h 20' 14"	
184	Matthew Goss	Australia	Orica–GreenEDGE	26	152	+ 3h 57' 24"	
185	Daryl Impey	South Africa	Orica–GreenEDGE	28	74	+ 2h 26' 37"	
186	Brett Lancaster	Australia	Orica–GreenEDGE	33	154	+ 4h 00' 19"	
187	Cameron Meyer ‡	Australia	Orica–GreenEDGE	25	130	+ 3h 32' 14"	
188	Stuart O'Grady	Australia	Orica–GreenEDGE	39	161	+ 4h 03' 27"	
189	Svein Tuft	Canada	Orica–GreenEDGE	36	169	+ 4h 27' 55"	
191	John Degenkolb ‡	Germany	Argos–Shimano	24	121	+ 3h 23' 23"	
192	Roy Curvers	Netherlands	Argos–Shimano	33	145	+ 3h 48' 30"	
193	Koen de Kort	Netherlands	Argos–Shimano	30	138	+ 3h 40' 55"	
194	Tom Dumoulin ‡	Netherlands	Argos–Shimano	22	41	+ 1h 34' 30"	
195	Johannes Fröhlinger	Germany	Argos–Shimano	28	146	+ 3h 49' 02"	
196	Simon Geschke	Germany	Argos–Shimano	27	75	+ 2h 27' 42"	
197	Marcel Kittel ‡	Germany	Argos–Shimano	25	166	+ 4h 10' 08"	
198	Albert Timmer	Netherlands	Argos–Shimano	28	164	+ 4h 07' 19"	
199	Tom Veelers	Netherlands	Argos–Shimano	28	DNF-19	—	
201	Wout Poels	Netherlands	Vacansoleil–DCM	25	28	+ 56' 33"	
202	Kris Boeckmans	Belgium	Vacansoleil–DCM	26	DNF-19	—	
203	Thomas De Gendt	Belgium	Vacansoleil–DCM	26	96	+ 2h 53' 41"	
204	Juan Antonio Flecha	Spain	Vacansoleil–DCM	35	93	+ 2h 48' 03"	
205	Johnny Hoogerland	Netherlands	Vacansoleil–DCM	30	101	+ 2h 57' 59"	
206	Sergey Lagutin	Uzbekistan	Vacansoleil–DCM	32	83	+ 2h 38' 55"	
207	Boy van Poppel ‡	Netherlands	Vacansoleil–DCM	25	144	+ 3h 48' 15"	
208	Danny van Poppel ‡	Netherlands	Vacansoleil–DCM	19	DNS-16	—	
209	Lieuwe Westra	Netherlands	Vacansoleil–DCM	30	DNF-21	—	
211	Brice Feillu	France	Sojasun	27	104	+ 2h 59' 45"	
212	Anthony Delaplace ‡	France	Sojasun	23	89	+ 2h 44' 13"	
213	Julien El Fares	France	Sojasun	28	81	+ 2h 36' 28"	
214	Jonathan Hivert	France	Sojasun	28	151	+ 3h 57' 09"	
215	Cyril Lemoine	France	Sojasun	30	112	+ 3h 11' 38"	
216	Jean-Marc Marino	France	Sojasun	29	116	+ 3h 16' 30"	
217	Maxime Méderel	France	Sojasun	32	52	+ 1h 53' 01"	
218	Julien Simon	France	Sojasun	27	87	+ 2h 41' 24"	
219	Alexis Vuillermoz ‡	France	Sojasun	25	46	+ 1h 40' 05"	

=== By team ===
Team Sky (SKY)
No.	Rider	Pos.
1	Chris Froome (GBR)	1
2	Edvald Boasson Hagen (NOR)	DNS-13
3	Peter Kennaugh (GBR) ‡	77
4	Vasil Kiryienka (BLR)	HD-9
5	David López (ESP)	127
6	Richie Porte (AUS)	19
7	Kanstantsin Sivtsov (BLR)	90
8	Ian Stannard (GBR)	135
9	Geraint Thomas (GBR)	140
Directeur sportif: Sean Yates

Cannondale (CAN)
No.	Rider	Pos.
11	Peter Sagan (SVK) ‡	82
12	Maciej Bodnar (POL)	114
13	Alessandro De Marchi (ITA)	71
14	Ted King (USA)	HD-4
15	Kristijan Koren (SLO)	100
16	Alan Marangoni (ITA)	111
17	Moreno Moser (ITA) ‡	94
18	Fabio Sabatini (ITA)	117
19	Brian Vandborg (DEN)	155
Directeur sportif: Stefano Zanatta

Lotto–Belisol (LTB)
No.	Rider	Pos.
21	Jurgen Van den Broeck (BEL)	DNS-6
22	Lars Bak (DEN)	108
23	Bart De Clercq (BEL)	38
24	André Greipel (GER)	129
25	Adam Hansen (AUS)	72
26	Greg Henderson (NZL)	162
27	Jürgen Roelandts (BEL)	160
28	Marcel Sieberg (GER)	DNF-19
29	Frederik Willems (BEL)	163
Directeur sportif: Herman Frison

BMC Racing Team (BMC)
No.	Rider	Pos.
31	Cadel Evans (AUS)	39
32	Brent Bookwalter (USA)	91
33	Marcus Burghardt (GER)	98
34	Philippe Gilbert (BEL)	62
35	Amaël Moinard (FRA)	56
36	Steve Morabito (SWI)	35
37	Manuel Quinziato (ITA)	85
38	Michael Schär (SWI)	DNS-9
39	Tejay van Garderen (USA) ‡	45
Directeur sportif: John Lelangue

RadioShack–Leopard (RLT)
No.	Rider	Pos.
41	Andy Schleck (LUX)	20
42	Jan Bakelants (BEL)	18
43	Laurent Didier (LUX)	53
44	Tony Gallopin (FRA) ‡	58
45	Markel Irizar (ESP)	103
46	Andreas Klöden (GER)	30
47	Maxime Monfort (BEL)	14
48	Jens Voigt (GER)	67
49	Haimar Zubeldia (ESP)	36
Directeur sportif: Kim Andersen

Team Europcar (EUC)
No.	Rider	Pos.
51	Pierre Rolland (FRA)	24
52	Yukiya Arashiro (JPN)	99
53	Jérôme Cousin (FRA) ‡	156
54	Cyril Gautier (FRA)	32
55	Yohann Gène (FRA)	158
56	Davide Malacarne (ITA)	49
57	Kévin Reza (FRA) ‡	134
58	David Veilleux (CAN)	123
59	Thomas Voeckler (FRA)	65
Directeur sportif: Andy Flickinger

Astana (AST)
No.	Rider	Pos.
61	Janez Brajkovič (SLO)	DNS-7
62	Assan Bazayev (KAZ)	168
63	Jakob Fuglsang (DEN)	7
64	Enrico Gasparotto (ITA)	95
65	Francesco Gavazzi (ITA)	84
66	Andrey Kashechkin (KAZ)	DNF-3
67	Fredrik Kessiakoff (SWE)	DNF-6
68	Alexey Lutsenko (KAZ) ‡	DNF-18
69	Dimitry Muravyev (KAZ)	167
Directeur sportif: Dimitri Sedoun

FDJ.fr (FDJ)
No.	Rider	Pos.
71	Thibaut Pinot (FRA) ‡	DNS-16
72	William Bonnet (FRA)	DNF-18
73	Nacer Bouhanni (FRA) ‡	DNF-6
74	Pierrick Fédrigo (FRA)	59
75	Murilo Fischer (BRA)	133
76	Alexandre Geniez (FRA) ‡	44
77	Arnold Jeannesson (FRA)	29
78	Jérémy Roy (FRA)	126
79	Arthur Vichot (FRA) ‡	66
Directeur sportif: Thierry Bricaud

Ag2r–La Mondiale (ALM)
No.	Rider	Pos.
81	Jean-Christophe Péraud (FRA)	DNF-17
82	Romain Bardet (FRA) ‡	15
83	Maxime Bouet (FRA)	DNS-6
84	Samuel Dumoulin (FRA)	143
85	Hubert Dupont (FRA)	34
86	John Gadret (FRA)	22
87	Blel Kadri (FRA)	125
88	Sébastien Minard (FRA)	124
89	Christophe Riblon (FRA)	37
Directeur sportif: Vincent Lavenu

Saxo–Tinkoff (SAX)
No.	Rider	Pos.
91	Alberto Contador (ESP)	4
92	Daniele Bennati (ITA)	107
93	Jesús Hernández (ESP)	43
94	Roman Kreuziger (CZE)	5
95	Benjamín Noval (ESP)	DNF-9
96	Sérgio Paulinho (POR)	136
97	Nicolas Roche (IRL)	40
98	Michael Rogers (AUS)	16
99	Matteo Tosatto (ITA)	92
Directeur sportif: Philippe Mauduit

Team Katusha (KAT)
No.	Rider	Pos.
101	Joaquim Rodríguez (ESP)	3
102	Pavel Brutt (RUS)	110
103	Alexander Kristoff (NOR)	147
104	Aleksandr Kuschynski (BLR)	141
105	Alberto Losada (ESP)	109
106	Daniel Moreno (ESP)	17
107	Gatis Smukulis (LAT)	119
108	Yuri Trofimov (RUS)	51
109	Eduard Vorganov (RUS)	48
Directeur sportif: Valerio Piva

Euskaltel–Euskadi (EUS)
No.	Rider	Pos.
111	Igor Antón (ESP)	69
112	Mikel Astarloza (ESP)	42
113	Gorka Izagirre (ESP)	DNS-17
114	Ion Izagirre (ESP) ‡	23
115	Juan José Lobato (ESP) ‡	78
116	Mikel Nieve (ESP)	12
117	Juan José Oroz (ESP)	165
118	Rubén Pérez (ESP)	139
119	Romain Sicard (FRA) ‡	122
Directeur sportif: Álvaro González de Galdeano

Movistar Team (MOV)
No.	Rider	Pos.
121	Alejandro Valverde (ESP)	8
122	Andrey Amador (CRC)	54
123	Jonathan Castroviejo (ESP)	97
124	Rui Costa (POR)	27
125	Imanol Erviti (ESP)	118
126	Iván Gutiérrez (ESP)	DNF-9
127	Rubén Plaza (ESP)	47
128	Nairo Quintana (COL) ‡	2
129	José Joaquín Rojas (ESP)	79
Directeur sportif: José Luis Arrieta

Cofidis (COF)
No.	Rider	Pos.
131	Rein Taaramäe (EST)	102
132	Yoann Bagot (FRA)	DNF-3
133	Jérôme Coppel (FRA)	63
134	Egoitz García (ESP)	115
135	Christophe Le Mével (FRA)	DNF-19
136	Guillaume Levarlet (FRA)	61
137	Luis Ángel Maté (ESP)	88
138	Rudy Molard (FRA) ‡	73
139	Daniel Navarro (ESP)	9
Directeur sportif: Didier Rous

Lampre–Merida (LAM)
No.	Rider	Pos.
141	Damiano Cunego (ITA)	55
142	Matteo Bono (ITA)	DNF-8
143	Davide Cimolai (ITA) ‡	137
144	Elia Favilli (ITA) ‡	128
145	Roberto Ferrari (ITA)	157
146	Adriano Malori (ITA) ‡	DNF-7
147	Manuele Mori (ITA)	76
148	Przemysław Niemiec (POL)	57
149	José Serpa (COL)	21
Directeur sportif: Orlando Maini

Omega Pharma–Quick-Step (OPQ)
No.	Rider	Pos.
151	Mark Cavendish (GBR)	148
152	Sylvain Chavanel (FRA)	31
153	Michał Kwiatkowski (POL) ‡	11
154	Tony Martin (GER)	106
155	Jérôme Pineau (FRA)	159
156	Gert Steegmans (BEL)	153
157	Niki Terpstra (NED)	149
158	Matteo Trentin (ITA) ‡	142
159	Peter Velits (SVK)	25
Directeur sportif: Wilfried Peeters

Belkin Pro Cycling (BEL)
No.	Rider	Pos.
161	Lars Boom (NED)	105
162	Robert Gesink (NED)	26
163	Tom Leezer (NED)	150
164	Bauke Mollema (NED)	6
165	Lars Petter Nordhaug (NOR)	50
166	Bram Tankink (NED)	64
167	Laurens ten Dam (NED)	13
168	Sep Vanmarcke (BEL) ‡	131
169	Maarten Wynants (BEL)	132
Directeur sportif: Nico Verhoeven

Garmin–Sharp (GRS)
No.	Rider	Pos.
171	Ryder Hesjedal (CAN)	70
172	Jack Bauer (NZL)	DNF-19
173	Tom Danielson (USA)	60
174	Rohan Dennis (AUS) ‡	DNS-9
175	Dan Martin (IRL)	33
176	David Millar (GBR)	113
177	Ramūnas Navardauskas (LIT) ‡	120
178	Andrew Talansky (USA) ‡	10
179	Christian Vande Velde (USA)	DNF-7
Directeur sportif: Charly Wegelius

Orica–GreenEDGE (OGE)
No.	Rider	Pos.
181	Simon Gerrans (AUS)	80
182	Michael Albasini (SWI)	86
183	Simon Clarke (AUS)	68
184	Matthew Goss (AUS)	152
185	Daryl Impey (RSA)	74
186	Brett Lancaster (AUS)	154
187	Cameron Meyer (AUS) ‡	130
188	Stuart O'Grady (AUS)	161
189	Svein Tuft (CAN)	169
Directeur sportif: Matt White

Argos–Shimano (ARG)
No.	Rider	Pos.
191	John Degenkolb (GER) ‡	121
192	Roy Curvers (NED)	145
193	Koen de Kort (NED)	138
194	Tom Dumoulin (NED) ‡	41
195	Johannes Fröhlinger (GER)	146
196	Simon Geschke (GER)	75
197	Marcel Kittel (GER) ‡	166
198	Albert Timmer (NED)	164
199	Tom Veelers (NED)	DNF-19
Directeur sportif: Christian Guiberteau

Vacansoleil–DCM (VCD)
No.	Rider	Pos.
201	Wout Poels (NED)	28
202	Kris Boeckmans (BEL)	DNF-19
203	Thomas De Gendt (BEL)	96
204	Juan Antonio Flecha (ESP)	93
205	Johnny Hoogerland (NED)	101
206	Sergey Lagutin (UZB)	83
207	Boy van Poppel (NED) ‡	144
208	Danny van Poppel (NED) ‡	DNS-16
209	Lieuwe Westra (NED)	DNF-21
Directeur sportif: Hilaire Van der Schueren

Sojasun (SOJ)
No.	Rider	Pos.
211	Brice Feillu (FRA)	104
212	Anthony Delaplace (FRA) ‡	89
213	Julien El Fares (FRA)	81
214	Jonathan Hivert (FRA)	151
215	Cyril Lemoine (FRA)	112
216	Jean-Marc Marino (FRA)	116
217	Maxime Méderel (FRA)	52
218	Julien Simon (FRA)	87
219	Alexis Vuillermoz (FRA) ‡	46
Directeur sportif: Nicolas Guille

=== By nationality ===
Country	No. of riders	Finishers	Stage wins
Australia	11	10	1 (Simon Gerrans ×1)
Belarus	3	2	
Belgium	12	10	1 (Jan Bakelants ×1)
Brazil	1	1	
Canada	3	3	
Colombia	2	2	1 (Nairo Quintana ×1)
Costa Rica	1	1	
Czech Republic	1	1	
Denmark	3	3	
Estonia	1	1	
France	42	35	1 (Christophe Riblon ×1)
Germany	10	9	6 (Marcel Kittel ×4, André Greipel ×1, Tony Martin ×1)
Ireland	2	2	1 (Dan Martin ×1)
Italy	18	16	1 (Matteo Trentin ×1)
Japan	1	1	
Kazakhstan	4	2	
Latvia	1	1	
Lithuania	1	1	
Luxembourg	2	2	
Netherlands	17	14	
New Zealand	2	1	
Norway	3	2	
Poland	3	3	
Portugal	2	2	2 (Rui Costa ×2)
Russia	3	3	
Slovakia	2	2	1 (Peter Sagan ×1)
Slovenia	2	1	
South Africa	1	1	
Spain	27	24	
Sweden	1	0	
Switzerland	3	2	
Great Britain	6	6	5 (Mark Cavendish ×2, Chris Froome ×3)
United States	6	4	
Uzbekistan	1	1	
Total	198	169	20 (Note: The team time trial on stage four, won by Orica–GreenEDGE, is not counted in this total.)
