= Ace Brigode discography =

Ace Brigode & His Virginians were prominent in the early 1920s jazz scene, with their recordings spanning from 1923 to 1925, and a notable return in 1940 under the simplified name Ace Brigode and his Orchestra. Their initial releases in 1923 with Okeh Records included hits such as "You, Darling, You". By 1924, the group expanded to Ace Brigode & His Fourteen Virginians, producing an array of records that featured tunes like "Colorado-Waltz," among others, continuing their successful run across various record labels, including Columbia and Edison. In 1925, they maintained their momentum with tracks like "Alabamy Bound," showcasing a range from upbeat jazz numbers to sentimental ballads. Their recording activity in this period included "Normandy" and the whimsically titled "Why Aren't Yez Eatin' More Oranges?"

After a hiatus, Ace Brigode revived the ensemble as Ace Brigode and his Orchestra in 1940, marking their comeback with Vocalion Records. Their 1940 recordings, such as "Charley, My Boy" signified a continuation of their musical journey, blending traditional jazz elements, with the evolving sounds of the era.

Ace Brigode's band varied in number and players. His band included Abe Lincoln, Al Delaney, Al Tresize, Bob Tinsley, Bud Lincoln, C. Sexton, Cliff Gamet, Dick Ulm, Dillon Ober, Don Juille, Eddie Allen, Frank Skinner, Fred Brohez, Gene Fogarthy, Happy Masefield, Ignaz Berber, Jeremy Freshour, Lucien Criner, Mark Fisher, Nick Cortez, Penn Fay, Teddy King, Ray Welch, and others. On some labels the recordings are attributed to other names such as Corona Dance Orchestra and Denza Dance Band.

== Ace Brigode & His Ten Virginians ==
=== 1923 ===
November 26 (Okeh)

- You, Darling, You
- Oklahoma Indian Jazz
- Dreams Daddy
- More

== Ace Brigode & His Fourteen Virginians ==
=== 1924 ===
c. March 18 (Okeh)

- Colorado-Waltz
- Monavanna

April 4 (Okeh)

- Never Again
- Don't Mind the Rain

c. June 30 (Okeh)

- Don't Take Your Troubles to Bed
- Only You!

c. August 13 (Okeh)

- Dreary Weather
- Follow the Swallow

c. October 13 (Okeh)

- Bye Bye, Baby
- A Sun-Kist Cottage (in California)

=== 1925 ===
January 13 (Columbia)

- Alabamy Bound
- A Sun-Kist Cottage (in California)

January 23 (Edison)

- Ever-Lovin' Bee
- In the Shade of a Sheltering Tree

February 20 (Edison)

- Tokio Blues
- I'll See You in My Dreams

March 10 (Columbia)

- What a Smile Can Do
- When I Think of You

March 25 (Edison)

- Fooling
- When I Think of You

c. April 24 (Cameo)

- My Sugar
- Wondering

April 30 (Columbia)

- Sleeping Beauty's Wedding
- Yes, Sir! That's My Baby v.2

June 2 (Columbia)

- Wait'll It's Moonlight
- Make Those Naughty Eyes Behave

July 15 (Columbia)

- Alone at Last
- I'm Tired of Everything But You

c. September 1 (Cameo)

- Close Your Eyes
- Tweedle-Dee, Tweedle-Doo (You'll Love Me, I'll Love You)

October 6 (Columbia)

- Normandy
- Why Aren't Yez Eatin' More Oranges?

== Ace Brigode and his Orchestra ==
=== 1940 ===
January 23 (Vocalion)

- Charley, My Boy
- Why Should I Cry Over You?
- I'm Givin' You Warning
- You Know You Belong to Somebody Else (So Why Don't You Leave Me Alone?)
