= Ted King =

Ted King may refer to:

- Teddy King (1884–1952), English footballer who played for Leicester City
- Ted King (cyclist) (born 1983), American cyclist
- Ted King (actor) (born 1965), American actor
