= Port de Pailhères =

Col de Pailhères
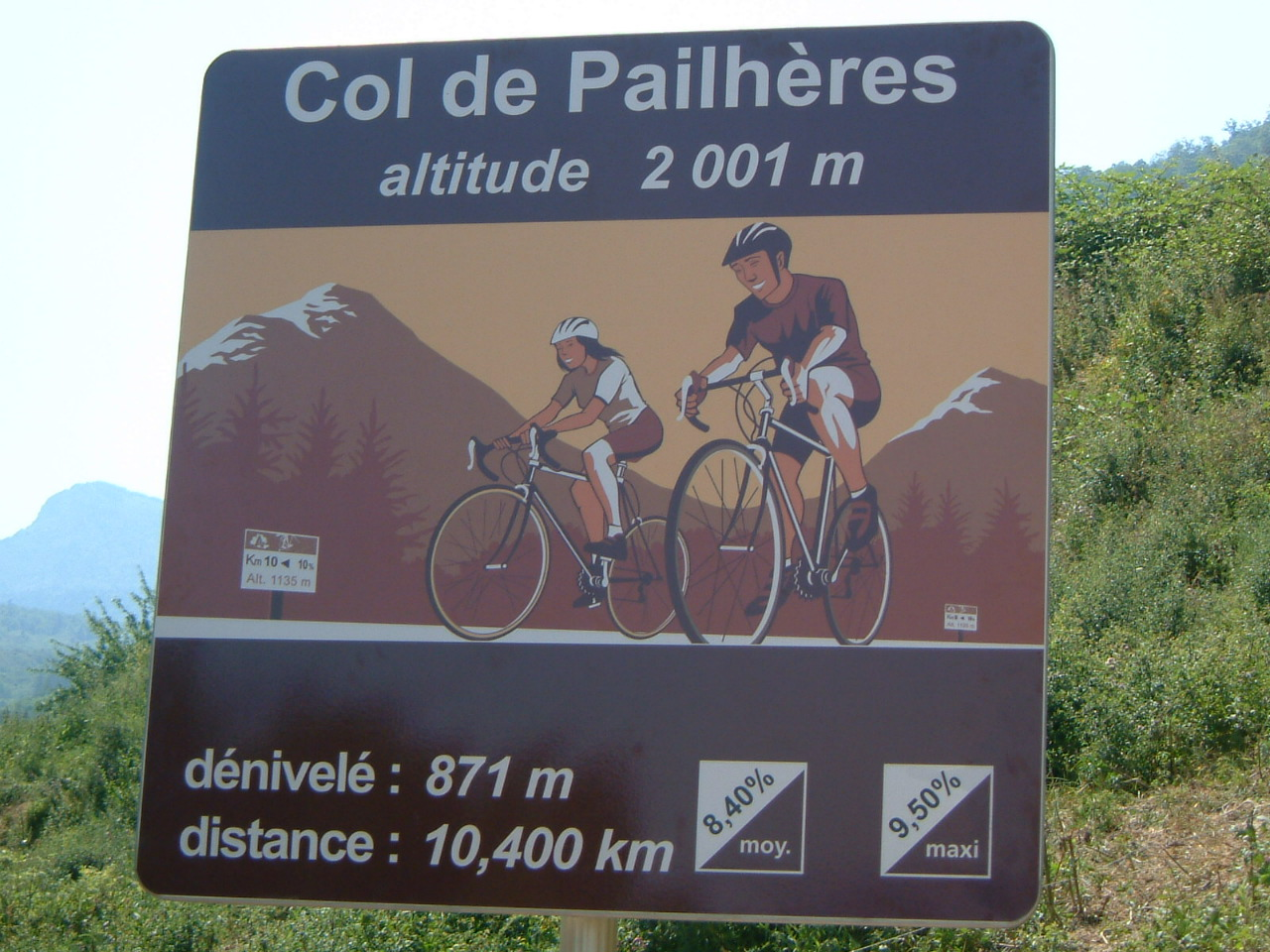
- Sign at Mijanès at the start of the Col de Pailhères

- Location within Pyrenees
- Elevation: 2,001 m (6,565 ft)
- Traversed by: D25

Third Approach
- Location: Ariège, France
- Range: Pyrenees
- Coordinates: 42°44′0″N 01°59′33″E

The Col de Pailhères (elevation 2,001 m (6,565 ft)) is a mountain pass in the Ariège department of the French Pyrenees, located on the secondary road D25 between Mijanès (south-east) and Ax-les-Thermes (west).

Port de Pailhères (elevation 1,963 m (6,440 ft)) is located nearby, 400 m southwest. It is the lowest point between the valleys but from there the road D25 to Mijanès direction runs via the Col de Pailhères.

== Details of climb ==
Starting from Mijanes, the Col de Pailhères is 10.6 km (6.6 mi) long. Over this distance, the climb is 871 m (2,858 ft) (an average gradient of 8.2%) with a maximum gradient of 10.2%.

Starting from Ax-les-Thermes, the Col de Pailhères is 18.6 km (11.6 mi) long. Over this distance, the climb is 1,281 m (4,203 ft), (an average gradient of 6.9%) with a maximum gradient of 10.4% near the summit.

== Tour de France ==
The climb has been used in five stages of the Tour de France cycle race with its first appearance coming in 2003. In 2013, it was used on the eighth stage, when the riders also competed for the Souvenir Henri Desgrange.

=== Appearances in Tour de France ===
| Year | Stage | Category | Start | Finish | Leader at the summit |
|---|---|---|---|---|---|
| 2003 | 13 | 1 | Toulouse | Ax-3 Domaines | Juan Miguel Mercado (ESP) |
| 2005 | 14 | HC | Agde | Ax-3 Domaines | Georg Totschnig (AUT) |
| 2007 | 14 | HC | Mazamet | Plateau-de-Beille | Rubén Pérez (ESP) |
| 2010 | 14 | HC | Revel | Ax-3 Domaines | Christophe Riblon (FRA) |
| 2013 | 8 | HC | Castres | Ax-3 Domaines | Nairo Quintana (COL) |
