= Brigode =

Brigode is a surname. Notable people with the surname include:

- Ace Brigode (1893–1960), American dance band leader
- Jane Brigode (1870–1952), Belgian liberal and politician
