= 2008 UCI Track Cycling World Championships – Men's points race =

Men's points race at the 2008 UCI Track Cycling World Championships
- Venue: Manchester Velodrome, Manchester
- Date: 28 March 2008

The Men's points race event of the 2008 UCI Track Cycling World Championships was held on 28 March 2008.

== Results ==
Rank	Name	Nation	S1	S2	S3	S4	S5	S6	S7	S8	S9	S10	S11	S12	S13	S14	S15	S16	Laps	Points
1	Vasili Kiryienka	Belarus	3	5			3	2	3			3			2	2	1			24
2	Christophe Riblon	France									3		5		5		5	5		23
3	Peter Schep	Netherlands						5	5			1	3	5						19
4	Cameron Meyer	Australia	2	2		3		1			2				3	5				18
5	Greg Henderson	New Zealand			1		5			3		5			1	1		1		17
6	Milan Kadlec	Czech Republic			3						5		2	2			2			14
7	Juan Esteban Arango	Colombia				5				1							3			9
8	Rafał Ratajczyk	Poland						3		5										8
9	Kam-Po Wong	Hong Kong		3														2		5
10	Mikhail Ignatiev	Russia					2									3				5
11	Milton Wynants Vazquez	Uruguay			5															5
12	Martino Marcotto	Italy												1				3		4
13	Iljo Keisse	Belgium				2			2											4
14	Mark Cavendish	United Kingdom												3						3
15	Makoto Iijima	Japan		1								2								3
16	Joan Llaneras Rosello	Spain				1	1						1							3
17	Marco Arriagada	Chile								2	1									3
18	Andreas Graf	Austria			2															2
19	Colby Pearce	United States							1											1
20	Casper Jorgensen	Denmark																		0
DNF	Zachary Bell	Canada	5																-20	-15
DNF	Dimitrios Gkaliouris	Greece																	-20	-20
DNF	Chun Kai Feng	Chinese Taipei	1																-20	-19
