= 2013 Tour de France, Stage 1 to Stage 11 =

Stages of cycle race

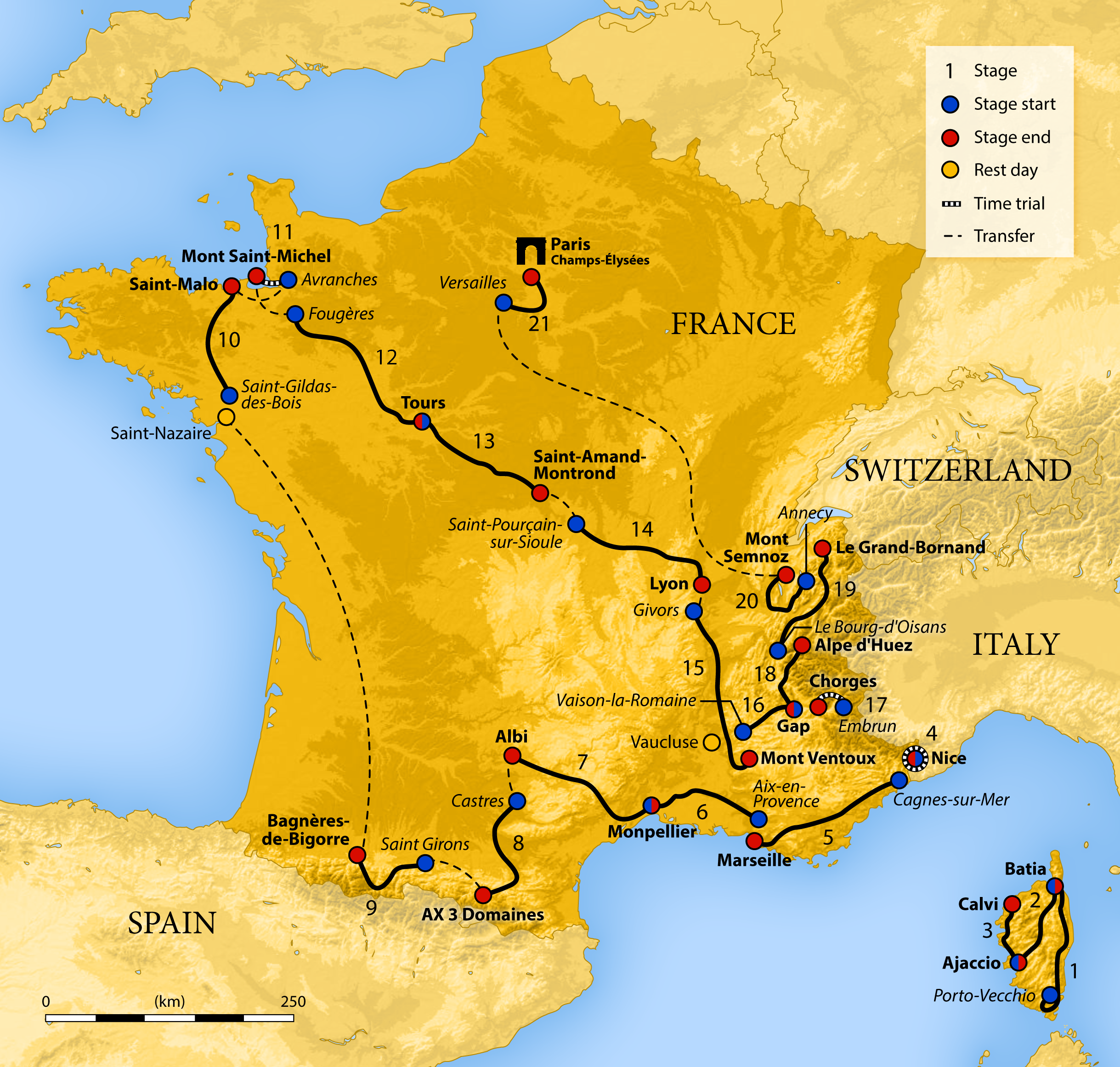
Route of the 2013 Tour de France

The 2013 Tour de France was the 100th Tour de France. It ran from 29 June 2013 to 21 July 2013, starting in the city of Porto-Vecchio in Corsica, with the island hosting the first three stages. Corsica was the only Metropolitan region, and Corse-du-Sud and Haute-Corse were the only Metropolitan departments, through which the Tour had never previously passed and the organisers wanted to combine the 100th edition of the Tour with the Tour's first ever visit to Corsica.

The opening stage was a standard road stage rather than the more usual Individual time trial or "Prologue".

To accommodate the tour entourage during their stay in Corsica, the organisers chartered the Mega Smeralda cruiseferry to house members of the organisation, media and others who work on the Tour and to host press conferences, although the riders stayed in hotels in and around Porto-Vecchio.

== Stage 1 ==
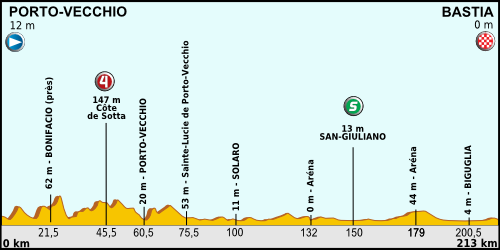
Stage profile

29 June 2013 — Porto-Vecchio to Bastia, 213 km (132.4 mi)

The first stage of the race was a relatively flat stage on the east coast of Corsica and was expected to end with a sprint finish, with Mark Cavendish looking to claim the sprint and with it the maillot jaune for the overall race leader.

The Tour started out inauspiciously for top favourite Chris Froome of Team Sky, as he crashed in the neutralised area before the true beginning of the stage although he was not hurt. Once the flag came down to signal the true beginning of the stage, five riders immediately distinguished themselves as the day's principal escape group – Jérôme Cousin of Team Europcar, Euskaltel–Euskadi's Juan José Lobato, Belkin Pro Cycling rider Lars Boom, Juan Antonio Flecha representing Vacansoleil–DCM, and Cyril Lemoine from Sojasun. The peloton did not allow them very much lead, as the mostly Omega Pharma–Quick-Step-paced main field kept the time gap between two and three minutes for the majority of the stage. The fourth-category Cote de Sotta came at the 45 km (28.0 mi) mark in the stage, the only climb on the day's parcours. This meant that the first rider, from the breakaway, over the line would be the first holder of the polka-dot jersey. It was Lobato who crossed first, beating out Cousin and Boom, and Lobato pulled on the climber's jersey at day's end.

At that point the breakaway sat up (stopped riding hard) and attempted to rejoin the peloton behind them, since the stage's flat profile (and its prestige) meant it was extremely unlikely they could stay away for victory. The time gap got to as little as 39 seconds before eventually getting as high again as four minutes. After both the break and the peloton had passed through the feeding station, it was again reduced to 40 seconds. Four of the riders again looked to sit up and abandon their efforts, but Cousin continued to ride, and eventually so did the whole breakaway group. For these efforts, Cousin was awarded the daily combativity award at stage's end. The time gap then got as large as four minutes, allowing the breakaway to contest the intermediate sprint as well. This one went to Boom ahead of Flecha. A few minutes later, three of the Tour's top sprinters André Greipel, Mark Cavendish, and Peter Sagan sprinted for the points available to them, coming across the line in that very order. The breakaway were at last caught with 37 km (23.0 mi) remaining in the stage, and the teams set up for the anticipated sprint finale.

It was about this time that reports came through of a problem at the finish line – a bus for the Orica–GreenEDGE team had become stuck under the finishing arch. It was too tall to pass through. It disrupted the electronic timing for the stage, but the more pressing problem was the fact that the finish line was not clear to be covered by the cyclists. Race officials tried to extricate the bus, having no success for several minutes as the riders came nearer and nearer to the finish line. As the peloton passed through the 10 km (6.2 mi) to go mark, the decision was sent out over race radio for the finish line to be moved to the banner representing 3 km (1.9 mi) to the (original) finish line. Around this same time, the day's first major crash occurred, sending, among numerous others, 2012 Giro d'Italia champion Ryder Hesjedal off his bicycle. At approximately 6 km (3.7 mi) to go the original finish, meaning 3 km (1.9 mi) to go the revised finish line, teams such as Lotto–Belisol and Cannondale had begun their leadouts.

It was at this point that the bus was successfully removed from under the finishing arch, so race officials chose to move the stage finish back to the original finishing line. Also at this point, a crash of tremendous scope thinned the possible stage winners substantially, as sprinters Sagan, Cavendish, and Matthew Goss all either fell themselves or were caught behind the crash. Greipel, for his part, managed to stay upright and at the front of the race through both crashes, but a mechanical issue ended his chances at a stage victory and a yellow jersey. His German compatriot, 24-year-old Marcel Kittel from the Argos–Shimano team, was the rider who profited from the day's chaos and took stage honours, with the yellow, green, and white jerseys to go with it. No time gaps were taken on the stage – all 197 other riders in the field were given the same time as Kittel. Along with sprinters who missed out on the possibility at a stage win, some overall contenders and noteworthy stage-hunters also crashed. Alberto Contador crashed, and while his injuries were not severe enough to force him to retire from the race, he did express concern that they might keep him from being able to ride in optimal position for the upcoming team time trial. Tony Martin and Ted King sustained perhaps the worst injuries of anyone; Martin sustained a concussion and a lung contusion to go along with soft tissue damage and a deep shoulder wound, and King suffered a badly bruised and possibly broken shoulder. Tejay van Garderen, Philippe Gilbert, Gert Steegmans, Janez Brajkovič, Tony Gallopin, and Murilo Fischer all also crashed. Geraint Thomas also crashed, suffering a hairline fracture to his pelvis in the incident.

After the stage, Cavendish, Lotto–Belisol rider Greg Henderson, and FDJ.fr team boss Marc Madiot all expressed their displeasure with race officials for moving the finish back to the original line while the teams were at sprint speed racing for the supposed finish at the 3 km (1.9 mi) banner. Henderson's criticisms focused on the effects the rapid changes had on the competitive aspect of the race, while Cavendish and Madiot were more concerned with how they affected rider safety. Orica–GreenEDGE were fined 2,000 Swiss francs for "not respecting the timetable put in place for auxiliary team vehicles arriving at the stage finish" as a result of the incident. For his part, stage winner Kittel claimed not to have heard the instructions over race radio for the revised finish at the 3 km (1.9 mi) banner, which would seem to have played a part in his being focused to ride hard for the original finish line and take the day's honours.

Stage 1 result

Rank	Rider	Team	Time
1	Marcel Kittel (GER)	Argos–Shimano	4h 56' 52"
2	Alexander Kristoff (NOR)	Team Katusha	s.t.
3	Danny van Poppel (NED)	Vacansoleil–DCM	s.t.
4	David Millar (GBR)	Garmin–Sharp	s.t.
5	Matteo Trentin (ITA)	Omega Pharma–Quick-Step	s.t.
6	Samuel Dumoulin (FRA)	Ag2r–La Mondiale	s.t.
7	Greg Henderson (NZL)	Lotto–Belisol	s.t.
8	Jürgen Roelandts (BEL)	Lotto–Belisol	s.t.
9	José Joaquín Rojas (ESP)	Movistar Team	s.t.
10	Kris Boeckmans (BEL)	Vacansoleil–DCM	s.t.

General classification after stage 1

Rank	Rider	Team	Time
1	Marcel Kittel (GER)	Argos–Shimano	4h 56' 52"
2	Alexander Kristoff (NOR)	Team Katusha	+ 0"
3	Danny van Poppel (NED)	Vacansoleil–DCM	+ 0"
4	David Millar (GBR)	Garmin–Sharp	+ 0"
5	Matteo Trentin (ITA)	Omega Pharma–Quick-Step	+ 0"
6	Samuel Dumoulin (FRA)	Ag2r–La Mondiale	+ 0"
7	Greg Henderson (NZL)	Lotto–Belisol	+ 0"
8	Jürgen Roelandts (BEL)	Lotto–Belisol	+ 0"
9	José Joaquín Rojas (ESP)	Movistar Team	+ 0"
10	Kris Boeckmans (BEL)	Vacansoleil–DCM	+ 0"

== Stage 2 ==
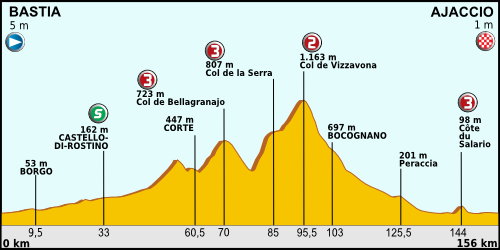
Stage profile

30 June 2013 — Bastia to Ajaccio, 156 km (96.9 mi)

The tour crossed the island to Ajaccio on the west coast, with four ranked climbs including the Category 2 Col de Vizzavona (1,163 m (3,816 ft)) after 95 km (59.0 mi) and a Category 3 climb 12 km (7.5 mi) before the finish.

The day started with an opening attack within the opening kilometre and the formation of the day's breakaway by the 6 km (3.7 mi) mark. The break consisted of Rubén Pérez of Euskaltel–Euskadi, Belkin Pro Cycling's Lars Boom, Team Europcar rider David Veilleux, and Blel Kadri for Ag2r–La Mondiale and expanded their lead to three minutes in the first hour of racing. Boom crossed the intermediate sprint point ahead of his breakaway compatriots, while André Greipel (Lotto–Belisol) lead the peloton across the same point, beating Cannondale's Peter Sagan. The four breakaway riders started the climb of the Col de Bellagranajo with a 1' 50" advantage that was cut to a 1' 00" advantage at the summit of the climb.

Veilleux and Kadri broke away from their companions at the start of the second climb while Veilleux's team-mate Thomas Voeckler attacked from the peloton, but was quickly brought back. At this point, a gruppetto was forming which included the yellow jersey Marcel Kittel (Argos–Shimano) as well as the other top sprinters in the tour. Pierre Rolland attacked from the peloton and was followed by Sojasun's Brice Feillu. Rolland passed the breakaway riders and crossed the summit first, but was caught by the peloton on the col de Vizzavona after a concerted effort from FDJ.fr and Team Sky. On the final climb of the day, separate attacks were made by Team Europcar's Cyril Gautier, Chris Froome (Team Sky), and Juan Antonio Flecha of Vacansoleil–DCM; each of which was unsuccessful. With 7 km (4.3 mi) to go, Sylvain Chavanel (Omega Pharma–Quick-Step) attacked and was joined by RadioShack–Leopard's Jan Bakelants, Euskaltel–Euskadi rider Gorka Izagirre, Manuele Mori for Lampre–Merida, Astana's Jakob Fuglsang, and Flecha. The leading peloton picked off members of the breakaway one by one, until only Bakelants remained. Bakelants finished across the line a second in front of Sagan, earning himself his first Tour stage victory and the yellow jersey.

Stage 2 result

Rank	Rider	Team	Time
1	Jan Bakelants (BEL)	RadioShack–Leopard	3h 43' 11"
2	Peter Sagan (SVK)	Cannondale	+ 1"
3	Michał Kwiatkowski (POL)	Omega Pharma–Quick-Step	+ 1"
4	Davide Cimolai (ITA)	Lampre–Merida	+ 1"
5	Edvald Boasson Hagen (NOR)	Team Sky	+ 1"
6	Julien Simon (FRA)	Sojasun	+ 1"
7	Francesco Gavazzi (ITA)	Astana	+ 1"
8	Daryl Impey (RSA)	Orica–GreenEDGE	+ 1"
9	Daniele Bennati (ITA)	Saxo–Tinkoff	+ 1"
10	Sergey Lagutin (UZB)	Vacansoleil–DCM	+ 1"

General classification after stage 2

Rank	Rider	Team	Time
1	Jan Bakelants (BEL)	RadioShack–Leopard	8h 40' 03"
2	David Millar (GBR)	Garmin–Sharp	+ 1"
3	Julien Simon (FRA)	Sojasun	+ 1"
4	Daryl Impey (RSA)	Orica–GreenEDGE	+ 1"
5	Edvald Boasson Hagen (NOR)	Team Sky	+ 1"
6	Simon Gerrans (AUS)	Orica–GreenEDGE	+ 1"
7	Michał Kwiatkowski (POL)	Omega Pharma–Quick-Step	+ 1"
8	Sergey Lagutin (UZB)	Vacansoleil–DCM	+ 1"
9	Christophe Riblon (FRA)	Ag2r–La Mondiale	+ 1"
10	Cadel Evans (AUS)	BMC Racing Team	+ 1"

== Stage 3 ==
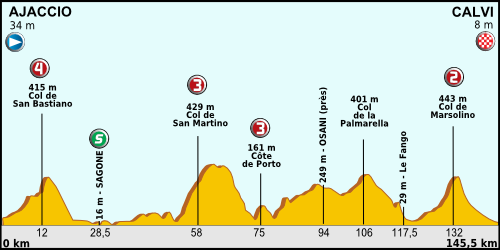
Stage profile

1 July 2013 — Ajaccio to Calvi, 145.5 km (90.4 mi)

The third and final day on Corsica saw the race return northwards again along the rugged west coast with several small climbs including the short but steep climb of the Category 2 Col de Marsolino (443 m (1,453 ft)), 13 km (8.1 mi) before the finish in Calvi. Simon Gerrans won the stage.

Stage 3 result

Rank	Rider	Team	Time
1	Simon Gerrans (AUS)	Orica–GreenEDGE	3h 41' 24"
2	Peter Sagan (SVK)	Cannondale	s.t.
3	José Joaquín Rojas (ESP)	Movistar Team	s.t.
4	Michał Kwiatkowski (POL)	Omega Pharma–Quick-Step	s.t.
5	Philippe Gilbert (BEL)	BMC Racing Team	s.t.
6	Juan Antonio Flecha (ESP)	Vacansoleil–DCM	s.t.
7	Francesco Gavazzi (ITA)	Astana	s.t.
8	Maxime Bouet (FRA)	Ag2r–La Mondiale	s.t.
9	Julien Simon (FRA)	Sojasun	s.t.
10	Gorka Izagirre (ESP)	Euskaltel–Euskadi	s.t.

General classification after stage 3

Rank	Rider	Team	Time
1	Jan Bakelants (BEL)	RadioShack–Leopard	12h 21' 27"
2	Julien Simon (FRA)	Sojasun	+ 1"
3	Simon Gerrans (AUS)	Orica–GreenEDGE	+ 1"
4	Michał Kwiatkowski (POL)	Omega Pharma–Quick-Step	+ 1"
5	Edvald Boasson Hagen (NOR)	Team Sky	+ 1"
6	Daryl Impey (RSA)	Orica–GreenEDGE	+ 1"
7	David Millar (GBR)	Garmin–Sharp	+ 1"
8	Sergey Lagutin (UZB)	Vacansoleil–DCM	+ 1"
9	Cadel Evans (AUS)	BMC Racing Team	+ 1"
10	Romain Bardet (FRA)	Ag2r–La Mondiale	+ 1"

== Stage 4 ==
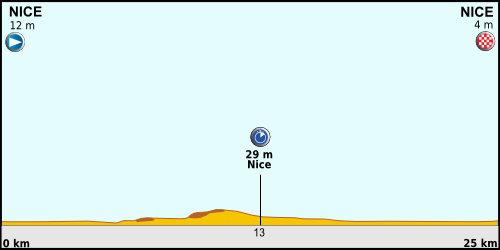
Stage profile

2 July 2013 — Nice to Nice, 25 km (15.5 mi) team time trial (TTT)

The first stage on mainland France was a team time trial, in which each team's time was taken when their fifth rider crosses the line. The race commenced in the Jardin Albert I and looped around the streets of Nice until reaching the Promenade des Anglais after 1.5 km (0.9 mi). The route then followed the seafront for 6.5 km (4.0 mi) before turning north at Nice Côte d'Azur Airport to follow the Var valley. The intermediate time check came at 13 km (8.1 mi), after which the race turned south and returned via the Promenade des Anglais to the Jardin Albert I.

American cyclist Ted King, who was nursing a shoulder injury, was controversially eliminated from the tour after riding on his own using a standard road bike (rather than a time trial bike) and finishing seven seconds outside the cutoff time. Many felt that race officials should have taken account of his courage in completing the stage and allowed him to continue the tour.

Stage 4 result

Rank	Team	Time
1	Orica–GreenEDGE	25' 56"
2	Omega Pharma–Quick-Step	+ 1"
3	Team Sky	+ 3"
4	Saxo–Tinkoff	+ 9"
5	Lotto–Belisol	+ 17"
6	Garmin–Sharp	+ 17"
7	Movistar Team	+ 20"
8	Lampre–Merida	+ 25"
9	BMC Racing Team	+ 26"
10	Team Katusha	+ 28"

General classification after stage 4

Rank	Rider	Team	Time
1	Simon Gerrans (AUS)	Orica–GreenEDGE	12h 47' 24"
2	Daryl Impey (RSA)	Orica–GreenEDGE	+ 0"
3	Michael Albasini (SUI)	Orica–GreenEDGE	+ 0"
4	Michał Kwiatkowski (POL)	Omega Pharma–Quick-Step	+ 1"
5	Sylvain Chavanel (FRA)	Omega Pharma–Quick-Step	+ 1"
6	Edvald Boasson Hagen (NOR)	Team Sky	+ 3"
7	Chris Froome (GBR)	Team Sky	+ 3"
8	Richie Porte (AUS)	Team Sky	+ 3"
9	Nicolas Roche (IRL)	Saxo–Tinkoff	+ 9"
10	Roman Kreuziger (CZE)	Saxo–Tinkoff	+ 9"

== Stage 5 ==
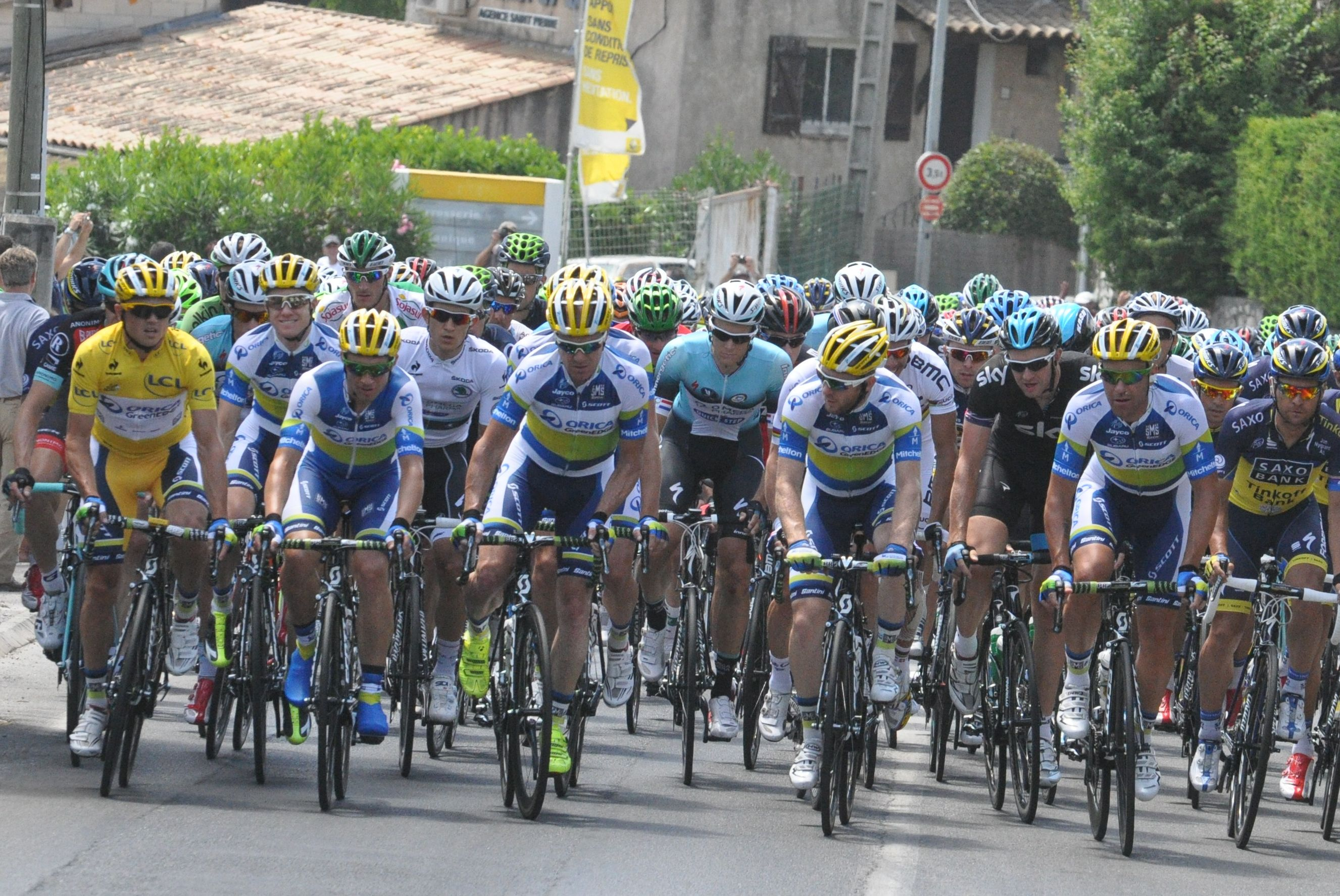
Peloton during the stage

3 July 2013 — Cagnes-sur-Mer to Marseille, 228.5 km (142.0 mi)

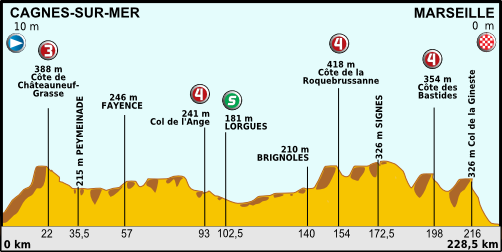
Stage profile

The fifth stage took the riders westwards through Provence, crossing four small categorised climbs before reaching the port of Marseille, finishing at Parc Borély, to the south of the city centre. Mark Cavendish won the stage which was the 24th Tour de France stage victory of his career.

Stage 5 result

Rank	Rider	Team	Time
1	Mark Cavendish (GBR)	Omega Pharma–Quick-Step	5h 31' 51"
2	Edvald Boasson Hagen (NOR)	Team Sky	s.t.
3	Peter Sagan (SVK)	Cannondale	s.t.
4	André Greipel (GER)	Lotto–Belisol	s.t.
5	Roberto Ferrari (ITA)	Lampre–Merida	s.t.
6	Alexander Kristoff (NOR)	Team Katusha	s.t.
7	Juan José Lobato (ESP)	Euskaltel–Euskadi	s.t.
8	Ramūnas Navardauskas (LTU)	Garmin–Sharp	s.t.
9	Cyril Lemoine (FRA)	Sojasun	s.t.
10	José Joaquín Rojas (ESP)	Movistar Team	s.t.

General classification after stage 5

Rank	Rider	Team	Time
1	Simon Gerrans (AUS)	Orica–GreenEDGE	18h 19' 15"
2	Daryl Impey (RSA)	Orica–GreenEDGE	+ 0"
3	Michael Albasini (SUI)	Orica–GreenEDGE	+ 0"
4	Michał Kwiatkowski (POL)	Omega Pharma–Quick-Step	+ 1"
5	Sylvain Chavanel (FRA)	Omega Pharma–Quick-Step	+ 1"
6	Edvald Boasson Hagen (NOR)	Team Sky	+ 3"
7	Chris Froome (GBR)	Team Sky	+ 3"
8	Richie Porte (AUS)	Team Sky	+ 3"
9	Nicolas Roche (IRL)	Saxo–Tinkoff	+ 9"
10	Roman Kreuziger (CZE)	Saxo–Tinkoff	+ 9"

== Stage 6 ==
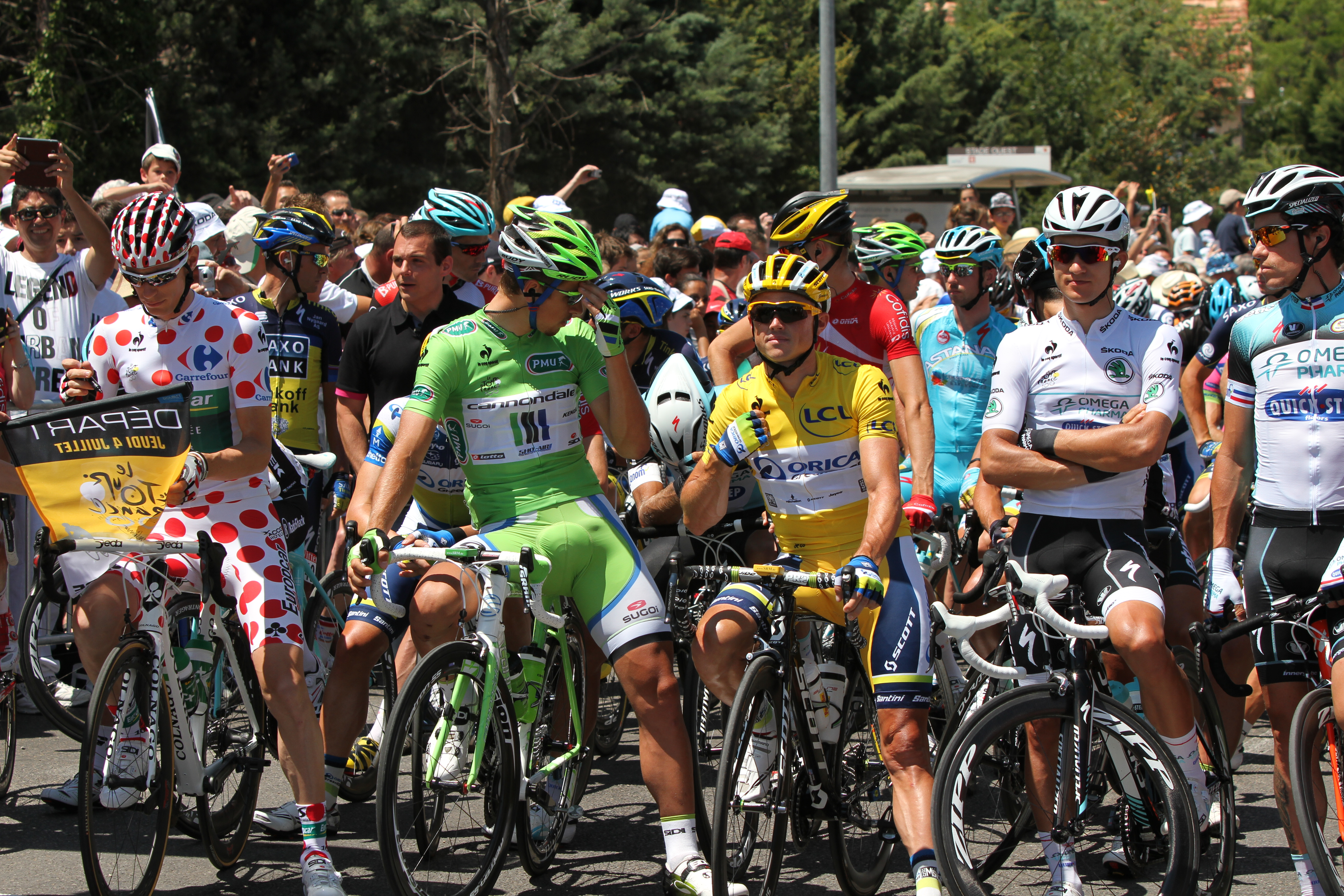
Line up before the start

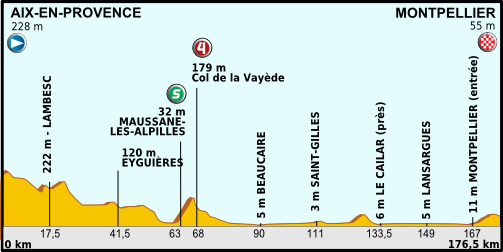
Stage profile

4 July 2013 — Aix-en-Provence to Montpellier, 176.5 km (109.7 mi)

The race continued westwards through southern France into Languedoc. The stage was won by André Greipel in a sprint finish.

Stage 6 result

Rank	Rider	Team	Time
1	André Greipel (GER)	Lotto–Belisol	3h 59' 02"
2	Peter Sagan (SVK)	Cannondale	s.t.
3	Marcel Kittel (GER)	Argos–Shimano	s.t.
4	Mark Cavendish (GBR)	Omega Pharma–Quick-Step	s.t.
5	Juan José Lobato (ESP)	Euskaltel–Euskadi	s.t.
6	Alexander Kristoff (NOR)	Team Katusha	s.t.
7	José Joaquín Rojas (ESP)	Movistar Team	s.t.
8	Danny van Poppel (NED)	Vacansoleil–DCM	s.t.
9	Roberto Ferrari (ITA)	Lampre–Merida	s.t.
10	Samuel Dumoulin (FRA)	Ag2r–La Mondiale	s.t.

General classification after stage 6

Rank	Rider	Team	Time
1	Daryl Impey (RSA)	Orica–GreenEDGE	22h 18' 17"
2	Edvald Boasson Hagen (NOR)	Team Sky	+ 3"
3	Simon Gerrans (AUS)	Orica–GreenEDGE	+ 5"
4	Michael Albasini (SUI)	Orica–GreenEDGE	+ 5"
5	Michał Kwiatkowski (POL)	Omega Pharma–Quick-Step	+ 6"
6	Sylvain Chavanel (FRA)	Omega Pharma–Quick-Step	+ 6"
7	Chris Froome (GBR)	Team Sky	+ 8"
8	Richie Porte (AUS)	Team Sky	+ 8"
9	Nicolas Roche (IRL)	Saxo–Tinkoff	+ 14"
10	Roman Kreuziger (CZE)	Saxo–Tinkoff	+ 14"

== Stage 7 ==
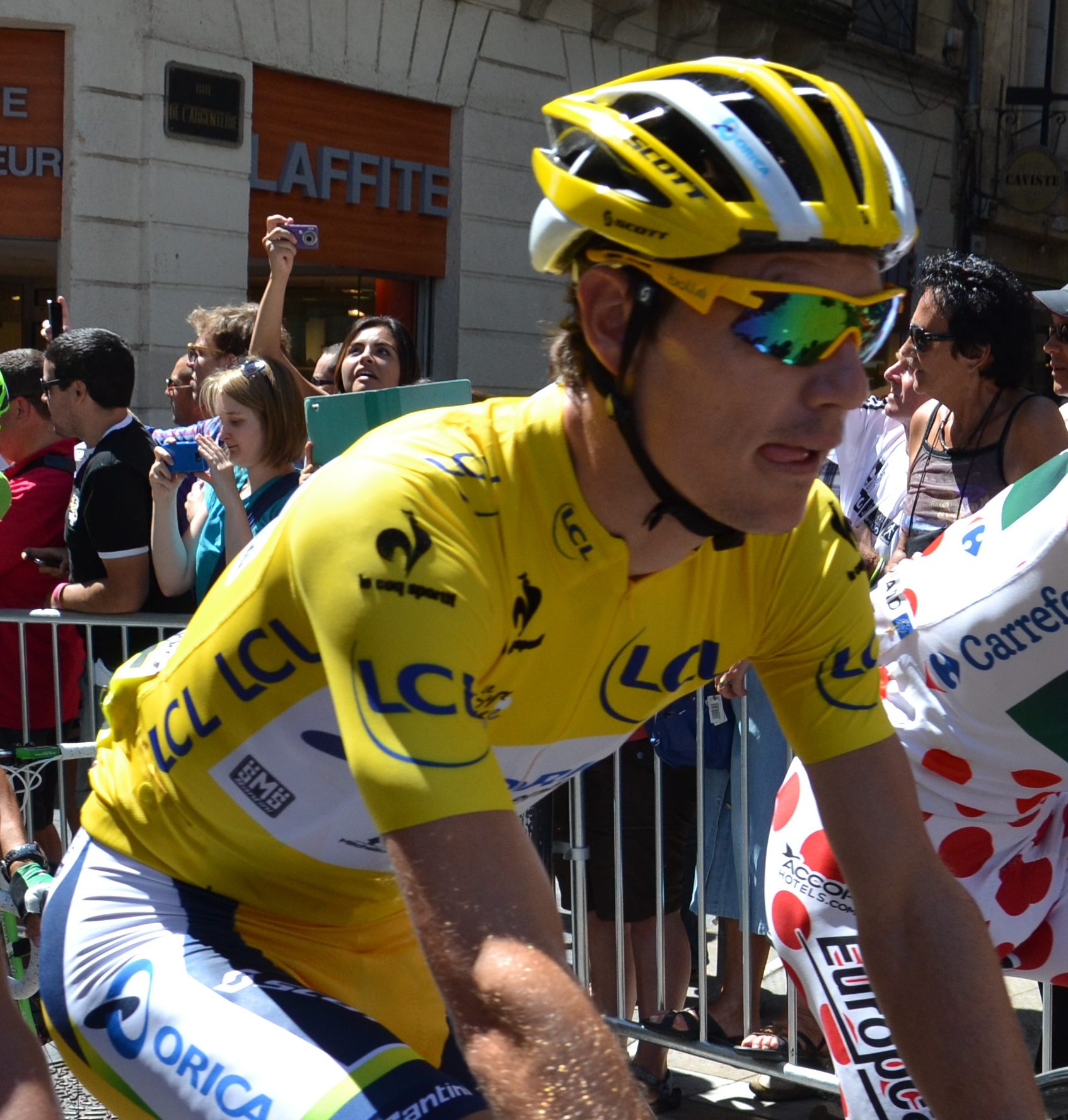
Daryl Impey in the yellow jersey

5 July 2013 — Montpellier to Albi, 205.5 km (127.7 mi)

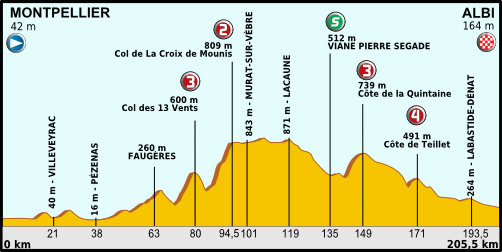
Stage profile

This stage took the riders north-west through the Monts de Lacaune including the climbs of the Col des 13 Vents ("The Pass of 13 Winds") and the Category 2 Col de la Croix de Mounis (809 m (2,654 ft)). After passing the town of Lacaune, the race dropped down over two smaller climbs before the finish in the World Heritage Site city of Albi. Peter Sagan won the stage in a sprint finish.

Stage 7 result

Rank	Rider	Team	Time
1	Peter Sagan (SVK)	Cannondale	4h 54' 12"
2	John Degenkolb (GER)	Argos–Shimano	s.t.
3	Daniele Bennati (ITA)	Saxo–Tinkoff	s.t.
4	Michał Kwiatkowski (POL)	Omega Pharma–Quick-Step	s.t.
5	Edvald Boasson Hagen (NOR)	Team Sky	s.t.
6	Francesco Gavazzi (ITA)	Astana	s.t.
7	Tony Gallopin (FRA)	RadioShack–Leopard	s.t.
8	Arthur Vichot (FRA)	FDJ.fr	s.t.
9	Manuele Mori (ITA)	Lampre–Merida	s.t.
10	Sylvain Chavanel (FRA)	Omega Pharma–Quick-Step	s.t.

General classification after stage 7

Rank	Rider	Team	Time
1	Daryl Impey (RSA)	Orica–GreenEDGE	27h 12' 29"
2	Edvald Boasson Hagen (NOR)	Team Sky	+ 3"
3	Simon Gerrans (AUS)	Orica–GreenEDGE	+ 5"
4	Michael Albasini (SUI)	Orica–GreenEDGE	+ 5"
5	Michał Kwiatkowski (POL)	Omega Pharma–Quick-Step	+ 6"
6	Sylvain Chavanel (FRA)	Omega Pharma–Quick-Step	+ 6"
7	Chris Froome (GBR)	Team Sky	+ 8"
8	Richie Porte (AUS)	Team Sky	+ 8"
9	Nicolas Roche (IRL)	Saxo–Tinkoff	+ 14"
10	Roman Kreuziger (CZE)	Saxo–Tinkoff	+ 14"

== Stage 8 ==
6 July 2013 — Castres to Ax 3 Domaines, 195 km (121.2 mi)

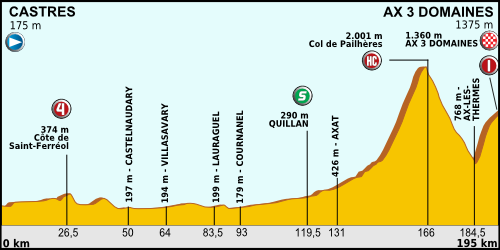
Stage profile

After 120 km (74.6 mi) of flat to start, Stage 8 featured the first mountains of the tour, including the Hors catégorie climb of the Port de Pailhères which, at 2,001 m (6,565 ft), is the highest point reached on the 2013 Tour. The first rider to cross the summit, Movistar Team's Nairo Quintana won the Souvenir Henri Desgrange. The finish was at the Ax 3 Domaines ski resort, at 1,375 m (4,511 ft), with the final climb covering 7.8 km (4.8 mi) and rising 670 m (2,198 ft) at an average gradient of 8.6%. The final climb saw the GC contenders come to the front in this tour's first battle for the maillot jaune.

Johnny Hoogerland (Vacansoleil–DCM) attacked as soon as the flag was dropped and was quickly joined by three other riders: Jean-Marc Marino (Sojasun), Christophe Riblon (Ag2r–La Mondiale), and Rudy Molard (Cofidis). The group opened a gap of roughly nine minutes over the flatter two-thirds of the course and crossed through the sprint point at 117 km (72.7 mi). Back in the peloton, André Greipel (Lotto–Belisol) took the sprint honours ahead of Peter Sagan (Cannondale) and Mark Cavendish (Omega Pharma–Quick-Step).

The race soon reached the base of the Port de Pailhères with the leading group only holding an advantage of under two minutes. Hoogerland attempted to break away from his companions at the 50 km (31.1 mi) to go mark before being brought back. Riblon then launched an attack of his own and built a sizeable lead over his former escape companions. Robert Gesink (Belkin Pro Cycling) was the first rider to attack from the peloton and was followed by an attack from Thomas Voeckler (Team Europcar). At this point, yellow jersey holder Daryl Impey (Orica–GreenEDGE) was dropped.

Quintana launched his own attack with 34 km (21.1 mi) to go; quickly catching and passing Voeckler, Gesink, and Riblon. Pierre Rolland (Team Europcar) and Igor Antón (Euskaltel–Euskadi) attempted to follow, but Quintana built and advantage of 55 seconds over the chasing group at the top of the climb. Rolland would catch Quintana on the bottom of the descent, but was quickly dropped as the riders began the ascent up to Ax 3 Domaines. Riders were continuously shelled from the back of the chasing group until only five riders remained with under 10 km (6.2 mi) to go: Team Sky riders Chris Froome and Richie Porte, Quintana's team-mate Alejandro Valverde and Saxo–Tinkoff pairing Alberto Contador and Roman Kreuziger. Porte and Froome, having built a small gap over the other three riders, soon caught Quintana; thus prompting Froome to launch an attack of his own up the mountain. Froome gradually built a larger advantage all the way to the finish line and into the yellow jersey. Behind, Valverde attempted to chase after Froome, before being passed by Porte who comfortably rode into second place. Contador and Kreuziger struggled behind and were passed by Belkin Pro Cycling duo Bauke Mollema and Laurens ten Dam, and Euskaltel–Euskadi's Mikel Nieve.

Stage 8 result

Rank	Rider	Team	Time
1	Chris Froome (GBR)	Team Sky	5h 03' 18"
2	Richie Porte (AUS)	Team Sky	+ 51"
3	Alejandro Valverde (ESP)	Movistar Team	+ 1' 08"
4	Bauke Mollema (NED)	Belkin Pro Cycling	+ 1' 10"
5	Laurens ten Dam (NED)	Belkin Pro Cycling	+ 1' 16"
6	Mikel Nieve (ESP)	Euskaltel–Euskadi	+ 1' 34"
7	Roman Kreuziger (CZE)	Saxo–Tinkoff	+ 1' 45"
8	Alberto Contador (ESP)	Saxo–Tinkoff	+ 1' 45"
9	Nairo Quintana (COL)	Movistar Team	+ 1' 45"
10	Igor Antón (ESP)	Euskaltel–Euskadi	+ 1' 45"

General classification after stage 8

Rank	Rider	Team	Time
1	Chris Froome (GBR)	Team Sky	32h 15' 55"
2	Richie Porte (AUS)	Team Sky	+ 51"
3	Alejandro Valverde (ESP)	Movistar Team	+ 1' 25"
4	Bauke Mollema (NED)	Belkin Pro Cycling	+ 1' 44"
5	Laurens ten Dam (NED)	Belkin Pro Cycling	+ 1' 50"
6	Roman Kreuziger (CZE)	Saxo–Tinkoff	+ 1' 51"
7	Alberto Contador (ESP)	Saxo–Tinkoff	+ 1' 51"
8	Nairo Quintana (COL)	Movistar Team	+ 2' 02"
9	Joaquim Rodríguez (ESP)	Team Katusha	+ 2' 31"
10	Michael Rogers (AUS)	Saxo–Tinkoff	+ 2' 40"

== Stage 9 ==
7 July 2013 — Saint-Girons to Bagnères-de-Bigorre, 168.5 km (104.7 mi)

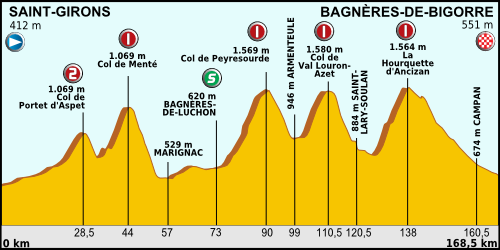
Stage profile

The second stage in the Pyrenees saw the race cross the Category 2 Col de Portet d'Aspet (1,069 m (3,507 ft)) soon after the start, followed by four Category 1 climbs: Col de Menté (1,349 m (4,426 ft)), Col de Peyresourde (1,569 m (5,148 ft)), Col de Val Louron-Azet (1,580 m (5,184 ft)) and La Hourquette d'Ancizan (1,564 m (5,131 ft)). This is a "roller-coaster" stage.

Following Froome and Team Sky's dominating performance at Ax 3 Domaines, Movistar and Garmin attacked from the early stages. Although Chris Froome was able to follow the attacks, Richie Porte's efforts caused him to be dropped by the leaders and eventually lose 10 minutes. As a result, Froome was left isolated for the majority of the stage, having to hold off several attacks from Nairo Quintana on the final climb. A late attack on the final climb by Jakob Fuglsang and Dan Martin was allowed to escape, and the Irish rider held off Fuglsang to win the stage. The rest of the leading riders, minus Porte, finished in a group behind Martin.

Stage 9 result

Rank	Rider	Team	Time
1	Dan Martin (IRL)	Garmin–Sharp	4h 43' 03"
2	Jakob Fuglsang (DEN)	Astana	s.t.
3	Michał Kwiatkowski (POL)	Omega Pharma–Quick-Step	+ 20"
4	Daniel Moreno (ESP)	Team Katusha	+ 20"
5	Joaquim Rodríguez (ESP)	Team Katusha	+ 20"
6	Cadel Evans (AUS)	BMC Racing Team	+ 20"
7	Wout Poels (NED)	Vacansoleil–DCM	+ 20"
8	Bauke Mollema (NED)	Belkin Pro Cycling	+ 20"
9	Daniel Navarro (ESP)	Cofidis	+ 20"
10	Maxime Monfort (BEL)	RadioShack–Leopard	+ 20"

General classification after stage 9

Rank	Rider	Team	Time
1	Chris Froome (GBR)	Team Sky	36h 59' 18"
2	Alejandro Valverde (ESP)	Movistar Team	+ 1' 25"
3	Bauke Mollema (NED)	Belkin Pro Cycling	+ 1' 44"
4	Laurens ten Dam (NED)	Belkin Pro Cycling	+ 1' 50"
5	Roman Kreuziger (CZE)	Saxo–Tinkoff	+ 1' 51"
6	Alberto Contador (ESP)	Saxo–Tinkoff	+ 1' 51"
7	Nairo Quintana (COL)	Movistar Team	+ 2' 02"
8	Dan Martin (IRL)	Garmin–Sharp	+ 2' 28"
9	Joaquim Rodríguez (ESP)	Team Katusha	+ 2' 31"
10	Rui Costa (POR)	Movistar Team	+ 2' 45"

== Stage 10 ==
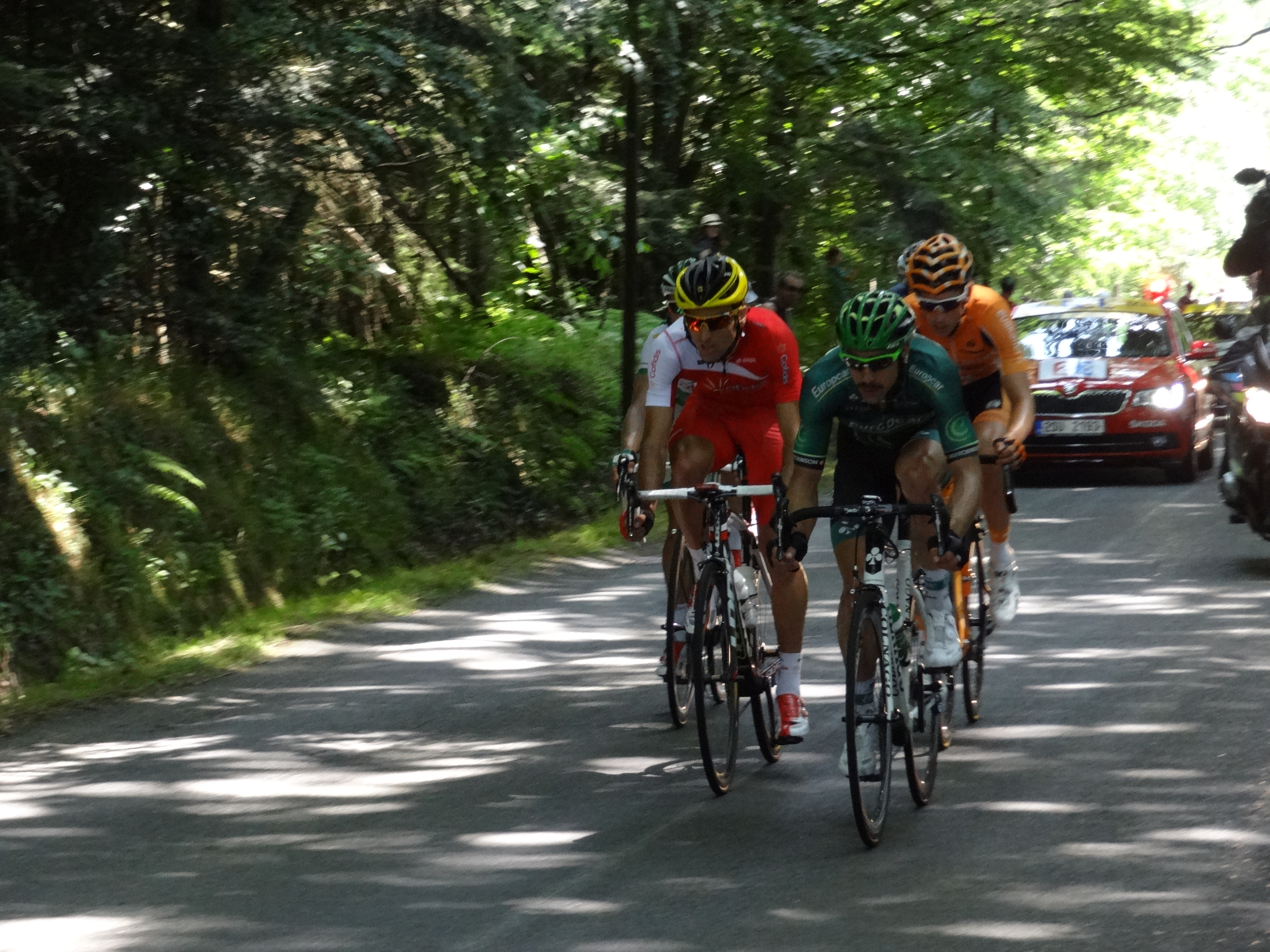
Front group

9 July 2013 — Saint-Gildas-des-Bois to Saint-Malo, 197 km (122.4 mi)

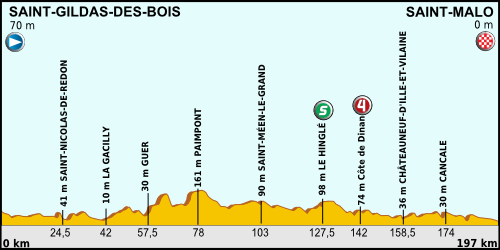
Stage profile

Stage 10 result

Rank	Rider	Team	Time
1	Marcel Kittel (GER)	Argos–Shimano	4h 53' 25"
2	André Greipel (GER)	Lotto–Belisol	s.t.
3	Mark Cavendish (GBR)	Omega Pharma–Quick-Step	s.t.
4	Peter Sagan (SVK)	Cannondale	s.t.
5	William Bonnet (FRA)	FDJ.fr	s.t.
6	Alexander Kristoff (NOR)	Team Katusha	s.t.
7	Samuel Dumoulin (FRA)	Ag2r–La Mondiale	s.t.
8	Kévin Reza (FRA)	Team Europcar	s.t.
9	Danny van Poppel (NED)	Vacansoleil–DCM	s.t.
10	José Joaquín Rojas (ESP)	Movistar Team	s.t.

General classification after stage 10

Rank	Rider	Team	Time
1	Chris Froome (GBR)	Team Sky	41h 52' 43"
2	Alejandro Valverde (ESP)	Movistar Team	+ 1' 25"
3	Bauke Mollema (NED)	Belkin Pro Cycling	+ 1' 44"
4	Laurens ten Dam (NED)	Belkin Pro Cycling	+ 1' 50"
5	Roman Kreuziger (CZE)	Saxo–Tinkoff	+ 1' 51"
6	Alberto Contador (ESP)	Saxo–Tinkoff	+ 1' 51"
7	Nairo Quintana (COL)	Movistar Team	+ 2' 02"
8	Dan Martin (IRL)	Garmin–Sharp	+ 2' 28"
9	Joaquim Rodríguez (ESP)	Team Katusha	+ 2' 31"
10	Rui Costa (POR)	Movistar Team	+ 2' 45"

== Stage 11 ==
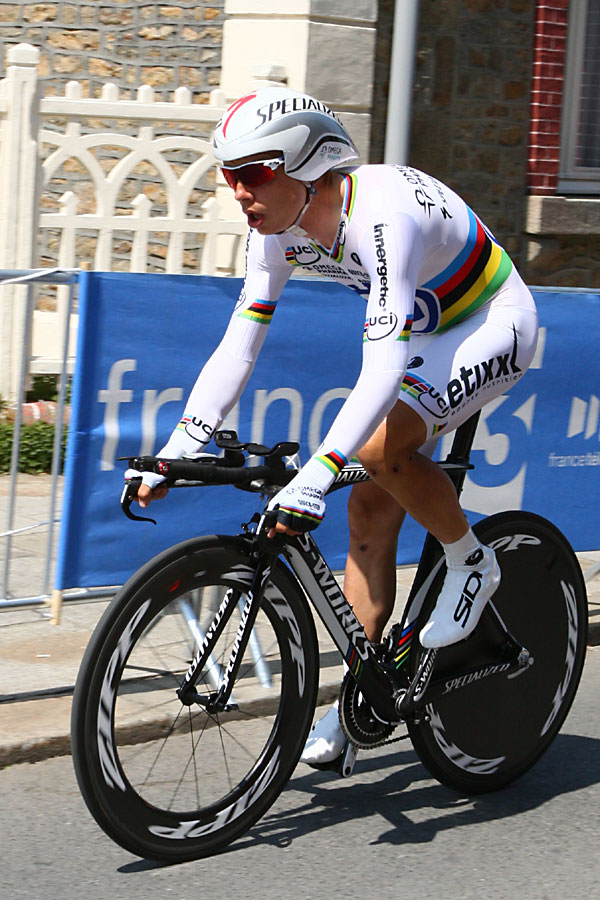
Stage winner Tony Martin

10 July 2013 — Avranches to Mont Saint-Michel, 33 km (20.5 mi), individual time trial (ITT)

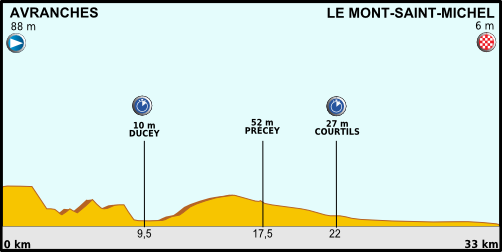
Stage profile

Stage 11 result

Rank	Rider	Team	Time
1	Tony Martin (GER)	Omega Pharma–Quick-Step	36' 29"
2	Chris Froome (GBR)	Team Sky	+ 12"
3	Thomas De Gendt (BEL)	Vacansoleil–DCM	+ 1' 01"
4	Richie Porte (AUS)	Team Sky	+ 1' 21"
5	Michał Kwiatkowski (POL)	Omega Pharma–Quick-Step	+ 1' 31"
6	Svein Tuft (CAN)	Orica–GreenEDGE	+ 1' 35"
7	Sylvain Chavanel (FRA)	Omega Pharma–Quick-Step	+ 1' 37"
8	Jérémy Roy (FRA)	FDJ.fr	+ 1' 43"
9	Tom Dumoulin (NED)	Argos–Shimano	+ 1' 45"
10	Jonathan Castroviejo (ESP)	Movistar Team	+ 1' 52"

General classification after stage 11

Rank	Rider	Team	Time
1	Chris Froome (GBR)	Team Sky	42h 29' 24"
2	Alejandro Valverde (ESP)	Movistar Team	+ 3' 25"
3	Bauke Mollema (NED)	Belkin Pro Cycling	+ 3' 37"
4	Alberto Contador (ESP)	Saxo–Tinkoff	+ 3' 54"
5	Roman Kreuziger (CZE)	Saxo–Tinkoff	+ 3' 57"
6	Laurens ten Dam (NED)	Belkin Pro Cycling	+ 4' 10"
7	Michał Kwiatkowski (POL)	Omega Pharma–Quick-Step	+ 4' 44"
8	Nairo Quintana (COL)	Movistar Team	+ 5' 18"
9	Rui Costa (POR)	Movistar Team	+ 5' 37"
10	Jean-Christophe Péraud (FRA)	Ag2r–La Mondiale	+ 5' 39"
