= Abe Lincoln (musician) =

American jazz trombonist (1907-2000)

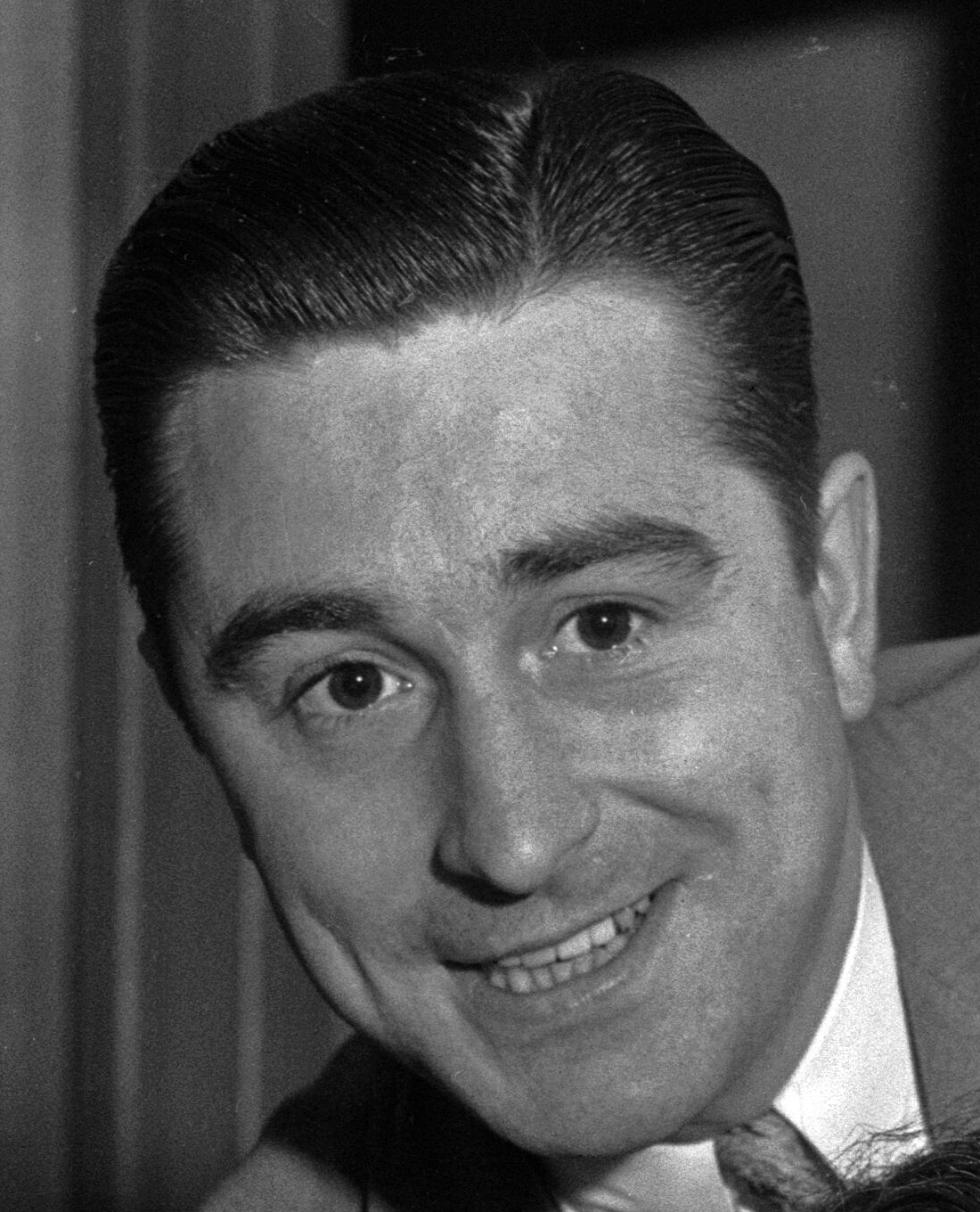
- Lincoln in 1935

Background information
- Born: March 29, 1907; Lancaster, Pennsylvania, U.S.
- Died: June 8, 2000 (aged 93); Van Nuys, Los Angeles, California, U.S.
- Genres: Jazz, Dixieland
- Instruments: Trombone

Abram Lincoln (March 29, 1907 – June 8, 2000) was an American jazz trombonist. He never led his own recording session, though he recorded copiously as a sideman.

== Early life ==
Lincoln was born in Lancaster, Pennsylvania, one of six brothers. He began playing trombone aged five, instructed by his cornet playing father, John. His older brother Bud, would also become a professional musician, as would brothers Roy and Chet.

== Career ==
Lincoln began working professionally in the early 1920s. In the 1920s and 1930s, he spent time playing with Adrian Rollini's California Ramblers (and was the replacement trombonist for Tommy Dorsey), as well as with Arthur Lange, Ace Brigode, Roger Wolfe Kahn, Paul Whiteman, and Ozzie Nelson.

As a studio musician, Abe most prominently performed occasional solos and dixieland-stylings during the musical portions on the Old Time radio and Fibber McGee and Molly. He also played with the Billy Mills Orchestra.

In the 1930s and into the 1940s, he worked primarily in Los Angeles studios as a sideman. During the Dixieland revival, his career saw a resurgence, playing with Wingy Manone, the Rampart Street Paraders, Red Nichols, Bob Scobey, Pete Fountain, Jack Teagarden, and Matty Matlock.

Lincoln played his trombone for music and sound effects "for Walter Lantz Woody Woodpecker cartoons and some Buster Keaton comedies".

He recorded with Bill Davison and did freelance work into the 1970s. He retired around 1980, but still occasionally performed at weddings and other special occasions.

== Personal life ==
Lincoln married Isabelle Welch in early 1929. They had four children: Abe Jr, Joyce, Lois and Robert.

He was a resident of Van Nuys. from 1939 until his death. He died there in 2000.
