= Ace Brigode =

American dance band leader popular in the 1920s

Athos C. "Ace" Brigode (January 5, 1893 – February 3, 1960) was a United States dance band leader who enjoyed his greatest popularity in the 1920s.

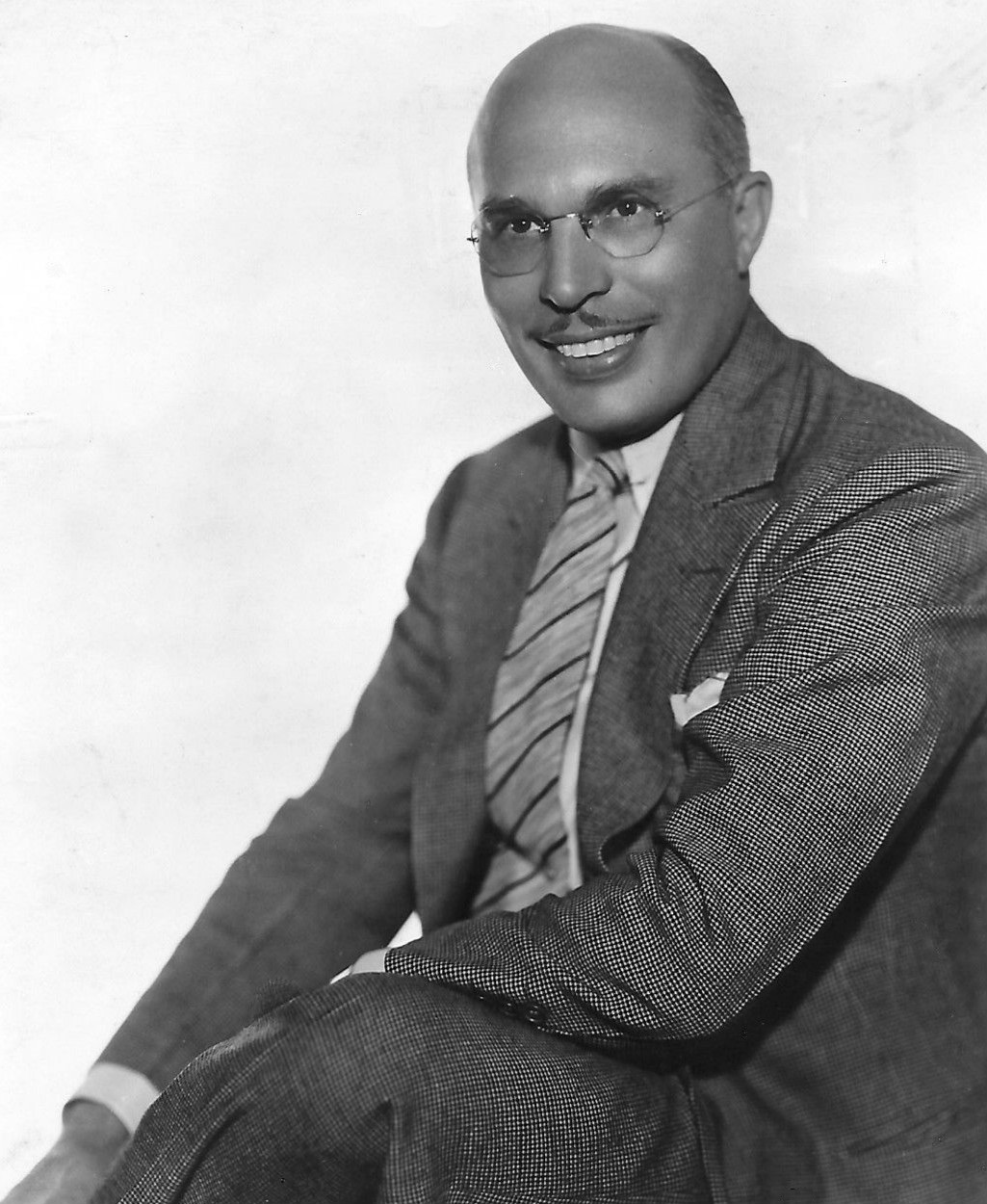
Ace Brigode in 1938.

Ace Brigode was born in Illinois. He entered show business as a member of a touring minstrel show. His band began playing professionally in early 1921 as "Ace Brigode & His 10 Virginians"; a bit later they were renamed "Ace Brigode & His 14 Virginians"; this name stuck although the band varied between having 9 to 19 members over the years. The band played in the moderately jazz-influenced peppy dance band style called "Collegiate Hot" that to many people exemplifies the music of the "Roaring Twenties". The most noted musician who played with Brigode was trombonist Abe Lincoln.

Brigode hosted the "White Rose Gasoline Show" on radio, featuring his band. The band also made gramophone records for various record labels, including OKeh, Edison, Cameo and Pathé Records; their biggest hit was a 1925 version of "Yes Sir, That's My Baby" for Columbia Records. The band's theme song was "Carry Me Back to Old Virginny". Dwight Eisenhower was among the band's fans.

Brigode himself played violin and clarinet, but mostly acted as master of ceremonies. The band toured widely around the United States. Brigode kept the band current with newer style arrangements into the early swing music era, before disbanding the group in 1946.

After this Ace Brigode worked as promotions manager for Cleveland, Ohio's Chippewa Lake Park, and also did television commercial voice work. Brigode refused to book rock and roll performers into the park because of his dislike for the musical genre. He was survived by his wife, Theresa, sons Robert and Richard, and a daughter, Mrs. James Knott.

== See also ==
- Ace Brigode Recordings
