= Ax 3 Domaines =

Winter sports resort in the French Pyrenees

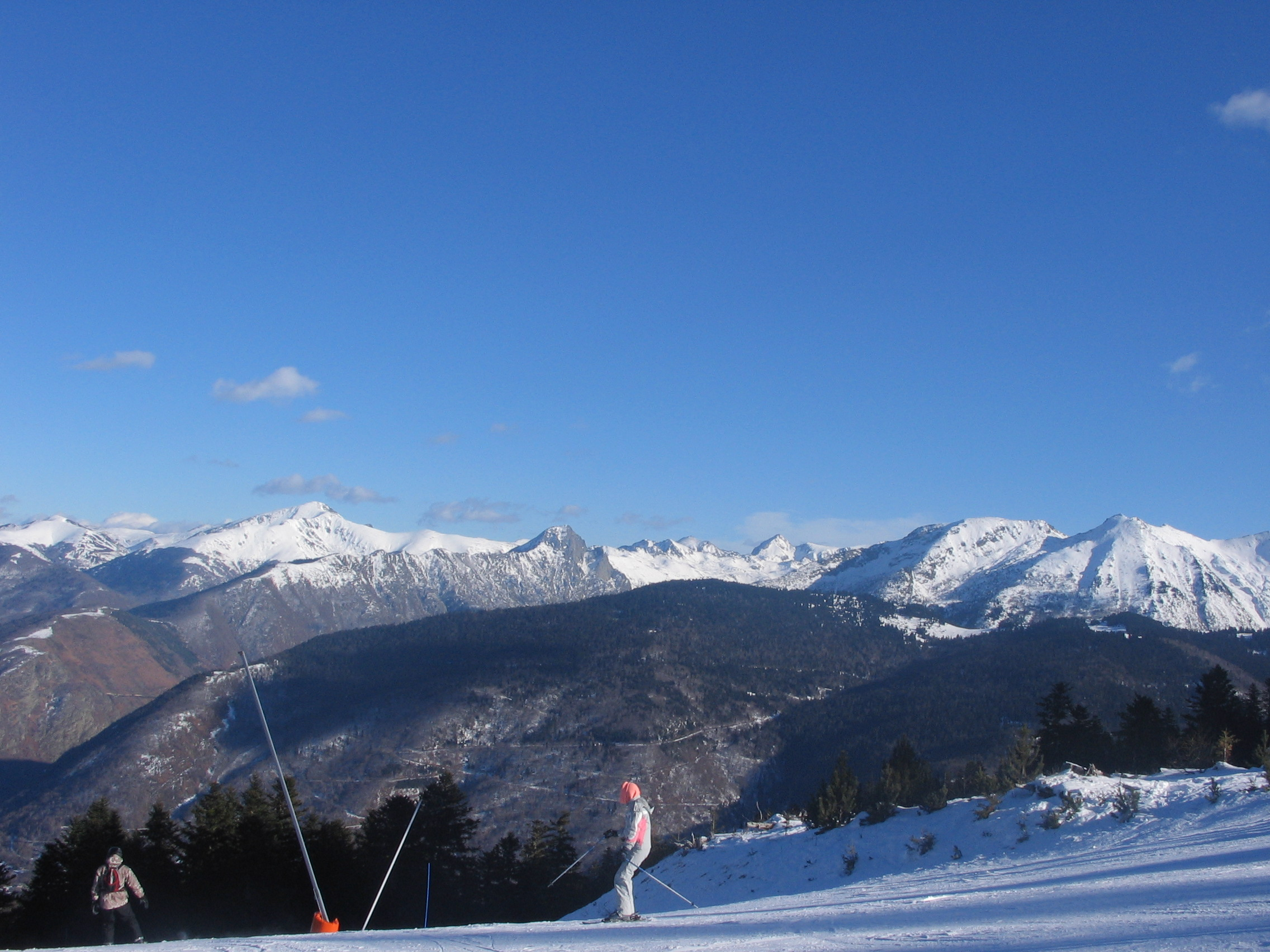
- The blue piste "Bonascre" at Ax 3 Domaines

- Location within France Location within Occitanie Location within Pyrenees
- Location: Ax-les-Thermes, Ariège, Occitania, France
- Nearest major city: Andorra la Vella
- Coordinates: 42°42′03″N 1°48′50″E
- Top elevation: 2,400 m (7,900 ft)
- Base elevation: 1,400 m (4,600 ft)
- Trails: 17
- Website: www.ax-ski.com

Ax 3 Domaines is a winter sports resort situated in the commune of Ax-les-Thermes, the department of Ariège and the Occitania region of France. Since 2001, the climb to the ski station has been used as a stage finish in the Tour de France cycle race.

On 6 July 2013, the eighth stage of the Tour de France finished in the resort at an altitude of 1,375 m (4,511 ft).

== Tour de France stage finishes ==
Year	Stage	Start of stage	Distance (km)	Category	Stage winner	Yellow Jersey
2013	8	Castres	195	1	Chris Froome (GBR)	Chris Froome (GBR)
2010	14	Revel	184.5	1	Christophe Riblon (FRA)	Andy Schleck (LUX)
2005	14	Agde	220.5	1	Georg Totschnig (AUT)	~~Lance Armstrong (USA)~~
2003	13	Toulouse	197.5	1	Carlos Sastre (ESP)	~~Lance Armstrong (USA)~~
2001	12	Perpignan	166.5	1	Félix Cárdenas (COL)	François Simon (FRA)
