= Christophe Riblon =

French cyclist (born 1981)

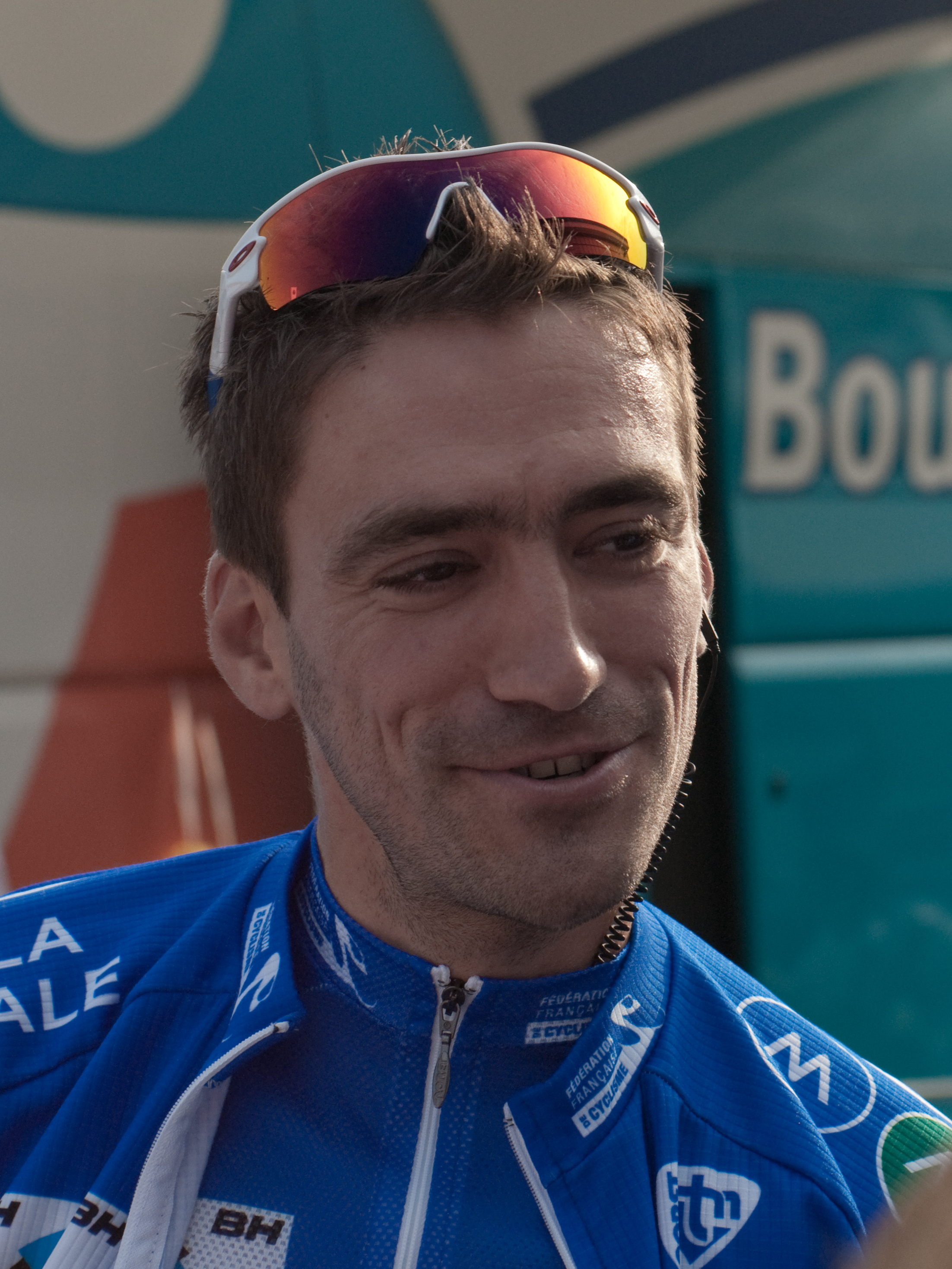
- Riblon at the 2009 UCI Road World Championships

Personal information
- Full name: Christophe Riblon
- Born: 17 January 1981 (age 45) Tremblay-en-France, France
- Height: 1.80 m (5 ft 11 in)
- Weight: 65 kg (143 lb; 10.2 st)

Cycling career
- Sport: Cycling
- Disciplines: Road and track
- Role: Rider
- Rider type: Puncheur (road); Endurance (track)

Professional team
- 2005–2017: AG2R Prévoyance

Major wins
- Grand Tours Tour de France 2 individual stages (2010, 2013) Combativity award (2013)
Medal record
Men's track cycling
Representing France
World Championships
Silver medal – second place	2008 Manchester	Points race
Silver medal – second place	2010 Ballerup	Madison

Christophe Riblon (French pronunciation: [kʁistɔf ʁiblɔ̃]; born 17 January 1981) is a French former road and track racing cyclist who competed as a professional for the AG2R La Mondiale team for 13 seasons between 2005 and 2017. He also competed for France at the 2008 Summer Olympics.

== Career ==
Born in Tremblay-en-France, Seine-Saint-Denis, Riblon won two mountain-top finishes of the Tour de France, including stage 14 of the 2010 Tour de France at the ski resort of Ax-3 Domaines in the Pyrenees, and stage 18 of the 2013 Tour de France at Alpe d'Huez.

During his 2010 victory, he was part of the early breakaway that went free 30 kilometres (19 mi) into the race, and he crested the penultimate climb of the day alone, the Port de Pailheres. He had a two-minute lead at the foot of the last climb, and held on to win solo as the general classification contenders were battling it out behind him.

He won his 2013 stage following a long breakaway, chasing down Tejay van Garderen over the second ascent of Alpe d'Huez and holding on to win by a minute, despite crashing into a ditch on the descent of the Col de Sarenne. In doing so he became the race's first (and only) French winner of a stage that year.

== Major results ==
2001
8th Grand Prix de la ville de Pérenchies
2004
1st Road race, National Amateur Road Championships
2005
2nd Overall Tour de l'Avenir
8th Tartu GP
10th Overall Tour du Poitou-Charentes
2006
5th GP Plumelec-Morbihan
7th Overall Circuit de Lorraine

1st Stage 4

2007
1st Tour de la Somme
2nd Duo Normand (with Émilien-Benoît Bergès)
2008
2nd Points race, UCI Track World Championships
2009
1st Stage 3 Route du Sud
6th Clásica de San Sebastián
2010
1st Stage 14 Tour de France
1st Les Boucles du Sud Ardèche
2nd Madison (with Morgan Kneisky), UCI Track World Championships
5th Overall Circuit de la Sarthe
5th Overall Bayern-Rundfahrt
7th Overall Critérium du Dauphiné
2011
2nd Time trial, National Road Championships
7th Tour du Doubs
8th Overall Tour de Pologne
10th Overall Tour du Poitou-Charentes
2012
9th Overall Tirreno–Adriatico
9th Les Boucles du Sud Ardèche
10th Overall Critérium International
2013
Tour de France

1st Stage 18
Combativity award Stage 18 & Overall

3rd Overall Tour de Pologne

1st Stage 2

2014
4th Overall Tour de Pologne
2015
7th Overall Tour de Pologne

=== Grand Tour general classification results timeline ===
Grand Tour	2007	2008	2009	2010	2011	2012	2013	2014	2015	2016
Giro d'Italia	82	—	—	—	—	—	—	—	—	—
Tour de France	—	137	82	28	51	73	37	120	68	—
Vuelta a España	—	—	46	130	—	162	—	—	—	153

Legend
—	Did not compete
DNF	Did not finish

=== Other major stage races ===
Race	2006	2007	2008	2009	2010	2011	2012	2013	2014	2015	2016	2017
Paris–Nice	—	—	—	DNF	20	85	—	—	—	—	—	—
Tirreno–Adriatico	—	—	—	—	—	—	9	—	—	DNF	98	—
Volta a Catalunya	—	—	80	—	-	148	—	—	—	—	—	—
Tour of the Basque Country	—	—	—	DNF	—	—	18	68	113	—	OTL	—
Tour de Romandie	—	—	—	—	32	—	—	—	—	—	91	119
Critérium du Dauphiné	—	—	91	—	7	51	86	—	—	DNF	—	—
Tour de Suisse	DNF	43	—	—	—	—	—	49	DNF	—	76	—
