= Ted King (cyclist) =

American cyclist (born 1983)

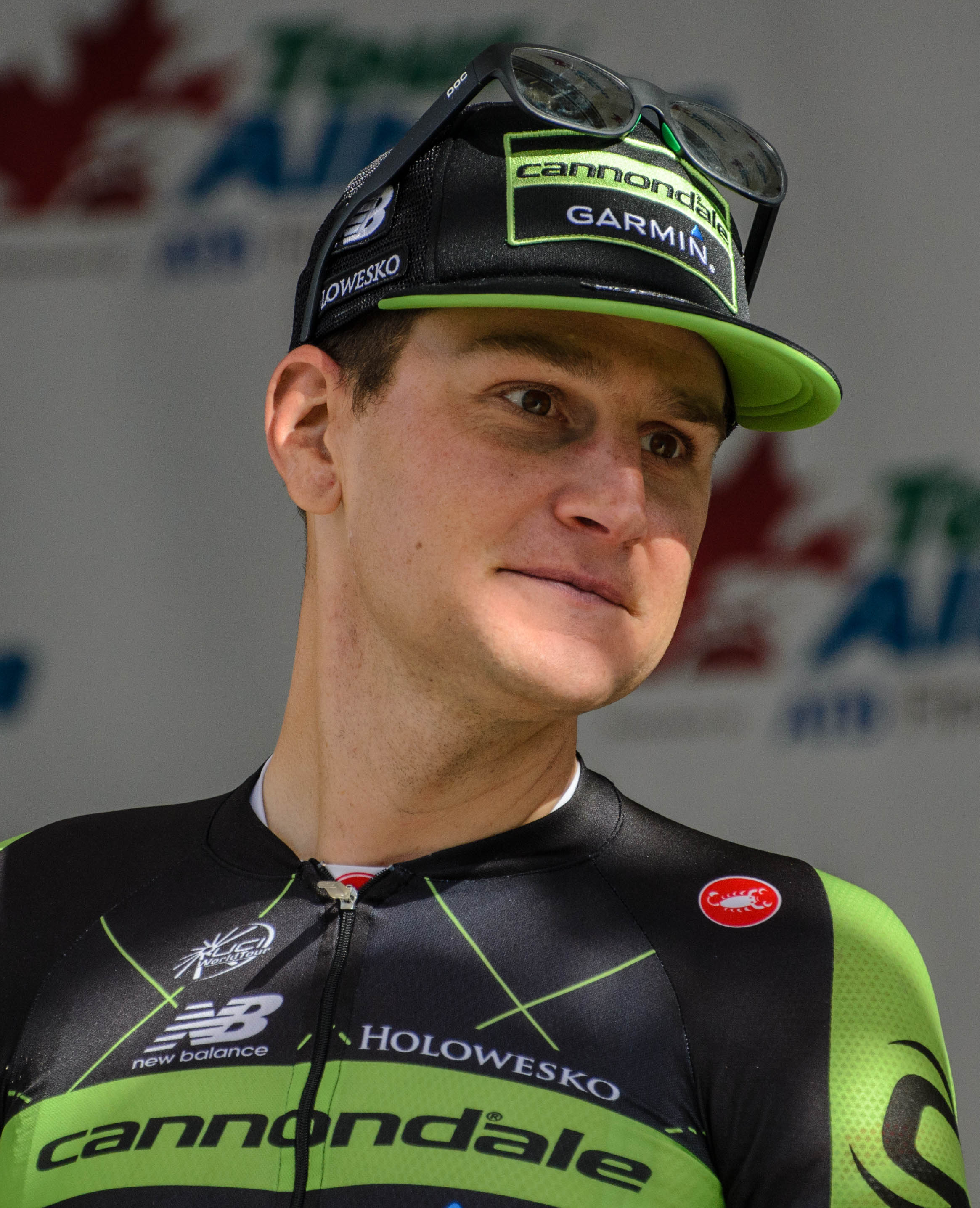
- King at the 2015 Tour of Alberta

Personal information
- Full name: Edward Carrington King
- Born: January 31, 1983 (age 43) Exeter, New Hampshire, United States
- Height: 1.89 m (6 ft 2 in)
- Weight: 78 kg (172 lb)

Cycling career
- Sport: Cycling
- Current team: Retired
- Discipline: Road
- Role: Rider
- Rider type: Domestique

Amateur teams
- 2002: Bath BikeMan
- 2003–2005: Louis Garneau Racing

Professional teams
- 2006–2008: Priority Health
- 2009–2010: Cervélo TestTeam
- 2011–2014: Liquigas–Cannondale
- 2015: Cannondale–Garmin

Edward Carrington King (born January 31, 1983) is a retired American professional road racing cyclist who last rode for UCI ProTeam Cannondale–Garmin. King turned professional in 2006 and raced for ten years, retiring from contemporary road racing in 2015. He quickly segued to the burgeoning world of gravel cycling, where he has been a pioneer in the world of competitive gravel racing.

== Personal ==
Born in Exeter, New Hampshire, King spent his adolescence in Brentwood, New Hampshire, United States. In 2005, he graduated from Middlebury College in Middlebury, Vermont, United States where he studied economics and mathematics. During his career King resided in both Girona, Catalonia, Spain and Lucca, Italy. Though he shares a surname with several other professional cyclists, in the pro peloton Ted only shares family relation to his older brother Robert "Robbie" King, who was a professional cyclist from 2006 to 2008. King's father, also Ted King, was an orthopaedic surgeon practicing in Exeter for 25 years before suffering a stroke in 2003. The elder King is now a member of the Krempels Center, an organization in Portsmouth, New Hampshire dedicated to improving the lives of those living with brain injury.

In 2011, the two King brothers helped create the King Challenge, an annual benefit bike ride in Stratham, New Hampshire, which as of the ninth edition in 2019 has generated more than one-million dollars for the Krempels Center. Ted is now an ambassador for the general sport of cycling, working with long time sponsors to get more people more excited about riding a bike, racing a bike, and spending time on a bike.

Ted is a co-founder of UnTapped, a sports nutrition founded in Richmond, Vermont based on the nutritional merits of maple syrup. UnTapped sells energy gels, stroopwafels, and hydration drink mix, all using maple syrup and maple sugar as the carbohydrate base.

== Career ==
Between 2006 and 2008, he competed with Priority Health, a UCI ConTeam. King signed with Cervélo TestTeam, a UCI ProConTeam, for the 2009 and 2010 seasons. He signed with Liquigas–Cannondale, a UCI ProTeam, for the 2011 and 2012 seasons. He remained with Cannondale for the 2013 and 2014 seasons. King is a domestique having raced for Thor Hushovd, Carlos Sastre, and most notably spending four years alongside Peter Sagan.

King was controversially disqualified from the 2013 Tour de France. The disqualification was a result of finishing seven seconds outside the elimination time on Stage 4. King had been involved in a crash on Stage 1 in the lead up to the sprint finale for his teammate Peter Sagan; the crash resulted in a separated shoulder and broken scapula among other injuries for King. He continued on for three more stages before finishing outside that time limit, as a result he was not able to start the next day.

King rode the 2014 Tour de France, but withdrew on Stage 10 due to injuries he sustained in Stage 1.

King signed with Cannondale–Garmin, a UCI ProTeam, for the 2015 season. He retired from road racing after the 2015 season.

Beginning in early 2016, King quickly became a leader in the sport of gravel cycling. Twice a winner of Dirty Kanza, in 2016 and 2018, he has won or finished on the podium of most of the major gravel races.

== Career achievements ==
=== Major results ===
2006
2nd Overall International Tour de Toona

1st Young rider classification

6th Overall Fitchburg Longsjo Classic
6th Univest Grand Prix
2007
4th Overall Tour de Leelanau
2008
3rd Overall Fitchburg Longsjo Classic
3rd Overall Tour de Leelanau
5th Overall Nature Valley Grand Prix
2011
3rd National Road Race Championships
2013
7th National Road Race Championships
2016
1st Dirty Kanza 200
2018
1st Dirty Kanza 200
2019
1st SBTGRVL
8th Overall Dirty Kanza 200
2021
4th Unbound Gravel 200

=== Grand Tour general classification results timeline ===
Grand Tour	2009	2010	2011	2012	2013	2014	2015
Giro d'Italia	106	114	—	—	—	—	—
Tour de France	—	—	—	—	DSQ	DNF	—
Vuelta a España	—	—	—	—	—	—	—

Legend
DSQ	Disqualified
DNF	Did not finish
