= Teddy King =

English footballer

Personal information
- Date of birth: 7 July 1884
- Place of birth: Leicester, England
- Date of death: 1952 (aged 67–68)
- Height: 5 ft 9 in (1.75 m)
- Position: Wing half

Senior career*
Years	Team	Apps	(Gls)
1906?–1922?	Leicester Fosse/City	227	(26)
- * Club domestic league appearances and goals

Edwin "Teddy" King (7 July 1884 – 1952) was a footballer who played for Leicester City in the Football League, either side of World War I. He played as a wing half, and joined Leicester Fosse (as City were then called) after playing for a number of local sides.

He made a total of 236 senior appearances for Leicester, plus another 121 wartime appearances.

He also played first-class cricket for Leicestershire in two matches in the 1925 season, playing as a wicketkeeper.
