= 2013 Tour de France =

Grand Tour cycling race in 2013

2013 UCI World Tour, race 18 of 29
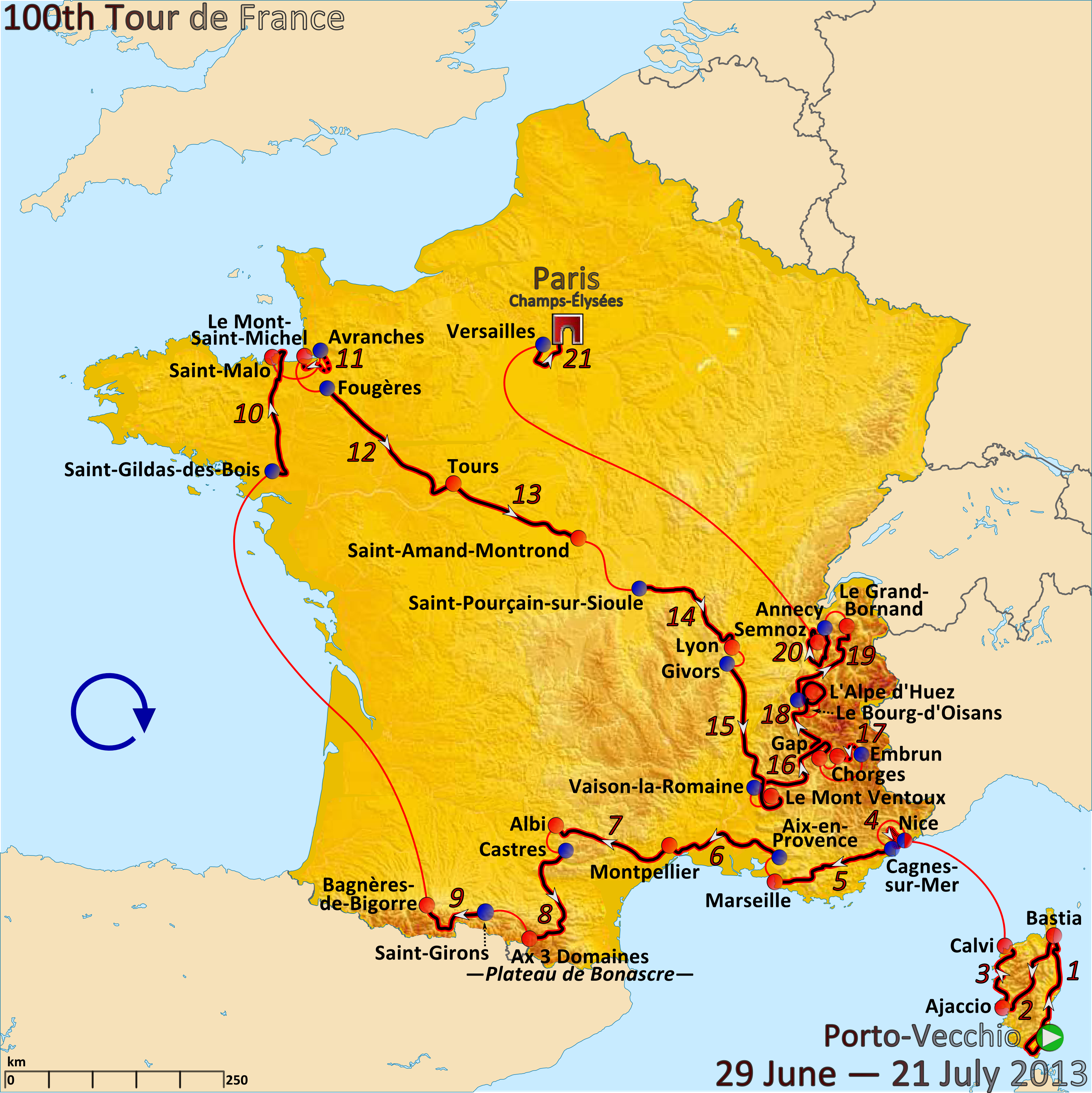
- Route of the 2013 Tour de France

Race details
- Dates: 29 June – 21 July 2013
- Stages: 21
- Distance: 3,403.5 km (2,114.8 mi)
- Winning time: 83h 56' 40"

Results
Jersey awarded to the overall winner	Winner	Chris Froome (GBR)	(Team Sky)
	Second	Nairo Quintana (COL)	(Movistar Team)
	Third	Joaquim Rodríguez (ESP)	(Team Katusha)
Jersey awarded to the points classification winner	Points	Peter Sagan (SVK)	(Cannondale)
Jersey awarded to the mountains classification winner	Mountains	Nairo Quintana (COL)	(Movistar Team)
Jersey awarded to the young rider classification winner	Young rider	Nairo Quintana (COL)	(Movistar Team)
Jersey awarded to the combativity classification winner	Combativity	Christophe Riblon (FRA)	(Ag2r–La Mondiale)
Jersey awarded to the team classification winner	Team	(Denmark) Saxo–Tinkoff	

The 2013 Tour de France was the 100th edition of the Tour de France, one of cycling's Grand Tours. It started on the island of Corsica on 29 June and finished on the Champs-Élysées in Paris on 21 July. The Tour consisted of twenty-one stages and covered a total distance of 3,403.5 km (2,115 mi). The overall general classification was won by Chris Froome of Team Sky. Second and third respectively were Nairo Quintana (Movistar Team) and the Team Katusha rider Joaquim Rodríguez.

Marcel Kittel (Argos–Shimano) was the first rider to wear the general classification leader's yellow jersey after winning stage one. He lost the lead the next day to Jan Bakelants of RadioShack–Leopard, who managed to obtain a one-second lead from a late solo attack. Simon Gerrans gained the race lead after his team, Orica–GreenEDGE, won the stage four team time trial. Gerrans passed the lead on to teammate Daryl Impey after the fifth stage. Froome took the lead from Impey after a dominant performance in the eighth stage, the first classified as mountainous. Froome maintained his lead for the remainder of the race by consolidating his lead through solid performances in the individual time trials and another dominant win on Mont Ventoux, while defending his GC lead in the mountains of the final week from his nearest challenger, the white jersey and eventual King of the mountains, Nairo Quintana.

Froome became the second consecutive British cyclist to win the Tour de France, after Bradley Wiggins accomplished the feat the year before. In the race's other classifications, Movistar Team rider Quintana took the mountains classification with a summit victory in the final mountain stage edging out Froome, and also finished as the best young rider in the general classification, finishing in second place overall; Peter Sagan of the Cannondale team was the winner of the points classification, with Saxo–Tinkoff finishing as the winners of the team classification. Christophe Riblon (Ag2r–La Mondiale) was given the award for the most combative rider. Kittel won the most stages, with four.

== Teams ==
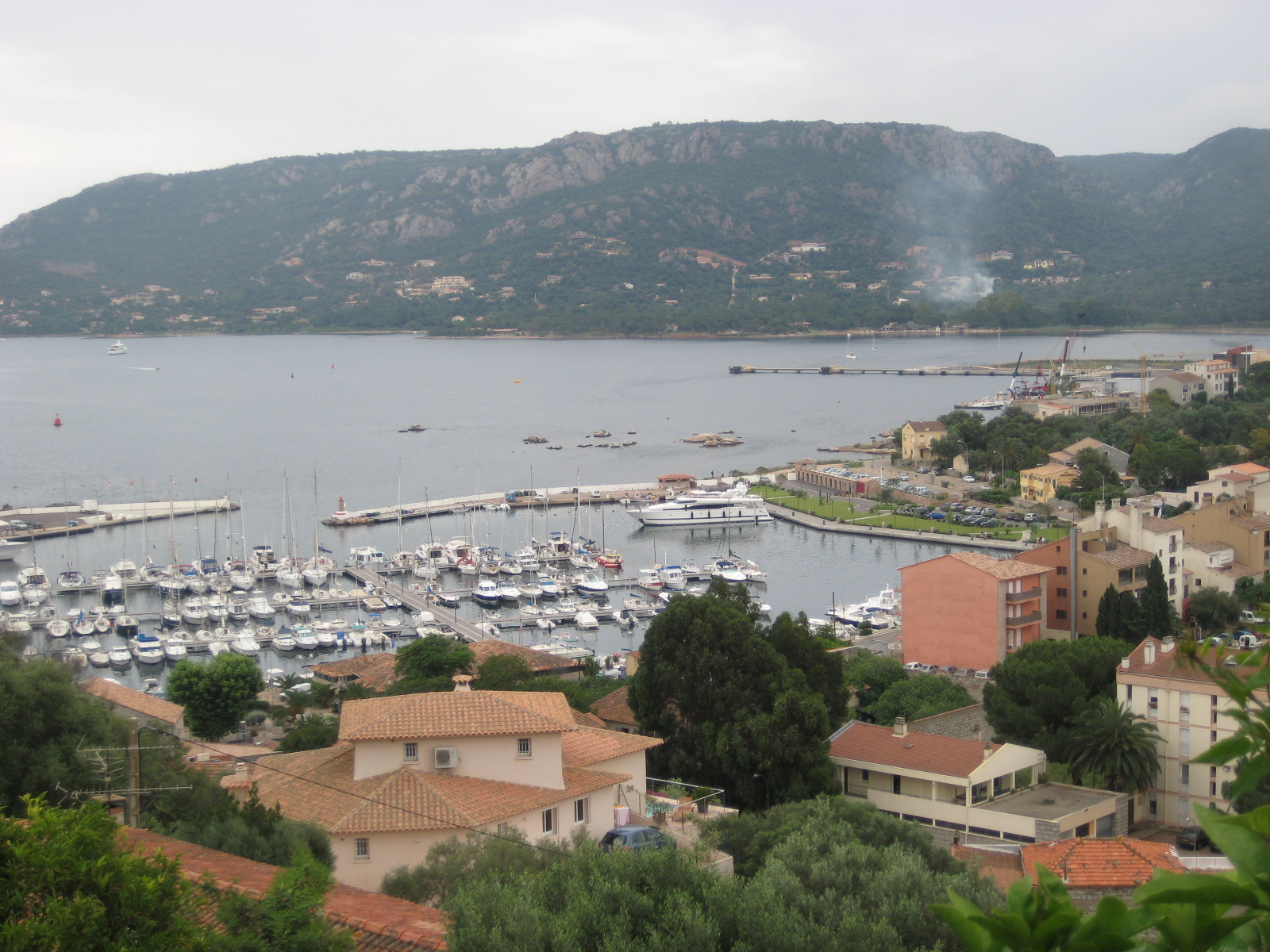
The team presentation ceremony took place on 27 June at the harbour of Porto-Vecchio on the island of Corsica.

Twenty-two teams participated in the 2013 edition of the Tour de France. The race was the 18th of the 29 events in the UCI World Tour, and all of its nineteen UCI ProTeams were entitled, and obliged, to enter the race. On 27 April 2013, the organiser of the Tour, Amaury Sport Organisation (ASO), announced the three second-tier UCI Professional Continental teams given wildcard invitations, all of which were French-based. The presentation of the teams took place at the harbour of Porto-Vecchio on the island of Corsica on 27 June, two days before the opening stage held in the town. Each team arrived by boat to the stage, before being introduced to the crowd.

Each squad was allowed a maximum of nine riders, therefore the start list contained a total of 198 riders. Of these, 54 were riding the Tour de France for the first time. The riders came from 34 countries; France, Spain, Italy, Netherlands, Australia, Belgium and Germany all had 10 or more riders in the race. Riders from ten countries won stages during the race; German riders won the largest number of stages, with six. The average age of riders in the race was 29.45 years, ranging from the 19-year-old Danny van Poppel (Vacansoleil–DCM) to the 41-year-old Jens Voigt (RadioShack–Leopard). Of the total average ages, Cannondale was the youngest team and Saxo–Tinkoff the oldest.

The teams entering the race were:

UCI ProTeams

- Ag2r–La Mondiale
- Argos–Shimano
- Astana
- Belkin Pro Cycling
- BMC Racing Team
- Cannondale
- Euskaltel–Euskadi
- FDJ.fr
- Garmin–Sharp
- Team Katusha
- Lampre–Merida
- Lotto–Belisol
- Movistar Team
- Omega Pharma–Quick-Step
- Orica–GreenEDGE
- RadioShack–Leopard
- Saxo–Tinkoff
- Team Sky
- Vacansoleil–DCM

UCI Professional Continental teams

- Cofidis
- Team Europcar
- Sojasun

== Pre-race favourites ==
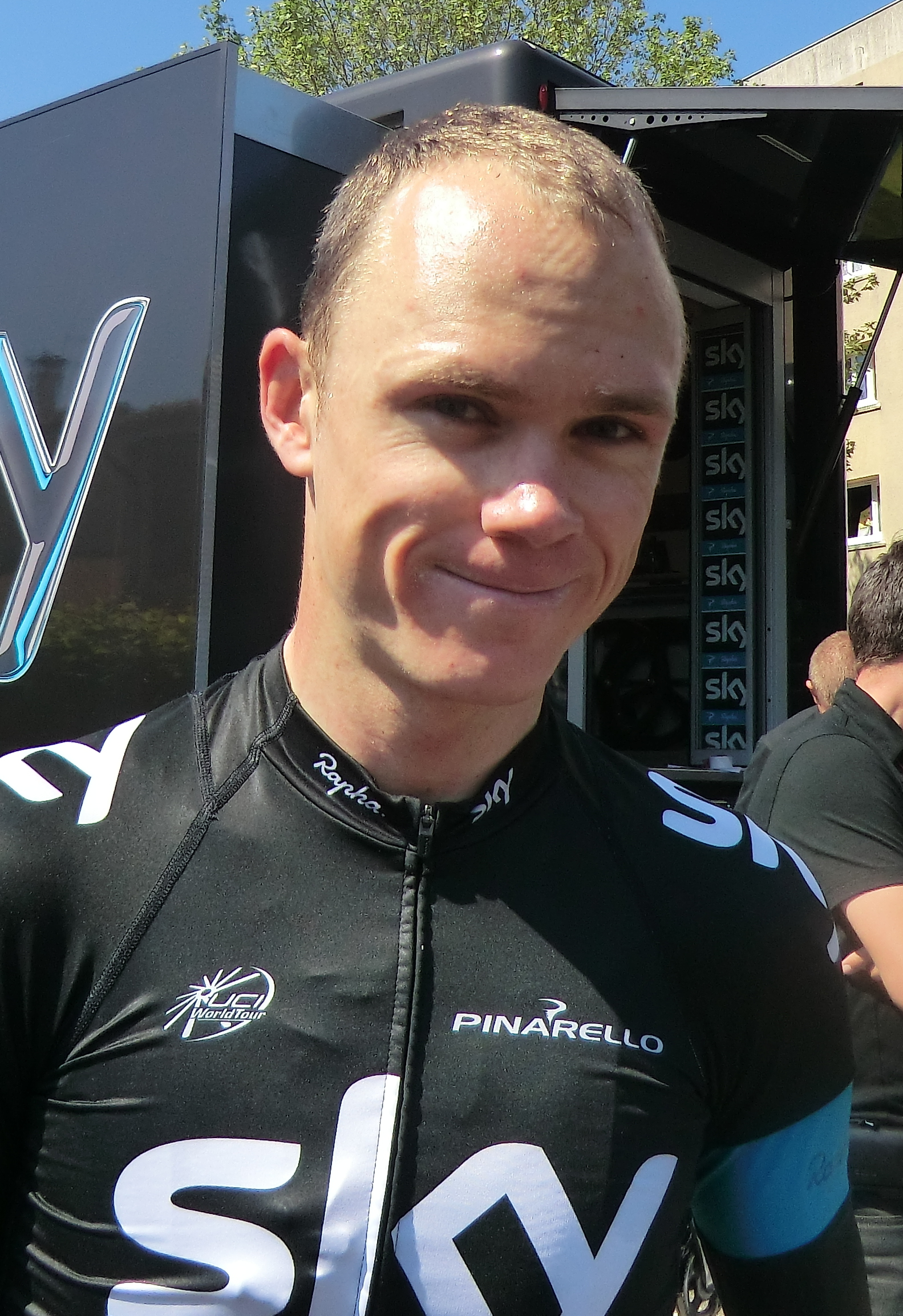
Team Sky's Chris Froome was widely seen as the leading contender for the general classification.

In the run up to the 2013 Tour de France, Chris Froome (Team Sky) was widely considered as the top pre-race favourite for the general classification, with his closest rivals thought to be Alberto Contador (Saxo–Tinkoff) and Joaquim Rodríguez (Team Katusha). Astana's Vincenzo Nibali was also a possible contender after getting his first Tour podium in 2012 but he had focused on the 2013 Giro d'Italia. The other riders considered contenders for the general classification were BMC Racing Team riders Cadel Evans and Tejay van Garderen, Richie Porte (Team Sky), Jurgen Van den Broeck (Lotto–Belisol), Thibaut Pinot (FDJ.fr), Ryder Hesjedal (Garmin–Sharp), Robert Gesink (Belkin Pro Cycling), and Movistar Team riders Alejandro Valverde and Nairo Quintana.

The 2012 Tour de France winner, Bradley Wiggins of Team Sky, had focused on the Giro d'Italia, but retired early due to illness, subsequently pulling out because illness and injury had left him insufficient time to train for the Tour de France and chose not to ride. This left Froome, runner-up in 2012, the undisputed leader of Team Sky. He had shown his form so far in 2013 season by winning four of the five stage races he had ridden: Tour of Oman, Critérium International, Tour de Romandie and Critérium du Dauphiné. Two-time Tour winner (2007 and 2009) Contador returned to the race having been suspended from the 2012 race; he had won the 2012 Vuelta a España and his best major result of the season was second in Oman. Rodríguez had podium finishes in both the Giro and Vuelta in 2012, as well as winning the UCI World Tour. He had top-ten placings in three major stage races in the season.

The sprinters considered favourites for the points classification and wins in bunch sprint finishes were Mark Cavendish (Omega Pharma–Quick-Step), Peter Sagan (Cannondale), André Greipel (Lotto–Belisol), Matthew Goss (Orica–GreenEDGE) and Argos–Shimano riders Marcel Kittel and John Degenkolb. Cavendish won the points classification at the 2013 Giro and had shown his form with thirteen wins in the season. In the previous year's Tour, Sagan won the points classification and had won the same at the Tour de Suisse in the month preceding the Tour. Greipel, whose team manager Marc Sergeant claimed he had the best sprint train, came into the Tour with nine wins in the season, including three at the Tour Down Under. Goss only had one victory in the season, but had a team of strong and experienced riders. Kittel, as with Greipel, would arrive with a team dedicated for the sprints and he had accumulated eleven wins in the season. His teammate Degenkolb won five stages at the 2012 Vuelta and it was thought he was most likely to be used for the hillier stages.

== Route and stages ==
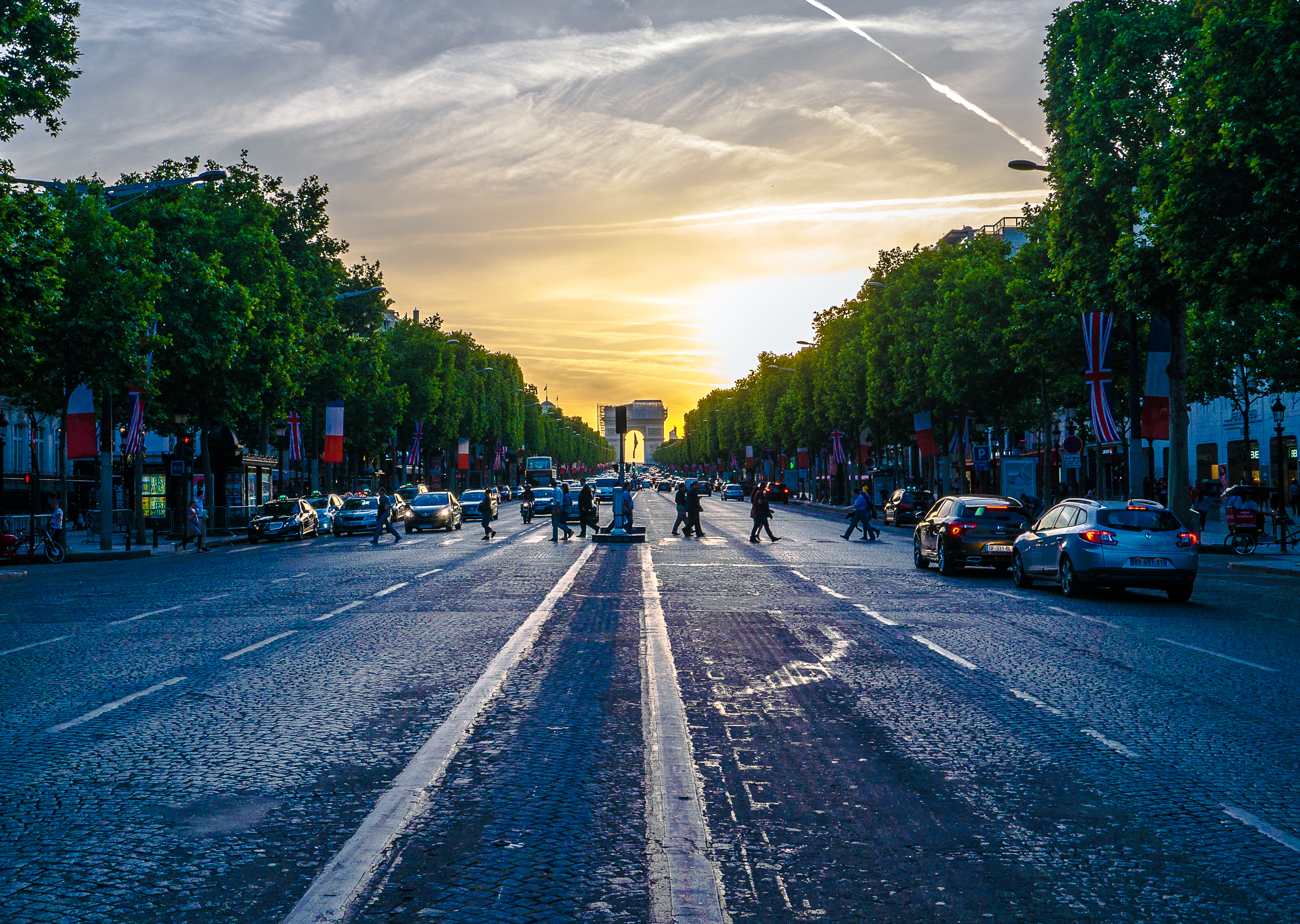
In celebration of the Tour's 100th edition the final stage, finishing on Champs-Élysées, took place in the evening for the first time.

On 24 November 2011, the ASO announced Corsica would host the 2013 edition's opening stages (known as the Grand Départ), the first time the Tour has visited the island. The route of the race was unveiled on 24 October 2012 at the Palais des Congrès in Paris. The Tour was the first to be completed entirely on French soil since 2003 and included ten new start or finish locations. The Grand Départ in Corsica consisted of three stages. The ASO chartered the Mega Smeralda cruiseferry in Porto-Vecchio to house members of the organisation, media and others who work on the Tour and to host press conferences. It featured a final set of stages which were described by journalist William Fotheringham as "brutal", including three Alpine stages in the last week along with a "viciously hard" time trial. As the 100th edition of the race, the race featured some of the famous climbs from the history of the race, Mont Ventoux and Alpe d'Huez, which was climbed twice in a stage for the first time.

The opening stage left Porto-Vecchio and ended in Bastia, with next two stages ending in Ajaccio and Calvi respectively. The race then moved to mainland France at Nice. Stages five to eight formed a four-stage journey that navigated westwards finishing at the Ax 3 Domaines ski resort in the Pyrenees. Stage nine took place between Saint-Girons to Bagnères-de-Bigorre, before a long transfer moved the race to the north-west of the country. Stage ten finished in the port city of Saint-Malo, with the next finishing at the Mont Saint-Michel island commune in Normandy. The following four stages, 11 to 15, crossed the centre of the country back to the south-east finishing atop Mont Ventoux. The next five stages took place in and around the Alps, before a second long transfer took the Tour to the finish with the Champs-Élysées stage in Paris.

There were 21 stages in the race, covering a total of 3,403.5 kilometres (2,115 mi), 93.4 km (58 mi) shorter than the 2012 Tour. The longest mass-start stage was the fourth at 228.5 km (142 mi), and stage 20 was the shortest at 125 km (78 mi). Eight stages were officially classified as flat, three medium mountain, seven high mountain, two individual time trial and one team time trial. There were four summit finishes: stage 8, to Ax 3 Domaines; stage 15, to Mont Ventoux; stage 18, to Alpe d'Huez; and stage 20, to Semnoz; The highest point of elevation in the race was the 2,001 m (6,565 ft)-high Port de Pailhères mountain pass on stage eight. It was among seven hors catégorie (English: beyond category) rated climbs in the race. The final stage ending on the Champs-Élysées was an evening finish for the first time. There were ten new stage start or finish locations. The rest days were after stage 9, in Saint-Nazaire, and 15, in Vaucluse.

Stage characteristics and winners
Stage	Date	Course	Distance	Type	Winner
1	29 June	Porto-Vecchio to Bastia	213 km (132 mi)	Flat stage	Marcel Kittel (GER)
2	30 June	Bastia to Ajaccio	156 km (97 mi)	Medium mountain stage	Jan Bakelants (BEL)
3	1 July	Ajaccio to Calvi	145.5 km (90 mi)	Medium mountain stage	Simon Gerrans (AUS)
4	2 July	Nice	25 km (16 mi)	Team time trial	Orica–GreenEDGE
5	3 July	Cagnes-sur-Mer to Marseille	228.5 km (142 mi)	Flat stage	Mark Cavendish (GBR)
6	4 July	Aix-en-Provence to Montpellier	176.5 km (110 mi)	Flat stage	André Greipel (GER)
7	5 July	Montpellier to Albi	205.5 km (128 mi)	Flat stage	Peter Sagan (SVK)
8	6 July	Castres to Ax 3 Domaines	195 km (121 mi)	High mountain stage	Chris Froome (GBR)
9	7 July	Saint-Girons – Bagnères-de-Bigorre	168.5 km (105 mi)	High mountain stage	Dan Martin (IRL)
	8 July	Saint-Nazaire		Rest day	
10	9 July	Saint-Gildas-des-Bois to Saint-Malo	197 km (122 mi)	Flat stage	Marcel Kittel (GER)
11	10 July	Avranches to Mont Saint-Michel	33 km (21 mi)	Individual time trial	Tony Martin (GER)
12	11 July	Fougères to Tours	218 km (135 mi)	Flat stage	Marcel Kittel (GER)
13	12 July	Tours to Saint-Amand-Montrond	173 km (107 mi)	Flat stage	Mark Cavendish (GBR)
14	13 July	Saint-Pourçain-sur-Sioule to Lyon	191 km (119 mi)	Medium mountain stage	Matteo Trentin (ITA)
15	14 July	Givors to Mont Ventoux	242.5 km (151 mi)	High mountain stage	Chris Froome (GBR)
	15 July	Vaucluse		Rest day	
16	16 July	Vaison-la-Romaine to Gap	168 km (104 mi)	High mountain stage	Rui Costa (POR)
17	17 July	Embrun to Chorges	32 km (20 mi)	Individual time trial	Chris Froome (GBR)
18	18 July	Gap to Alpe d'Huez	172.5 km (107 mi)	High mountain stage	Christophe Riblon (FRA)
19	19 July	Le Bourg-d'Oisans to Le Grand-Bornand	204.5 km (127 mi)	High mountain stage	Rui Costa (POR)
20	20 July	Annecy to Semnoz	125 km (78 mi)	High mountain stage	Nairo Quintana (COL)
21	21 July	Versailles to Paris (Champs-Élysées)	133.5 km (83 mi)	Flat stage	Marcel Kittel (GER)
	Total		3,403.5 km (2,115 mi)		

== Race overview ==
=== Opening week and Pyrenees ===
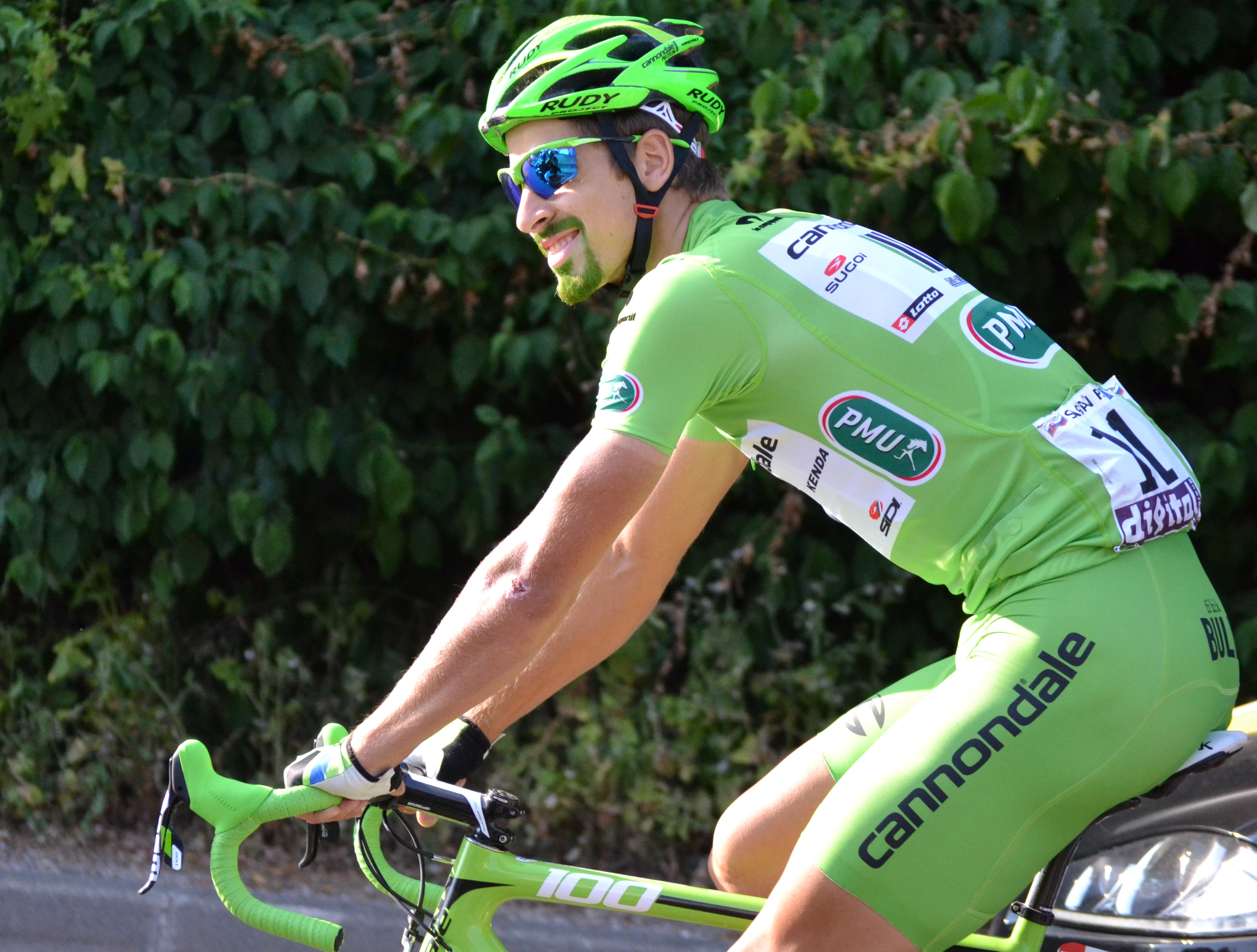
Peter Sagan (pictured in the final stage) held the green jersey as the leader of the points classification after the third stage until the end of the Tour.

In the first stage, the Orica–GreenEDGE team bus had become stuck under the finishing arch in Bastia, Corsica, and with the peloton (the main group) 10 km (6.2 mi) away, the race officials moved the finish to the 3 km (1.9 mi) to go marker. As the peloton closed in, the bus was freed, and the decision was reversed. Marcel Kittel took the victory from the bunch sprint, putting him in the race leader's yellow jersey; he also became the first leader of the points classification, with Juan José Lobato (Euskaltel–Euskadi) taking the polka dot jersey as the leader of the mountains classification. Two crashes occurred in the stage; the first with 37 km (23 mi) remaining and the second in the final kilometres, which included a contender for the stage, Mark Cavendish. The second stage RadioShack–Leopard's Jan Bakelants launched an attack from a breakaway group in the final kilometre to win in Ajaccio, one second ahead of the encroaching peloton. The yellow jersey switched to Bakelants, and Pierre Rolland of Team Europcar claimed the polka dot. Simon Gerrans (Orica–GreenEDGE) won the third stage, the final in Corsica, from a bunch sprint in Calvi. Peter Sagan took over the points classification. Orica–GreenEDGE won stage four's 25 km (15.5 mi) team time trial in and around Nice, putting Gerrans in the yellow jersey. Omega Pharma–Quick-Step came in second place, one second in arrears, with Team Sky a further two.

The fifth and sixth stages ended in bunch sprints, with Cavendish and André Greipel the victors respectively. After stage six, Daryl Impey became the first South African rider to wear the yellow jersey. His teammate Gerrans ensured it for him by holding back at the finish allowing Impey – who was second overall – the time necessary to replace him at the top of the general classification. Sagan claimed the seventh stage from a bunch sprint in Albi, with Ag2r–La Mondiale rider Blel Kadri talking the polka dot jersey. In stage eight, the Tour's first mountain stage, which ended at the Ax 3 Domaines, Froome attacked a select five-rider group, which included Alberto Contador and Alejandro Valverde, as they passed the lone leader Nairo Quintana with 5 km (3.1 mi) remaining. Froome took the stage win, fifty-one seconds ahead of his teammate Richie Porte, with Valverde third a further seventeen down. Contador and Quintana finished one minute forty-five seconds behind Froome. Froome's victory win put him in the lead of the general and mountains classifications, ahead of Porte. In the ninth stage, Froome managed to subdue attacks from his rivals, although his team's efforts left him isolated for the majority of the stage. After a descent from the mountain pass of La Hourquette d'Ancizan, a group of twenty-three riders came into the finish in Bagnères-de-Bigorre, where Dan Martin (Garmin–Sharp) beat Jakob Fuglsang (Astana) from sprint, twenty seconds ahead of the group. Porte lost eighteen minutes, dropping from second overall to thirty-third, with Valverde moving up to second. Rolland took back the polka dot jersey. The next day was the first rest day of the Tour.

=== North-west and journey south ===
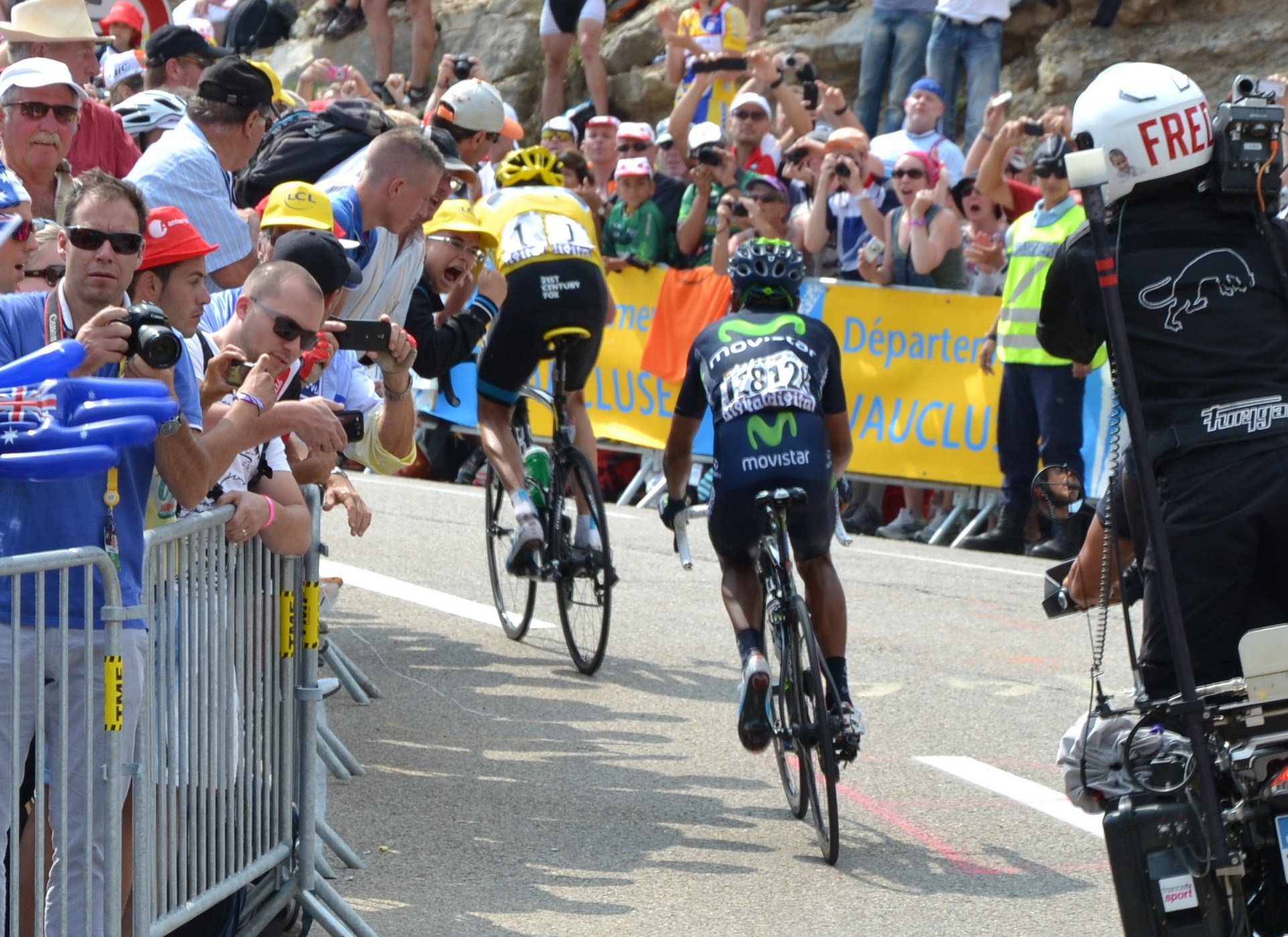
Chris Froome (Team Sky) leading Nairo Quintana (Movistar Team) to stage fifteen's finish atop Mont Ventoux, before Froome attacked to take his second of three stage wins.

Kittel took his second stage of the Tour win from the bunch sprint in the tenth stage, with his compatriot Greipel second. Stage eleven's individual time trial between Avranches and Mont Saint-Michel was taken by Omega Pharma–Quick-Step's Tony Martin. Froome came second with a deficit of twelve seconds, over two minutes ahead of the second placed overall Valverde, extending his lead to over three minutes. Two flat stages ending with bunch sprints then followed; the first, stage twelve, was won by Kittel, ahead of Cavendish, who came back to win the next. The stage saw Valverde suffer a punctured tyre and lose almost ten minutes, struggling to match the pace set by Cavendish's Omega Pharma–Quick-Step team at the head of the race. Stage fourteen was taken by Omega Pharma–Quick-Step's Matteo Trentin from a large breakaway that held off the peloton.

Stage fifteen, finishing on Mont Ventoux, saw Froome's Team Sky set a brutal pace on the opening kilometres of the Ventoux, so that all of the leading contenders, with the exception of Froome and Contador, dropped on the early part of the final climb. Froome then moved away from Contador and quickly caught Quintana, who had attacked earlier in the climb. The pair worked together to put time into their rivals, before Froome attacked with 1.2 km (0.7 mi) remaining and soloed to the finish for a second stage win. This gave Froome a lead of four minutes and fourteen seconds over Mollema in second place, with Contador, who had cracked completely in the final kilometre, a further eleven seconds back. Froome regained the lead in the mountains classification. The following day was the Tour's second rest day.

=== Alps and finale ===
The sixteenth stage saw a twenty-six rider breakaway reach the final climb, the Col de Manse, where Rui Costa (Movistar Team) attacked and then descended on his own to the finish in Gap. Froome won stage seventeen's time trial, finishing the 32 km (19.9 mi) course from Embrun to Chorges in 51 minutes and 33 seconds, with Contador coming in nine seconds behind, in second place. Contador moved up to second overall, four minutes and thirty-four seconds down, with teammate Roman Kreuziger third. In the Tour's queen stage, the eighteenth, early breakaway riders Christophe Riblon (Ag2r–La Mondiale) and Tejay van Garderen led on the second ascent of Alpe d'Huez. Van Garderen attacked on the early slopes, opening up a margin of forty-five seconds on Riblon in the second part of the climb, before Riblon passed with 2 km (1.2 mi) remaining and took the stage win by fifty-nine seconds. Quintana and Rodríguez came in fourth and fifth respectively, over two minutes in arrears. With 5 km (3.1 mi) to go, Porte and Froome, who came in under minute after the aforementioned pair, were penalised twenty seconds as Porte went back to the team car to retrieved an energy gel and water bottle for Froome outside the designated zone. Froome extended his lead over Contador by thirty-seven seconds.

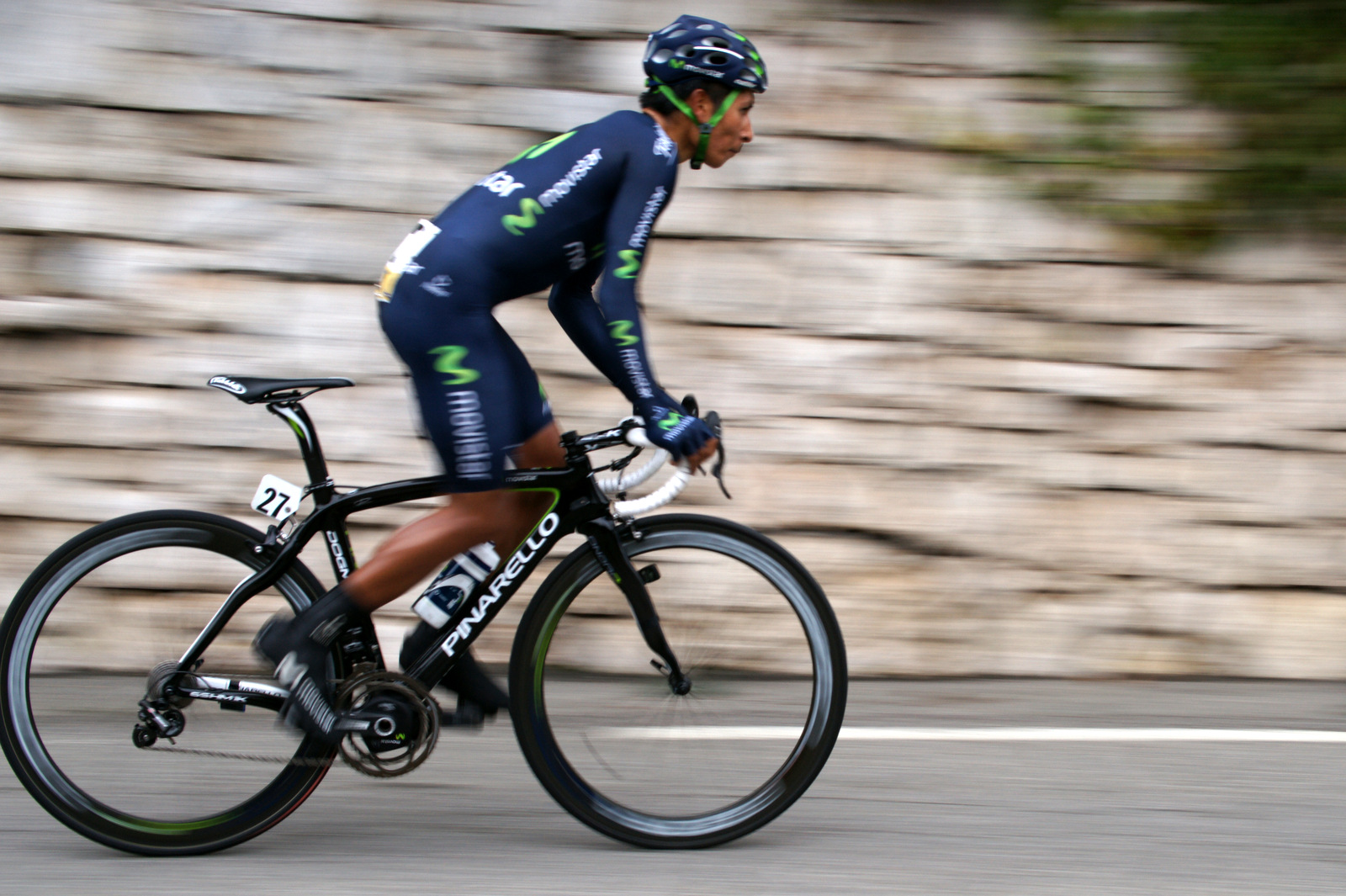
Nairo Quintana (pictured at the 2013 Paris–Nice) won the penultimate stage (stage twenty) at Mont Semnoz, securing the mountains classification.

Costa repeated his feat of three stages previous by taking victory in stage nineteen, by attacking on the final climb of Col de la Croix Fry and soloing to the finish in Le Grand-Bornand. There were no major changes at the head of general classification. Stage twenty, the penultimate stage, saw the leaders of the general classification still together at the head of the race with 8 km (5 mi) remaining of the final climb of Mont Semnoz. Quintana and Rodríguez then attacked, with Froome the only rider able to bridge, and again the pair pulling away, with Quintana managing to hold off Rodríguez by eighteen seconds to take the stage win, with Froome a further eleven down. Contador came in seventh, two minutes and twenty-eight in arrears, dropping to fourth overall, with Rodríguez moving up to third. With the double points gained with his win Quintana secured the mountains classification.

The final stage was won by Kittel on the Champs-Élysées, his fourth stage win of the race. Froome finished the race to claim his first Tour de France, becoming the second British rider to win the race. He beat second-placed Quintana by four minutes and twenty seconds, with Rodríguez third, a further forty-four seconds down. Sagan won his second consecutive points classification with a total of 409, 100 ahead of Cavendish in second. Froome placed second behind Quintana in the mountains classification, with Rolland third. The best young rider was Quintana, followed by Andrew Talansky (Garmin–Sharp) and Michał Kwiatkowski (Omega Pharma–Quick-Step) respectively. Saxo–Tinkoff finished as the winners of the team classification, eight minutes and twenty-eight seconds ahead of second-placed Ag2r–La Mondiale. Of the 198 starters, 169 reached the finish of the last stage in Paris.

== Classification leadership and minor prizes ==
There were four main individual classifications contested in the 2013 Tour de France, as well as a team competition. The most important was the general classification, which was calculated by adding each rider's finishing times on each stage. There were no time bonuses given at the end of stages for this edition of the Tour. If a crash had happened within the final 3 km (1.9 mi) of a stage, not including time trials and summit finishes, the riders involved would have received the same time as the group they were in when the crash occurred. The rider with the lowest cumulative time was the winner of the general classification and was considered the overall winner of the Tour. The rider leading the classification wore a yellow jersey.

Points classification points for the top 15 positions by type
Type	1	2	3	4	5	6	7	8	9	10	11	12	13	14	15
Flat stage	45	35	30	26	22	20	18	16	14	12	10	8	6	4	2
Medium mountain stage	30	25	22	19	17	15	13	11	9	7	6	5	4	3	2
High mountain stage	20	17	15	13	11	10	9	8	7	6	5	4	3	2	1
Individual time trial	20	17	15	13	11	10	9	8	7	6	5	4	3	2	1
Intermediate sprint	20	17	15	13	11	10	9	8	7	6	5	4	3	2	1

The second classification was the points classification. Riders received points for finishing among the highest placed in a stage finish, or in intermediate sprints during the stage. The points available for each stage finish were determined by the stage's type. No points were awarded for the team time trial on stage four. The leader was identified by a green jersey.

The third classification was the mountains classification. Points were awarded to the riders that reached the summit of the most difficult climbs first. The climbs were categorised as fourth-, third-, second-, first-category and hors catégorie], with the more difficult climbs rated lower. Double points were awarded on the summit finishes on stages 5, 15, 18 and 20. The leader wore a white jersey with red polka dots.

The final individual classification was the young rider classification. This was calculated the same way as the general classification, but the classification was restricted to riders who were born on or after 1 January 1988. The leader wore a white jersey.

The final classification was a team classification. This was calculated using the finishing times of the best three riders per team on each stage, excluding the team time trial; the leading team was the team with the lowest cumulative time. The number of stage victories and placings per team determined the outcome of a tie. The riders in the team that lead this classification were identified with yellow number bibs on the back of their jerseys and yellow helmets.

In addition, there was a combativity award given after each stage to the rider considered, by a jury, to have "made the greatest effort and who has demonstrated the best qualities of sportsmanship". No combativity awards were given for the time trials and the final stage. The winner wore a red number bib the following stage. At the conclusion of the Tour, Christophe Riblon won the overall super-combativity award, again, decided by a jury.

A total of €2,023,300 was awarded in cash prizes in the race. The overall winner of the general classification received €450,000, with the second and third placed riders got €200,000 and €100,000 respectively. All finishers of the race were awarded with money. The holders of the classifications benefited on each stage they led; the final winners of the points and mountains were given €25,000, while the best young rider and most combative rider got €20,000. Team prizes were available, with €10,000 for the winner of team time trial and €50,000 for the winners of the team classification. There was also a special award with a prize of €5,000, the Souvenir Henri Desgrange, given in honour of Tour founder Henri Desgrange to first rider to pass the summit of the highest climb in the Tour, the Port de Pailhères. This prize was won by Nairo Quintana on stage eight.

Classification leadership by stage
Stage	Winner	General classification	Points classification	Mountains classification	Young rider classification	Team classification	Combativity award
1	Marcel Kittel	Marcel Kittel	Marcel Kittel	Juan José Lobato	Marcel Kittel	Vacansoleil–DCM	Jérôme Cousin
2	Jan Bakelants	Jan Bakelants	Marcel Kittel	Pierre Rolland	Michał Kwiatkowski	RadioShack–Leopard	Blel Kadri
3	Simon Gerrans	Jan Bakelants	Peter Sagan	Pierre Rolland	Michał Kwiatkowski	RadioShack–Leopard	Simon Clarke
4	Orica–GreenEDGE	Simon Gerrans	Peter Sagan	Pierre Rolland	Michał Kwiatkowski	Orica–GreenEDGE	no award
5	Mark Cavendish	Simon Gerrans	Peter Sagan	Pierre Rolland	Michał Kwiatkowski	Orica–GreenEDGE	Thomas De Gendt
6	André Greipel	Daryl Impey	Peter Sagan	Pierre Rolland	Michał Kwiatkowski	Orica–GreenEDGE	André Greipel
7	Peter Sagan	Daryl Impey	Peter Sagan	Blel Kadri	Michał Kwiatkowski	Orica–GreenEDGE	Jan Bakelants
8	Chris Froome	Chris Froome	Peter Sagan	Chris Froome	Nairo Quintana	Movistar Team	Nairo Quintana
9	Dan Martin	Chris Froome	Peter Sagan	Pierre Rolland	Nairo Quintana	Movistar Team	Romain Bardet
10	Marcel Kittel	Chris Froome	Peter Sagan	Pierre Rolland	Nairo Quintana	Movistar Team	Jérôme Cousin
11	Tony Martin	Chris Froome	Peter Sagan	Pierre Rolland	Michał Kwiatkowski	Movistar Team	no award
12	Marcel Kittel	Chris Froome	Peter Sagan	Pierre Rolland	Michał Kwiatkowski	Movistar Team	Juan Antonio Flecha
13	Mark Cavendish	Chris Froome	Peter Sagan	Pierre Rolland	Michał Kwiatkowski	Saxo–Tinkoff	Mark Cavendish
14	Matteo Trentin	Chris Froome	Peter Sagan	Pierre Rolland	Michał Kwiatkowski	Saxo–Tinkoff	Julien Simon
15	Chris Froome	Chris Froome	Peter Sagan	Chris Froome	Nairo Quintana	Saxo–Tinkoff	Sylvain Chavanel
16	Rui Costa	Chris Froome	Peter Sagan	Chris Froome	Nairo Quintana	RadioShack–Leopard	Rui Costa
17	Chris Froome	Chris Froome	Peter Sagan	Chris Froome	Nairo Quintana	Saxo–Tinkoff	no award
18	Christophe Riblon	Chris Froome	Peter Sagan	Chris Froome	Nairo Quintana	Saxo–Tinkoff	Christophe Riblon
19	Rui Costa	Chris Froome	Peter Sagan	Chris Froome	Nairo Quintana	Saxo–Tinkoff	Pierre Rolland
20	Nairo Quintana	Chris Froome	Peter Sagan	Nairo Quintana	Nairo Quintana	Saxo–Tinkoff	Jens Voigt
21	Marcel Kittel	Chris Froome	Peter Sagan	Nairo Quintana	Nairo Quintana	Saxo–Tinkoff	no award
Final		Chris Froome	Peter Sagan	Nairo Quintana	Nairo Quintana	Saxo–Tinkoff	Christophe Riblon

- In stage two, Alexander Kristoff, who was second in the points classification, wore the green jersey, because Marcel Kittel wore the yellow jersey as leader of the general classification during that stage. Additionally, Danny van Poppel, who was second in the young rider classification, wore the white jersey, because Marcel Kittel wore the yellow jersey as leader of the general classification during that stage.
- In stage nine, Pierre Rolland, who was second in the mountains classification, wore the polka dot jersey, because Chris Froome wore the yellow jersey as leader of the general classification during that stage. Froome and Rolland both had collected 31 points up to this point, but Froome claimed the polka dot jersey, because he had crossed the line as first on first category mountains more often than Rolland.
- In stage thirteen, the combativity award was voted to Omega Pharma–Quick-Step by the jury to recognize the contributions of the entire team. Mark Cavendish was then selected to represent the team on the podium.
- In stages sixteen to eighteen, Mikel Nieve, who was third in the mountains classification, wore the polka dot jersey, because Chris Froome wore the yellow jersey as leader of the general classification during those stages, and Nairo Quintana wore the white jersey as leader of the young rider classification during the same stages.
- In stage nineteen, Christophe Riblon who was third in the mountains classification, wore the polka dot jersey, because Chris Froome wore the yellow jersey as leader of the general classification during those stages, and Nairo Quintana wore the white jersey as leader of the young rider classification during the same stages.
- In stage twenty, Pierre Rolland, who was second in the mountains classification, wore the polka dot jersey, because Chris Froome wore the yellow jersey as leader of the general classification during that stage.
- In stage twenty-one, Andrew Talansky, who was second in the young rider classification, wore the white jersey, because Nairo Quintana wore the polka dot jersey as leader of the mountains classification.

== Final standings ==
Legend
A yellow jersey.	Denotes the winner of the general classification	A green jersey.	Denotes the winner of the points classification
A white jersey with red polka dots.	Denotes the winner of the mountains classification	A white jersey.	Denotes the winner of the young rider classification
A white jersey with a yellow number bib.	Denotes the winner of the team classification	A white jersey with a red number bib.	Denotes the winner of the super-combativity award

=== General classification ===
Final general classification (1–10)
Rank	Rider	Team	Time
1	Chris Froome (UK)	Team Sky	83h 56' 40"
2	Nairo Quintana (COL)	Movistar Team	+ 4' 20"
3	Joaquim Rodríguez (ESP)	Team Katusha	+ 5' 04"
4	Alberto Contador (ESP)	Saxo–Tinkoff	+ 6' 27"
5	Roman Kreuziger (CZE)	Saxo–Tinkoff	+ 7' 27"
6	Bauke Mollema (NED)	Belkin Pro Cycling	+ 11' 42"
7	Jakob Fuglsang (DEN)	Astana	+ 12' 17"
8	Alejandro Valverde (ESP)	Movistar Team	+ 15' 26"
9	Daniel Navarro (ESP)	Cofidis	+ 15' 52"
10	Andrew Talansky (USA)	Garmin–Sharp	+ 17' 39"

Final general classification (11–169)
Rank	Rider	Team	Time
11	Michał Kwiatkowski (POL)	Omega Pharma–Quick-Step	+ 18' 59"
12	Mikel Nieve (ESP)	Euskaltel–Euskadi	+ 20' 01"
13	Laurens ten Dam (NED)	Belkin Pro Cycling	+ 21' 39"
14	Maxime Monfort (BEL)	RadioShack–Leopard	+ 23' 38"
15	Romain Bardet (FRA)	Ag2r–La Mondiale	+ 26' 42"
16	Michael Rogers (AUS)	Saxo–Tinkoff	+ 26' 51"
17	Daniel Moreno (ESP)	Team Katusha	+ 32' 34"
18	Jan Bakelants (BEL)	RadioShack–Leopard	+ 35' 51"
19	Richie Porte (AUS)	Team Sky	+ 39' 41"
20	Andy Schleck (LUX)	RadioShack–Leopard	+ 41' 46"
21	José Serpa (COL)	Lampre–Merida	+ 45' 08"
22	John Gadret (FRA)	Ag2r–La Mondiale	+ 46' 00"
23	Igor Antón (ESP)	Euskaltel–Euskadi	+ 48' 07"
24	Pierre Rolland (FRA)	Team Europcar	+ 52' 15"
25	Peter Velits (SVK)	Omega Pharma–Quick-Step	+ 54' 00"
26	Robert Gesink (NED)	Belkin Pro Cycling	+ 54' 25"
27	Rui Costa (POR)	Movistar Team	+ 54' 34"
28	Wout Poels (NED)	Vacansoleil–DCM	+ 56' 33"
29	Arnold Jeannesson (FRA)	FDJ.fr	+ 57' 06"
30	Andreas Klöden (GER)	RadioShack–Leopard	+ 1h 02' 43"
31	Sylvain Chavanel (FRA)	Omega Pharma–Quick-Step	+ 1h 03' 41"
32	Cyril Gautier (FRA)	Team Europcar	+ 1h 12' 42"
33	Dan Martin (IRL)	Garmin–Sharp	+ 1h 13' 08"
34	Hubert Dupont (FRA)	Ag2r–La Mondiale	+ 1h 14' 59"
35	Steve Morabito (SUI)	BMC Racing Team	+ 1h 20' 39"
36	Haimar Zubeldia (ESP)	RadioShack–Leopard	+ 1h 24' 22"
37	Christophe Riblon (FRA)	Ag2r–La Mondiale	+ 1h 27' 57"
38	Bart De Clercq (BEL)	Lotto–Belisol	+ 1h 28' 06"
39	Cadel Evans (AUS)	BMC Racing Team	+ 1h 30' 14"
40	Nicolas Roche (IRE)	Saxo–Tinkoff	+ 1h 34' 17"
41	Tom Dumoulin (NED)	Argos–Shimano	+ 1h 34' 30"
42	Mikel Astarloza (ESP)	Euskaltel–Euskadi	+ 1h 36' 27"
43	Jesús Hernández (ESP)	Saxo–Tinkoff	+ 1h 36' 40"
44	Alexandre Geniez (FRA)	FDJ.fr	+ 1h 38' 06"
45	Tejay van Garderen (USA)	BMC Racing Team	+ 1h 38' 57"
46	Alexis Vuillermoz (FRA)	Sojasun	+ 1h 40' 05"
47	Rubén Plaza (ESP)	Movistar Team	+ 1h 40' 35"
48	Eduard Vorganov (RUS)	Team Katusha	+ 1h 42' 41"
49	Davide Malacarne (ITA)	Team Europcar	+ 1h 44' 50"
50	Lars Petter Nordhaug (NOR)	Belkin Pro Cycling	+ 1h 49' 42"
51	Yuri Trofimov (RUS)	Team Katusha	+ 1h 49' 54"
52	Maxime Méderel (FRA)	Sojasun	+ 1h 53' 01"
53	Laurent Didier (LUX)	RadioShack–Leopard	+ 1h 58' 53"
54	Andrey Amador (CRC)	Movistar Team	+ 1h 58' 59"
55	Damiano Cunego (ITA)	Lampre–Merida	+ 1h 59' 38"
56	Amaël Moinard (FRA)	BMC Racing Team	+ 2h 00' 03"
57	Przemysław Niemiec (POL)	Lampre–Merida	+ 2h 00' 28"
58	Tony Gallopin (FRA)	RadioShack–Leopard	+ 2h 02' 59"
59	Pierrick Fédrigo (FRA)	FDJ.fr	+ 2h 04' 19"
60	Tom Danielson (USA)	Garmin–Sharp	+ 2h 05' 28"
61	Guillaume Levarlet (FRA)	Cofidis	+ 2h 07' 01"
62	Philippe Gilbert (BEL)	BMC Racing Team	+ 2h 07' 11"
63	Jérôme Coppel (FRA)	Cofidis	+ 2h 09' 13"
64	Bram Tankink (NED)	Belkin Pro Cycling	+ 2h 10' 12"
65	Thomas Voeckler (FRA)	Team Europcar	+ 2h 12' 48"
66	Arthur Vichot (FRA)	FDJ.fr	+ 2h 15' 06"
67	Jens Voigt (GER)	RadioShack–Leopard	+ 2h 15' 09"
68	Simon Clarke (AUS)	Orica–GreenEDGE	+ 2h 20' 14"
69	Ion Izagirre (ESP)	Euskaltel–Euskadi	+ 2h 21' 32"
70	Ryder Hesjedal (CAN)	Garmin–Sharp	+ 2h 21' 41"
71	Alessandro De Marchi (ITA)	Cannondale	+ 2h 23' 11"
72	Adam Hansen (AUS)	Lotto–Belisol	+ 2h 23' 15"
73	Rudy Molard (FRA)	Cofidis	+ 2h 25' 25"
74	Daryl Impey (RSA)	Orica–GreenEDGE	+ 2h 26' 37"
75	Simon Geschke (GER)	Argos–Shimano	+ 2h 27' 42"
76	Manuele Mori (ITA)	Lampre–Merida	+ 2h 28' 19"
77	Peter Kennaugh (GBR)	Team Sky	+ 2h 33' 46"
78	Juan José Oroz (ESP)	Euskaltel–Euskadi	+ 2h 33' 55"
79	José Joaquín Rojas (ESP)	Movistar Team	+ 2h 34' 05"
80	Simon Gerrans (AUS)	Orica–GreenEDGE	+ 2h 34' 36"
81	Julien El Fares (FRA)	Sojasun	+ 2h 36' 28"
82	Peter Sagan (SVK)	Cannondale	+ 2h 38' 51"
83	Sergey Lagutin (UZB)	Vacansoleil–DCM	+ 2h 38' 55"
84	Francesco Gavazzi (ITA)	Astana	+ 2h 39' 08"
85	Manuel Quinziato (ITA)	BMC Racing Team	+ 2h 39' 34"
86	Michael Albasini (SUI)	Orica–GreenEDGE	+ 2h 40' 22"
87	Julien Simon (FRA)	Sojasun	+ 2h 41' 24"
88	Luis Ángel Maté (ESP)	Cofidis	+ 2h 43' 28"
89	Anthony Delaplace (FRA)	Sojasun	+ 2h 44' 13"
90	Kanstantsin Sivtsov (BLR)	Team Sky	+ 2h 44' 43"
91	Brent Bookwalter (USA)	BMC Racing Team	+ 2h 45' 05"
92	Matteo Tosatto (ITA)	Saxo–Tinkoff	+ 2h 47' 39"
93	Juan Antonio Flecha (ESP)	Vacansoleil–DCM	+ 2h 48' 03"
94	Moreno Moser (ITA)	Cannondale	+ 2h 53' 27"
95	Enrico Gasparotto (ITA)	Astana	+ 2h 53' 36"
96	Thomas De Gendt (BEL)	Vacansoleil–DCM	+ 2h 53' 41"
97	Jonathan Castroviejo (ESP)	Movistar Team	+ 2h 53' 41"
98	Marcus Burghardt (GER)	BMC Racing Team	+ 2h 54' 01"
99	Yukiya Arashiro (JPN)	Team Europcar	+ 2h 54' 53"
100	Kristijan Koren (SLO)	Cannondale	+ 2h 57' 03"
101	Johnny Hoogerland (NED)	Vacansoleil–DCM	+ 2h 57' 59"
102	Rein Taaramäe (EST)	Cofidis	+ 2h 59' 09"
103	Markel Irizar (ESP)	RadioShack–Leopard	+ 2h 59' 39"
104	Brice Feillu (FRA)	Sojasun	+ 2h 59' 45"
105	Lars Boom (NED)	Belkin Pro Cycling	+ 3h 02' 52"
106	Tony Martin (GER)	Omega Pharma–Quick-Step	+ 3h 05' 25"
107	Daniele Bennati (ITA)	Saxo–Tinkoff	+ 3h 05' 55"
108	Lars Bak (DEN)	Lotto–Belisol	+ 3h 07' 12"
109	Alberto Losada (ESP)	Team Katusha	+ 3h 07' 26"
110	Pavel Brutt (RUS)	Team Katusha	+ 3h 09' 47"
111	Alan Marangoni (ITA)	Cannondale	+ 3h 10' 01"
112	Cyril Lemoine (FRA)	Sojasun	+ 3h 11' 38"
113	David Millar (GBR)	Garmin–Sharp	+ 3h 14' 25"
114	Maciej Bodnar (POL)	Cannondale	+ 3h 15' 15"
115	Egoitz García (ESP)	Cofidis	+ 3h 16' 28"
116	Jean-Marc Marino (FRA)	Sojasun	+ 3h 16' 30"
117	Fabio Sabatini (ITA)	Cannondale	+ 3h 18' 40"
118	Imanol Erviti (ESP)	Movistar Team	+ 3h 19' 12"
119	Gatis Smukulis (LAT)	Team Katusha	+ 3h 21' 06"
120	Ramūnas Navardauskas (LTU)	Garmin–Sharp	+ 3h 21' 29"
121	John Degenkolb (GER)	Argos–Shimano	+ 3h 23' 23"
122	Romain Sicard (FRA)	Euskaltel–Euskadi	+ 3h 23' 54"
123	David Veilleux (CAN)	Team Europcar	+ 3h 24' 16"
124	Sébastien Minard (FRA)	Ag2r–La Mondiale	+ 3h 24' 28"
125	Blel Kadri (FRA)	Ag2r–La Mondiale	+ 3h 27' 17"
126	Jérémy Roy (FRA)	FDJ.fr	+ 3h 28' 39"
127	David López (ESP)	Team Sky	+ 3h 28' 47"
128	Elia Favilli (ITA)	Lampre–Merida	+ 3h 31' 19"
129	André Greipel (GER)	Lotto–Belisol	+ 3h 32' 07"
130	Cameron Meyer (AUS)	Orica–GreenEDGE	+ 3h 32' 14"
131	Sep Vanmarcke (BEL)	Belkin Pro Cycling	+ 3h 34' 33"
132	Maarten Wynants (BEL)	Belkin Pro Cycling	+ 3h 37' 06"
133	Murilo Fischer (BRA)	FDJ.fr	+ 3h 37' 48"
134	Kévin Reza (FRA)	Team Europcar	+ 3h 38' 31"
135	Ian Stannard (GBR)	Team Sky	+ 3h 38' 49"
136	Sérgio Paulinho (POR)	Saxo–Tinkoff	+ 3h 38' 58"
137	Davide Cimolai (ITA)	Lampre–Merida	+ 3h 40' 31"
138	Koen de Kort (NED)	Argos–Shimano	+ 3h 40' 55"
139	Rubén Pérez (ESP)	Euskaltel–Euskadi	+ 3h 43' 15"
140	Geraint Thomas (GBR)	Team Sky	+ 3h 43' 34"
141	Aleksandr Kuschynski (BLR)	Team Katusha	+ 3h 45' 02"
142	Matteo Trentin (ITA)	Omega Pharma–Quick-Step	+ 3h 45' 30"
143	Samuel Dumoulin (FRA)	Ag2r–La Mondiale	+ 3h 47' 11"
144	Boy van Poppel (NED)	Vacansoleil–DCM	+ 3h 48' 15"
145	Roy Curvers (NED)	Argos–Shimano	+ 3h 48' 30"
146	Johannes Fröhlinger (GER)	Argos–Shimano	+ 3h 49' 02"
147	Alexander Kristoff (NOR)	Team Katusha	+ 3h 49' 50"
148	Mark Cavendish (GBR)	Omega Pharma–Quick-Step	+ 3h 52' 04"
149	Niki Terpstra (NED)	Omega Pharma–Quick-Step	+ 3h 52' 05"
150	Tom Leezer (NED)	Belkin Pro Cycling	+ 3h 53' 55"
151	Jonathan Hivert (FRA)	Sojasun	+ 3h 57' 09"
152	Matthew Goss (AUS)	Orica–GreenEDGE	+ 3h 57' 24"
153	Gert Steegmans (BEL)	Omega Pharma–Quick-Step	+ 3h 59' 14"
154	Brett Lancaster (AUS)	Orica–GreenEDGE	+ 4h 00' 19"
155	Brian Vandborg (DEN)	Cannondale	+ 4h 00' 21"
156	Jérôme Cousin (FRA)	Team Europcar	+ 4h 01' 10"
157	Roberto Ferrari (ITA)	Lampre–Merida	+ 4h 02' 09"
158	Yohann Gène (FRA)	Team Europcar	+ 4h 03' 06"
159	Jérôme Pineau (FRA)	Omega Pharma–Quick-Step	+ 4h 03' 11"
160	Jürgen Roelandts (BEL)	Lotto–Belisol	+ 4h 03' 18"
161	Stuart O'Grady (AUS)	Orica–GreenEDGE	+ 4h 03' 27"
162	Greg Henderson (NZL)	Lotto–Belisol	+ 4h 04' 26"
163	Frederik Willems (BEL)	Lotto–Belisol	+ 4h 05' 18"
164	Albert Timmer (NED)	Argos–Shimano	+ 4h 07' 19"
165	Juan José Lobato (ESP)	Euskaltel–Euskadi	+ 4h 07' 59"
166	Marcel Kittel (GER)	Argos–Shimano	+ 4h 10' 08"
167	Dimitry Muravyev (KAZ)	Astana	+ 4h 21' 46"
168	Assan Bazayev (KAZ)	Astana	+ 4h 24' 52"
169	Svein Tuft (CAN)	Orica–GreenEDGE	+ 4h 27' 55"

=== Points classification ===
Final points classification (1–10)
Rank	Rider	Team	Points
1	Peter Sagan (SVK)	Cannondale	409
2	Mark Cavendish (GBR)	Omega Pharma–Quick-Step	312
3	André Greipel (GER)	Lotto–Belisol	267
4	Marcel Kittel (GER)	Argos–Shimano	222
5	Alexander Kristoff (NOR)	Team Katusha	177
6	Juan Antonio Flecha (ESP)	Vacansoleil–DCM	163
7	José Joaquín Rojas (ESP)	Movistar Team	156
8	Michał Kwiatkowski (POL)	Omega Pharma–Quick-Step	110
9	Chris Froome (GBR)	Team Sky	107
10	Christophe Riblon (FRA)	Ag2r–La Mondiale	104

=== Mountains classification ===
Final mountains classification (1–10)
Rank	Rider	Team	Points
1	Nairo Quintana (COL)	Movistar Team	147
2	Chris Froome (GBR)	Team Sky	136
3	Pierre Rolland (FRA)	Team Europcar	119
4	Joaquim Rodríguez (ESP)	Team Katusha	99
5	Christophe Riblon (FRA)	Ag2r–La Mondiale	98
6	Mikel Nieve (ESP)	Euskaltel–Euskadi	98
7	Moreno Moser (ITA)	Cannondale	72
8	Richie Porte (AUS)	Team Sky	72
9	Ryder Hesjedal (CAN)	Garmin–Sharp	64
10	Tejay van Garderen (USA)	BMC Racing Team	63

=== Young rider classification ===
Final young rider classification (1–10)
Rank	Rider	Team	Time
1	Nairo Quintana (COL)	Movistar Team	84h 01' 00"
2	Andrew Talansky (USA)	Garmin–Sharp	+ 13' 19″
3	Michał Kwiatkowski (POL)	Omega Pharma–Quick-Step	+ 14' 39"
4	Romain Bardet (FRA)	Ag2r–La Mondiale	+ 22′ 22″
5	Tom Dumoulin (NED)	Argos–Shimano	+ 1h 30′ 10″
6	Alexandre Geniez (FRA)	FDJ.fr	+ 1h 33' 46″
7	Tejay van Garderen (USA)	BMC Racing Team	+ 1h 34' 37″
8	Alexis Vuillermoz (FRA)	Sojasun	+ 1h 35′ 45″
9	Tony Gallopin (FRA)	RadioShack–Leopard	+ 1h 58' 39″
10	Arthur Vichot (FRA)	FDJ.fr	+ 2h 10' 46″

=== Team classification ===
Final team classification (1–10)
Rank	Team	Time
1	(Denmark) Saxo–Tinkoff	251h 11′ 07″
2	(France) Ag2r–La Mondiale	+ 8' 28″
3	(Luxembourg) RadioShack–Leopard	+ 9' 02″
4	(Spain) Movistar Team	+ 22' 49″
5	(Netherlands) Belkin Pro Cycling	+ 38' 30″
6	Team Katusha	+ 1h 03' 48″
7	(Spain) Euskaltel–Euskadi	+ 1h 30' 34″
8	(Belgium) Omega Pharma–Quick-Step	+ 1h 50' 25″
9	(United Kingdom) Team Sky	+ 1h 56' 42″
10	(France) Cofidis	+ 2h 07' 11″

== UCI World Tour rankings ==
Riders from the ProTeams competing individually, as well as for their teams and nations, for points that contributed towards the World Tour rankings. Points were awarded to the top twenty finishers in the general classification and to the top five finishers in each stage. The 587 points accrued by Chris Froome put him in to the lead of the individual ranking, with Peter Sagan dropping to second. Team Sky retained their lead of the team ranking, ahead of second-placed Movistar Team. Spain remained as leaders of the nation ranking, with Great Britain second.

UCI World Tour individual ranking on 21 July 2013 (1–10)
Rank	Prev.	Name	Team	Points
1	4	Chris Froome (GBR)	Team Sky	587
2	2	Peter Sagan (SVK)	Cannondale	409
3	8	Joaquim Rodríguez (ESP)	Team Katusha	390
4	13	Nairo Quintana (COL)	Movistar Team	366
5	1	Fabian Cancellara (SUI)	RadioShack–Leopard	351
6	6	Dan Martin (IRL)	Garmin–Sharp	327
7	3	Vincenzo Nibali (ITA)	Astana	322
8	5	Richie Porte (AUS)	Team Sky	287
9	12	Alejandro Valverde (ESP)	Movistar Team	274
10	16	Roman Kreuziger (CZE)	Saxo–Tinkoff	258

== See also ==
- 2013 in men's road cycling
- 2013 in sports

== Bibliography ==
- Liggett, Phil; Raia, James; Lewis, Sammarye (2005). Tour de France for Dummies. Indianapolis, IN: John Wiley & Sons. ISBN 978-0-7645-8449-7.
- Race regulations (PDF). Paris: Amaury Sport Organisation. 2013. Archived from the original (PDF) on 10 May 2015.
- UCI cycling regulations. Part 2, road races. Aigle, Switzerland: Union Cycliste Internationale. 1 January 2013. Archived from the original on 16 March 2013.
