= 2013 Tour de France, Stage 12 to Stage 21 =

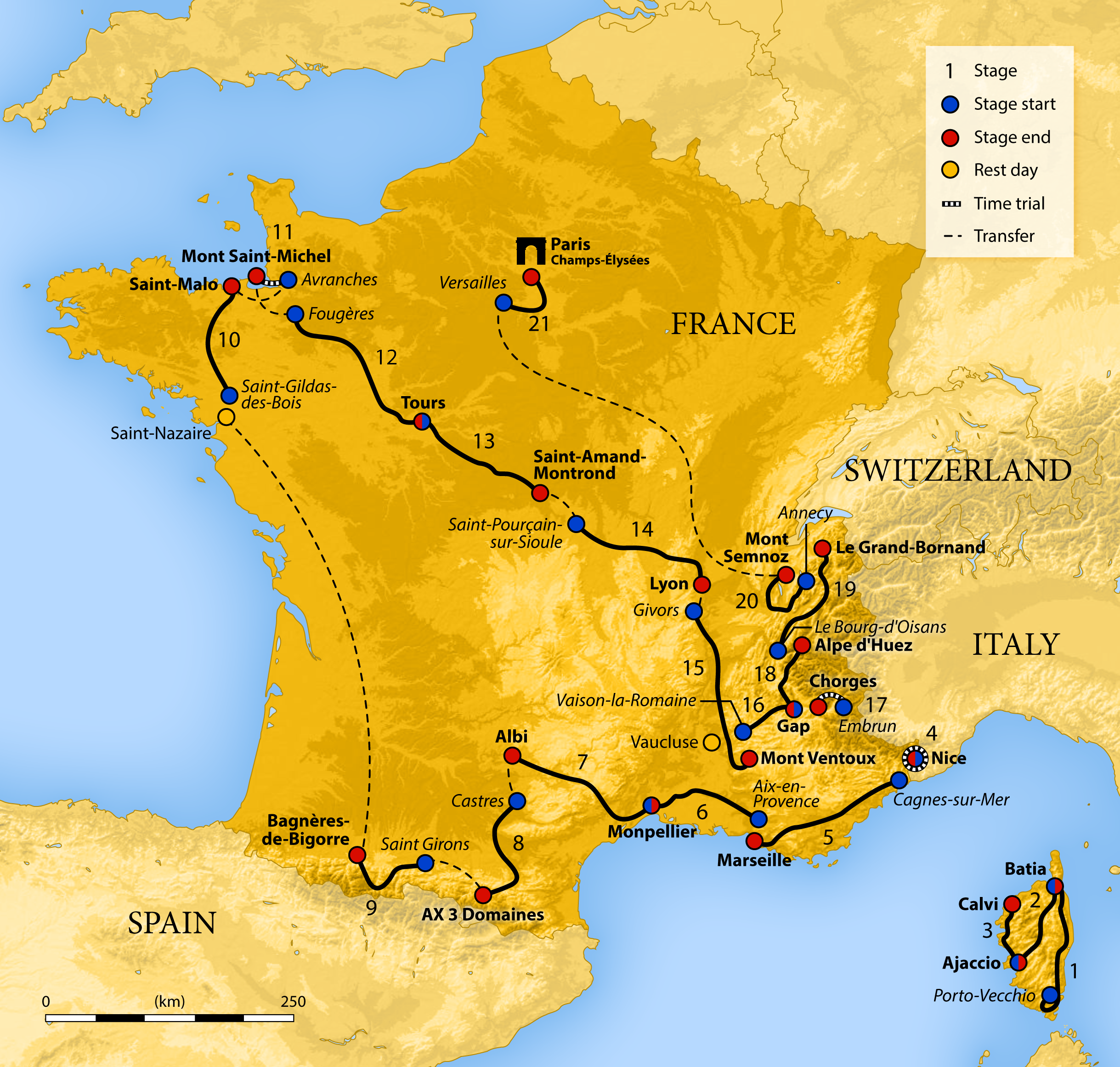
Route of the 2013 Tour de France

The 2013 Tour de France was the 100th Tour de France. It ran from 29 June 2013 to 21 July 2013, starting in the city of Porto-Vecchio in Corsica.

== Stage 12 ==
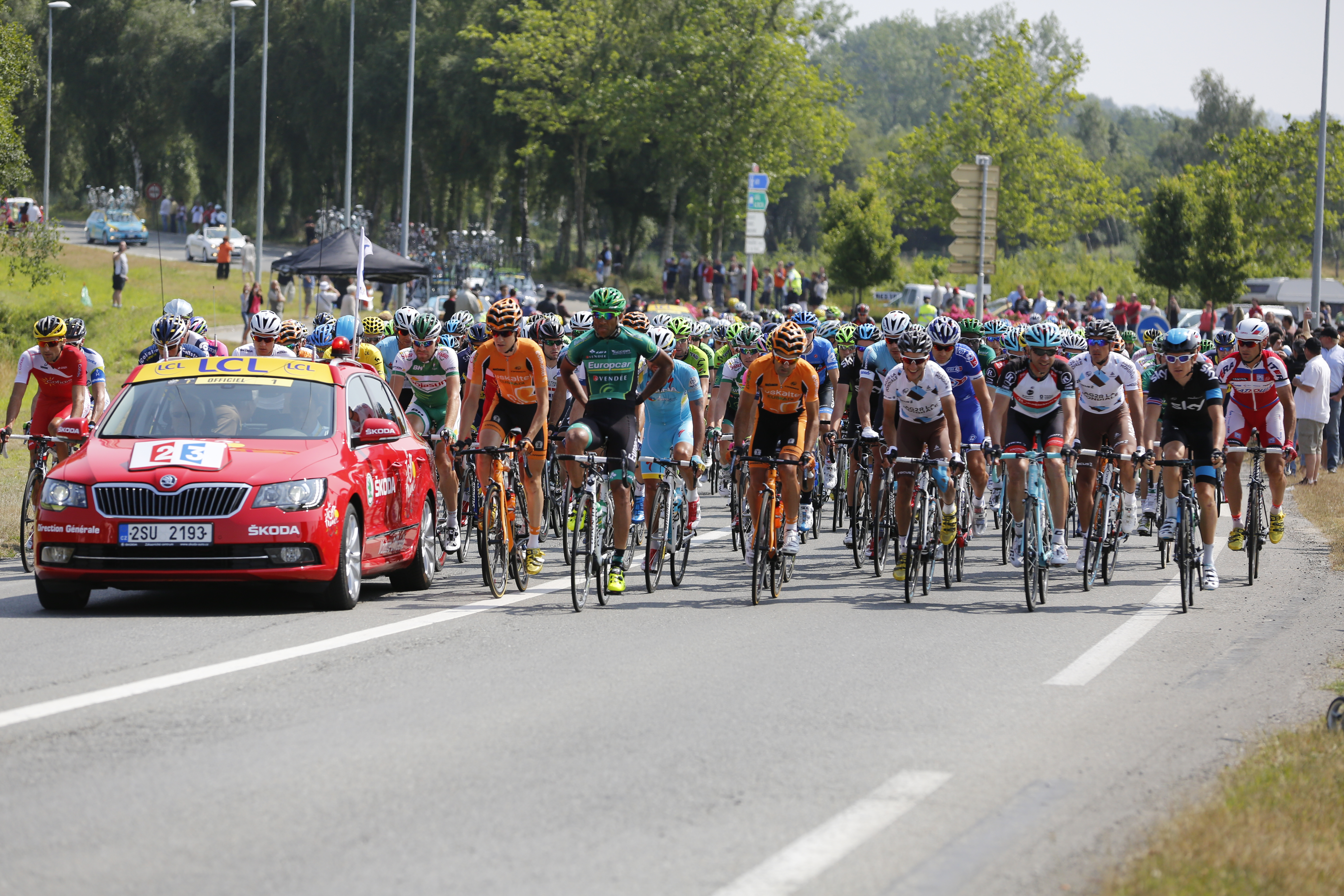
Neutralized zone, Fougères

11 July 2013 — Fougères to Tours, 218 km (135.5 mi)

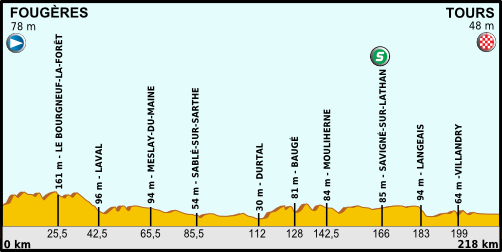
Stage profile

Stage 12 result

Rank	Rider	Team	Time
1	Marcel Kittel (GER)	Argos–Shimano	4h 49' 49"
2	Mark Cavendish (GBR)	Omega Pharma–Quick-Step	s.t.
3	Peter Sagan (SVK)	Cannondale	s.t.
4	Alexander Kristoff (NOR)	Team Katusha	s.t.
5	Roberto Ferrari (ITA)	Lampre–Merida	s.t.
6	Daryl Impey (RSA)	Orica–GreenEDGE	s.t.
7	José Joaquín Rojas (ESP)	Movistar Team	s.t.
8	Yohann Gène (FRA)	Team Europcar	s.t.
9	Juan José Lobato (ESP)	Euskaltel–Euskadi	s.t.
10	Samuel Dumoulin (FRA)	Ag2r–La Mondiale	s.t.

General classification after stage 12

Rank	Rider	Team	Time
1	Chris Froome (GBR)	Team Sky	47h 19' 13"
2	Alejandro Valverde (ESP)	Movistar Team	+ 3' 25"
3	Bauke Mollema (NED)	Belkin Pro Cycling	+ 3' 37"
4	Alberto Contador (ESP)	Saxo–Tinkoff	+ 3' 54"
5	Roman Kreuziger (CZE)	Saxo–Tinkoff	+ 3' 57"
6	Laurens ten Dam (NED)	Belkin Pro Cycling	+ 4' 10"
7	Michał Kwiatkowski (POL)	Omega Pharma–Quick-Step	+ 4' 44"
8	Nairo Quintana (COL)	Movistar Team	+ 5' 18"
9	Rui Costa (POR)	Movistar Team	+ 5' 37"
10	Jean-Christophe Péraud (FRA)	Ag2r–La Mondiale	+ 5' 39"

== Stage 13 ==
12 July 2013 — Tours to Saint-Amand-Montrond, 173 km (107.5 mi)

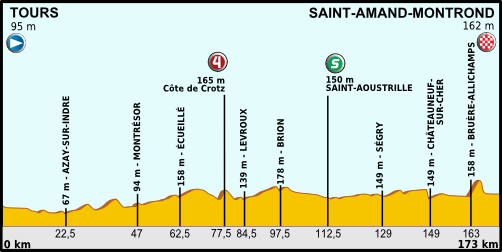
Stage profile

The 13th stage saw a big change in the general classification due to crosswinds leading to the formation of echelons. A 15-man group led by Alberto Contador's Team Saxo Bank, with the help of eventual stage winner Mark Cavendish's Omega Pharma–Quick-Step and Bauke Mollema's Belkin Pro Cycling used the crosswinds to make a gap with other General Classification riders 31 kilometres from the finish to form the echelons. Then again This helped Contador gain 1'09" on – among others – Chris Froome, Nairo Quintana and Joaquim Rodríguez. The biggest victim however was the number 2 in the General Classification at that point: Alejandro Valverde. He lost 9'54" after having a puncture at a critical point in the race. The stage saw escapees Bauke Mollema move to second, Alberto Contador to third, Roman Kreuziger to fourth, Laurens ten Dam to fifth and Jakob Fuglsang to sixth in the General Classification. Chris Froome retained the yellow jersey, while Alejandro Valverde dropped to 16th.

Stage 13 result

Rank	Rider	Team	Time
1	Mark Cavendish (GBR)	Omega Pharma–Quick-Step	3h 40' 08"
2	Peter Sagan (SVK)	Cannondale	s.t.
3	Bauke Mollema (NED)	Belkin Pro Cycling	s.t.
4	Jakob Fuglsang (DEN)	Astana	s.t.
5	Niki Terpstra (NED)	Omega Pharma–Quick-Step	s.t.
6	Roman Kreuziger (CZE)	Saxo–Tinkoff	s.t.
7	Alberto Contador (ESP)	Saxo–Tinkoff	s.t.
8	Laurens ten Dam (NED)	Belkin Pro Cycling	s.t.
9	Sylvain Chavanel (FRA)	Omega Pharma–Quick-Step	+ 6"
10	Michael Rogers (AUS)	Saxo–Tinkoff	+ 9"

General classification after stage 13

Rank	Rider	Team	Time
1	Chris Froome (GBR)	Team Sky	51h 00' 30"
2	Bauke Mollema (NED)	Belkin Pro Cycling	+ 2' 28"
3	Alberto Contador (ESP)	Saxo–Tinkoff	+ 2' 45"
4	Roman Kreuziger (CZE)	Saxo–Tinkoff	+ 2' 48"
5	Laurens ten Dam (NED)	Belkin Pro Cycling	+ 3' 01"
6	Jakob Fuglsang (DEN)	Astana	+ 4' 39"
7	Michał Kwiatkowski (POL)	Omega Pharma–Quick-Step	+ 4' 44"
8	Nairo Quintana (COL)	Movistar Team	+ 5' 18"
9	Jean-Christophe Péraud (FRA)	Ag2r–La Mondiale	+ 5' 39"
10	Joaquim Rodríguez (ESP)	Team Katusha	+ 5' 48"

== Stage 14 ==
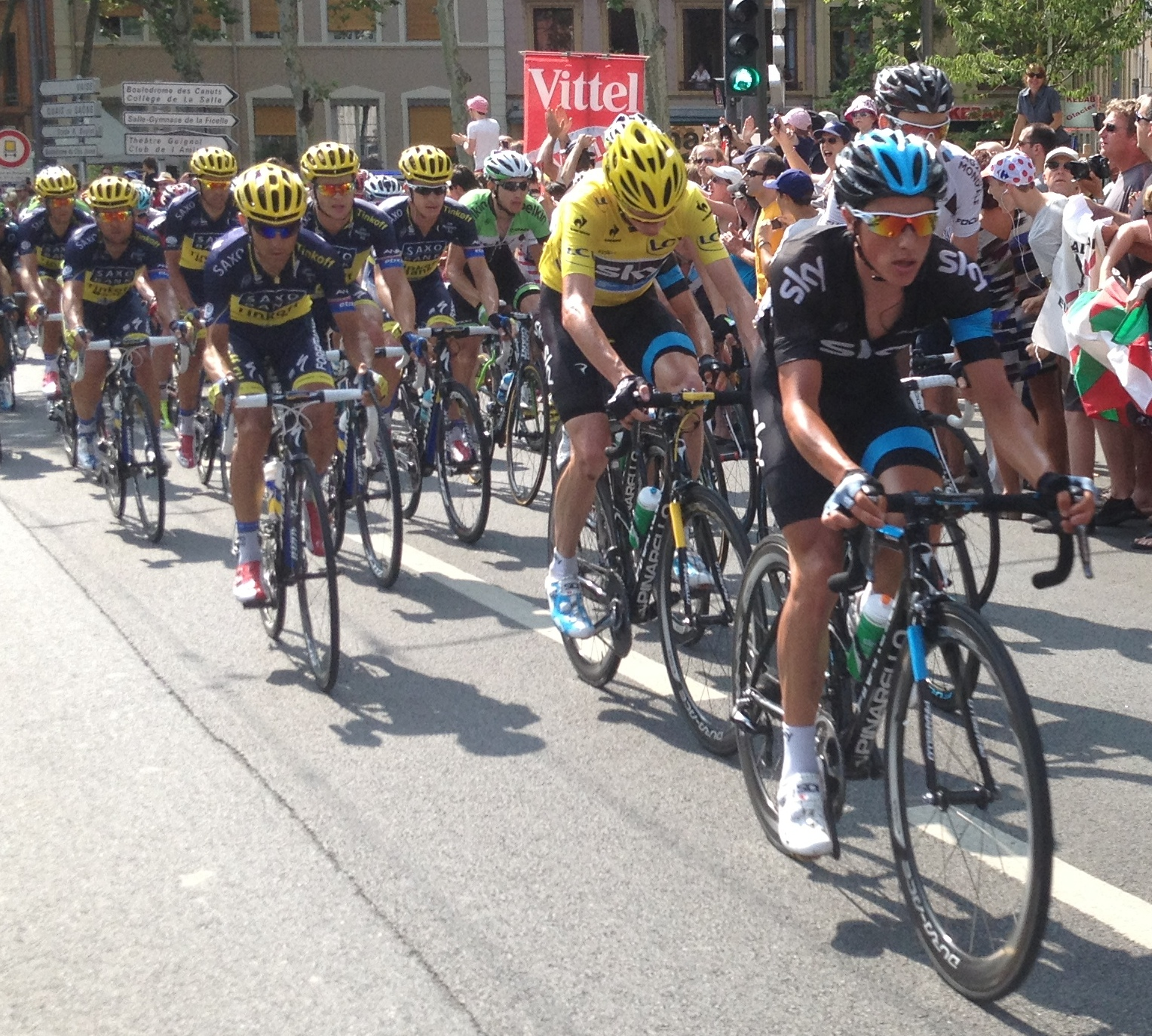
Côte de La Croix-Rousse

13 July 2013 — Saint-Pourçain-sur-Sioule to Lyon, 191 km (118.7 mi)

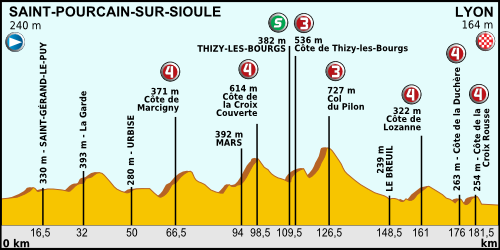
Stage profile

Stage 14 result

Rank	Rider	Team	Time
1	Matteo Trentin (ITA)	Omega Pharma–Quick-Step	4h 15' 11"
2	Michael Albasini (SUI)	Orica–GreenEDGE	s.t.
3	Andrew Talansky (USA)	Garmin–Sharp	s.t.
4	José Joaquín Rojas (ESP)	Movistar Team	s.t.
5	Egoitz García (ESP)	Cofidis	s.t.
6	Lars Bak (DEN)	Lotto–Belisol	s.t.
7	Simon Geschke (GER)	Argos–Shimano	s.t.
8	Arthur Vichot (FRA)	FDJ.fr	s.t.
9	Pavel Brutt (RUS)	Team Katusha	s.t.
10	Cyril Gautier (FRA)	Team Europcar	s.t.

General classification after stage 14

Rank	Rider	Team	Time
1	Chris Froome (GBR)	Team Sky	55h 22' 58"
2	Bauke Mollema (NED)	Belkin Pro Cycling	+ 2' 28"
3	Alberto Contador (ESP)	Saxo–Tinkoff	+ 2' 45"
4	Roman Kreuziger (CZE)	Saxo–Tinkoff	+ 2' 48"
5	Laurens ten Dam (NED)	Belkin Pro Cycling	+ 3' 01"
6	Jakob Fuglsang (DEN)	Astana	+ 4' 39"
7	Michał Kwiatkowski (POL)	Omega Pharma–Quick-Step	+ 4' 44"
8	Nairo Quintana (COL)	Movistar Team	+ 5' 18"
9	Jean-Christophe Péraud (FRA)	Ag2r–La Mondiale	+ 5' 39"
10	Joaquim Rodríguez (ESP)	Team Katusha	+ 5' 48"

== Stage 15 ==
14 July 2013 — Givors to Mont Ventoux, 242.5 km (150.7 mi)

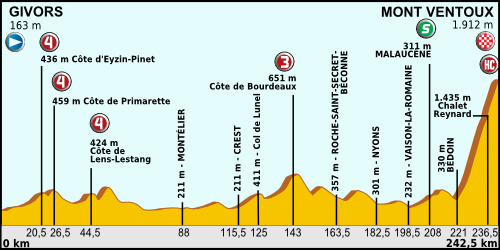
Stage profile

Stage 15 result

Rank	Rider	Team	Time
1	Chris Froome (GBR)	Team Sky	5h 48' 45"
2	Nairo Quintana (COL)	Movistar Team	+ 29"
3	Mikel Nieve (ESP)	Euskaltel–Euskadi	+ 1' 23"
4	Joaquim Rodríguez (ESP)	Team Katusha	+ 1' 23"
5	Roman Kreuziger (CZE)	Saxo–Tinkoff	+ 1' 40"
6	Alberto Contador (ESP)	Saxo–Tinkoff	+ 1' 40"
7	Jakob Fuglsang (DEN)	Astana	+ 1' 43"
8	Bauke Mollema (NED)	Belkin Pro Cycling	+ 1' 46"
9	Laurens ten Dam (NED)	Belkin Pro Cycling	+ 1' 53"
10	Jean-Christophe Péraud (FRA)	Ag2r–La Mondiale	+ 2' 08"

General classification after stage 15

Rank	Rider	Team	Time
1	Chris Froome (GBR)	Team Sky	61h 11' 43"
2	Bauke Mollema (NED)	Belkin Pro Cycling	+ 4' 14"
3	Alberto Contador (ESP)	Saxo–Tinkoff	+ 4' 25"
4	Roman Kreuziger (CZE)	Saxo–Tinkoff	+ 4' 28"
5	Laurens ten Dam (NED)	Belkin Pro Cycling	+ 4' 54"
6	Nairo Quintana (COL)	Movistar Team	+ 5' 47"
7	Jakob Fuglsang (DEN)	Astana	+ 6' 22"
8	Joaquim Rodríguez (ESP)	Team Katusha	+ 7' 11"
9	Jean-Christophe Péraud (FRA)	Ag2r–La Mondiale	+ 7' 47"
10	Michał Kwiatkowski (POL)	Omega Pharma–Quick-Step	+ 7' 58"

== Stage 16 ==
16 July 2013 — Vaison-la-Romaine to Gap, 168 km (104.4 mi)

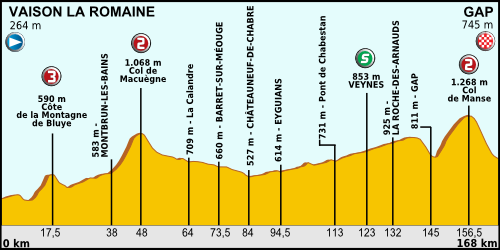
Stage profile

Stage 16 result

Rank	Rider	Team	Time
1	Rui Costa (POR)	Movistar Team	3h 52' 45"
2	Christophe Riblon (FRA)	Ag2r–La Mondiale	+ 42"
3	Arnold Jeannesson (FRA)	FDJ.fr	+ 42"
4	Jérôme Coppel (FRA)	Cofidis	+ 42"
5	Andreas Klöden (GER)	RadioShack–Leopard	+ 42"
6	Tom Dumoulin (NED)	Argos–Shimano	+ 1' 00"
7	Mikel Astarloza (ESP)	Euskaltel–Euskadi	+ 1' 01"
8	Philippe Gilbert (BEL)	BMC Racing Team	+ 1' 04"
9	Cameron Meyer (AUS)	Orica–GreenEDGE	+ 1' 04"
10	Ramūnas Navardauskas (LTU)	Garmin–Sharp	+ 1' 04"

General classification after stage 16

Rank	Rider	Team	Time
1	Chris Froome (GBR)	Team Sky	65h 15' 36"
2	Bauke Mollema (NED)	Belkin Pro Cycling	+ 4' 14"
3	Alberto Contador (ESP)	Saxo–Tinkoff	+ 4' 25"
4	Roman Kreuziger (CZE)	Saxo–Tinkoff	+ 4' 28"
5	Nairo Quintana (COL)	Movistar Team	+ 5' 47"
6	Laurens ten Dam (NED)	Belkin Pro Cycling	+ 5' 54"
7	Joaquim Rodríguez (ESP)	Team Katusha	+ 7' 11"
8	Jakob Fuglsang (DEN)	Astana	+ 7' 22"
9	Jean-Christophe Péraud (FRA)	Ag2r–La Mondiale	+ 8' 47"
10	Dan Martin (IRL)	Garmin–Sharp	+ 9' 28"

== Stage 17 ==
17 July 2013 — Embrun to Chorges, 32 km (19.9 mi), individual time trial (ITT)

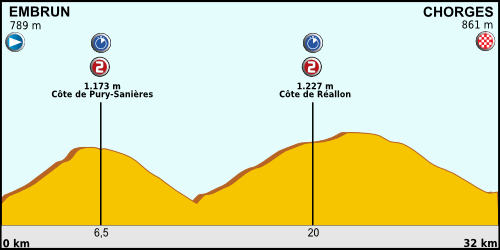
Stage profile

Stage 17 result

Rank	Rider	Team	Time
1	Chris Froome (GBR)	Team Sky	51' 33"
2	Alberto Contador (ESP)	Saxo–Tinkoff	+ 9"
3	Joaquim Rodríguez (ESP)	Team Katusha	+ 10"
4	Roman Kreuziger (CZE)	Saxo–Tinkoff	+ 23"
5	Alejandro Valverde (ESP)	Movistar Team	+ 30"
6	Nairo Quintana (COL)	Movistar Team	+ 1' 11"
7	Michał Kwiatkowski (POL)	Omega Pharma–Quick-Step	+ 1' 33"
8	Jakob Fuglsang (DEN)	Astana	+ 1' 34"
9	Andrew Talansky (USA)	Garmin–Sharp	+ 1' 41"
10	Tejay van Garderen (USA)	BMC Racing Team	+ 1' 51"

General classification after stage 17

Rank	Rider	Team	Time
1	Chris Froome (GBR)	Team Sky	66h 07' 09"
2	Alberto Contador (ESP)	Saxo–Tinkoff	+ 4' 34"
3	Roman Kreuziger (CZE)	Saxo–Tinkoff	+ 4' 51"
4	Bauke Mollema (NED)	Belkin Pro Cycling	+ 6' 23"
5	Nairo Quintana (COL)	Movistar Team	+ 6' 58"
6	Joaquim Rodríguez (ESP)	Team Katusha	+ 7' 21"
7	Laurens ten Dam (NED)	Belkin Pro Cycling	+ 8' 23"
8	Jakob Fuglsang (DEN)	Astana	+ 8' 56"
9	Michał Kwiatkowski (POL)	Omega Pharma–Quick-Step	+ 11' 10"
10	Dan Martin (IRL)	Garmin–Sharp	+ 12' 50"

== Stage 18 ==
18 July 2013 — Gap to Alpe d'Huez, 172.5 km (107.2 mi)

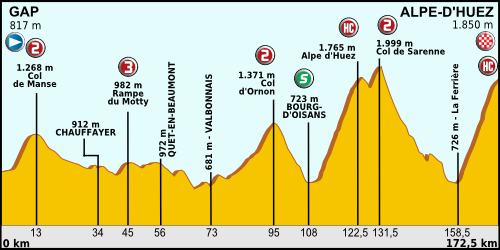
Stage profile

The queen stage of the 2013 Tour de France saw the riders contest six categorised climbs on the day: the Col de Manse, the Rampe du Motty, the Col d'Ormon, the first ascent of the Alpe d'Huez, the Col de Sarenne, and finally a second ascent up Alpe d'Huez.

The day began with a breakaway of nine riders at around the 17 km (10.6 mi) mark and consisted of the following riders: Jens Voigt (RadioShack–Leopard), Arnold Jeannesson (FDJ.fr), Christophe Riblon (Ag2r–La Mondiale), Andrey Amador (Movistar Team), Sylvain Chavanel (Omega Pharma–Quick-Step), Lars Boom (Belkin Pro Cycling), Tom Danielson (Garmin–Sharp), Tejay van Garderen (BMC Racing Team), and Moreno Moser (Cannondale). By the 35 km (21.7 mi) mark, they had extended their advantage over the peloton to 5' 40". Van Garderen would attack his leading companions at the foot of the first ascent of Alpe d'Huez, with only Moser and Riblon able to keep pace and caught up with him 1 km (0.6 mi) away from the top of the climb. Despite multiple mishaps – van Garderen's chain fell on the descent of the Sarenne and Riblon went off the road – the three leaders were firmly in the lead at the base of the second climb of Alpe d'Huez. Once again, van Garderen attacked at the base of the climb and quickly distanced himself from his leading companions. Riblon, despite being down 40 seconds to van Garderen at one point, would claw his way back up and passed him with 2.4 km (1.5 mi) to go, and ultimately won the only stage by a French rider in the 2013 Tour.

Back in the peloton, major changes were occurring in the general classification. Belkin Pro Cycling riders Bauke Mollema and Laurens ten Dam both cracked at the beginning of the climb and slid a couple of places on the leaderboard. Nairo Quintana (Movistar Team) attacked the group and was followed closely by Team Sky's Chris Froome and Richie Porte as well as Team Katusha's Joaquim Rodríguez. The Saxo–Tinkoff trio of Alberto Contador, Roman Kreuziger, and Michael Rogers were unable to follow and would lose significant amounts of time. With 5 km (3.1 mi) to go, Froome and Porte would lose contact with Quintana and Rodríguez; at which point Porte dropped back to the team car to illegally get energy gels for his leader, then paced him to the end of the climb to limit his losses to Quintana and Rodríguez. Porte and Froome each received a 20-second time penalty and a fine of 200 Swiss francs for the infringement.

Stage 18 result

Rank	Rider	Team	Time
1	Christophe Riblon (FRA)	Ag2r–La Mondiale	4h 51' 32"
2	Tejay van Garderen (USA)	BMC Racing Team	+ 59"
3	Moreno Moser (ITA)	Cannondale	+ 1' 27"
4	Nairo Quintana (COL)	Movistar Team	+ 2' 12"
5	Joaquim Rodríguez (ESP)	Team Katusha	+ 2' 15"
6	Richie Porte (AUS)	Team Sky	+ 3' 18"
7	Chris Froome (GBR)	Team Sky	+ 3' 18"
8	Alejandro Valverde (ESP)	Movistar Team	+ 3' 22"
9	Mikel Nieve (ESP)	Euskaltel–Euskadi	+ 4' 15"
10	Jakob Fuglsang (DEN)	Astana	+ 4' 15"

General classification after stage 18

Rank	Rider	Team	Time
1	Chris Froome (GBR)	Team Sky	71h 02' 19"
2	Alberto Contador (ESP)	Saxo–Tinkoff	+ 5' 11"
3	Nairo Quintana (COL)	Movistar Team	+ 5' 32"
4	Roman Kreuziger (CZE)	Saxo–Tinkoff	+ 5' 44"
5	Joaquim Rodríguez (ESP)	Team Katusha	+ 5' 58"
6	Bauke Mollema (NED)	Belkin Pro Cycling	+ 8' 58"
7	Jakob Fuglsang (DEN)	Astana	+ 9' 33"
8	Michael Rogers (AUS)	Saxo–Tinkoff	+ 14' 26"
9	Michał Kwiatkowski (POL)	Omega Pharma–Quick-Step	+ 14' 38"
10	Laurens ten Dam (NED)	Belkin Pro Cycling	+ 14' 39"

== Stage 19 ==
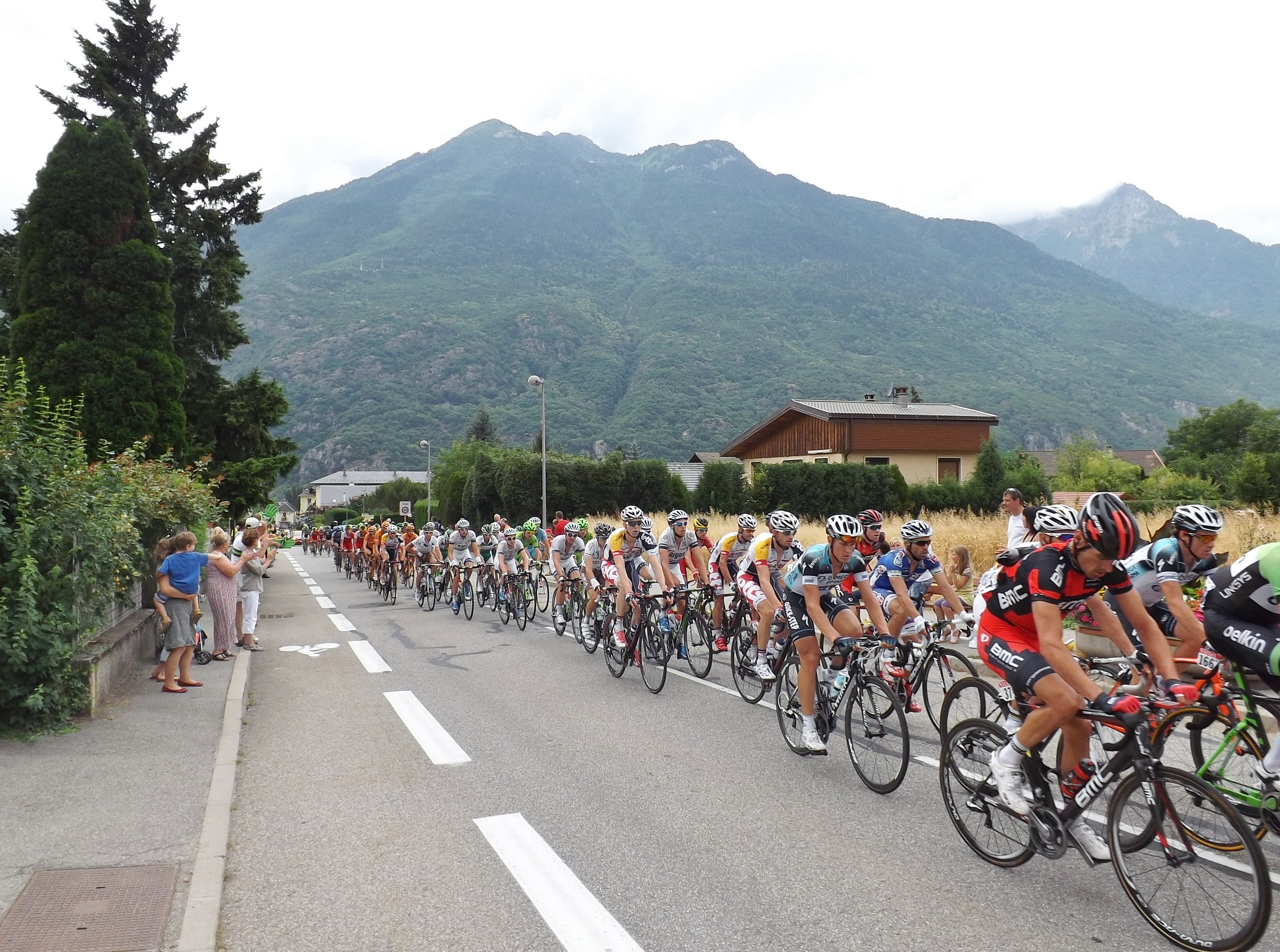
Peloton in La Chambre

19 July 2013 — Le Bourg-d'Oisans to Le Grand-Bornand, 204.5 km (127.1 mi)

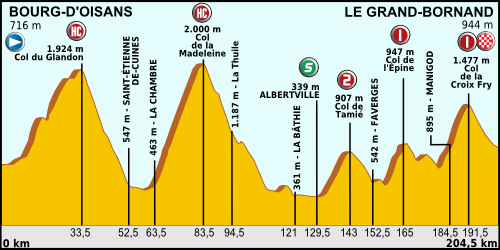
Stage profile

Stage 19 result

Rank	Rider	Team	Time
1	Rui Costa (POR)	Movistar Team	5h 59' 01"
2	Andreas Klöden (GER)	RadioShack–Leopard	+ 48"
3	Jan Bakelants (BEL)	RadioShack–Leopard	+ 1' 44"
4	Alexandre Geniez (FRA)	FDJ.fr	+ 1' 52"
5	Daniel Navarro (ESP)	Cofidis	+ 1' 55"
6	Bart De Clercq (BEL)	Lotto–Belisol	+ 1' 58"
7	Robert Gesink (NED)	Belkin Pro Cycling	+ 2' 03"
8	Alessandro De Marchi (ITA)	Cannondale	+ 2' 05"
9	Mikel Nieve (ESP)	Euskaltel–Euskadi	+ 2' 16"
10	Rubén Plaza (ESP)	Movistar Team	+ 2' 44"

General classification after stage 19

Rank	Rider	Team	Time
1	Chris Froome (GBR)	Team Sky	77h 10' 00"
2	Alberto Contador (ESP)	Saxo–Tinkoff	+ 5' 11"
3	Nairo Quintana (COL)	Movistar Team	+ 5' 32"
4	Roman Kreuziger (CZE)	Saxo–Tinkoff	+ 5' 44"
5	Joaquim Rodríguez (ESP)	Team Katusha	+ 5' 58"
6	Bauke Mollema (NED)	Belkin Pro Cycling	+ 8' 58"
7	Jakob Fuglsang (DEN)	Astana	+ 9' 33"
8	Daniel Navarro (ESP)	Cofidis	+ 12' 33"
9	Alejandro Valverde (ESP)	Movistar Team	+ 14' 56"
10	Michał Kwiatkowski (POL)	Omega Pharma–Quick-Step	+ 16' 08"

== Stage 20 ==
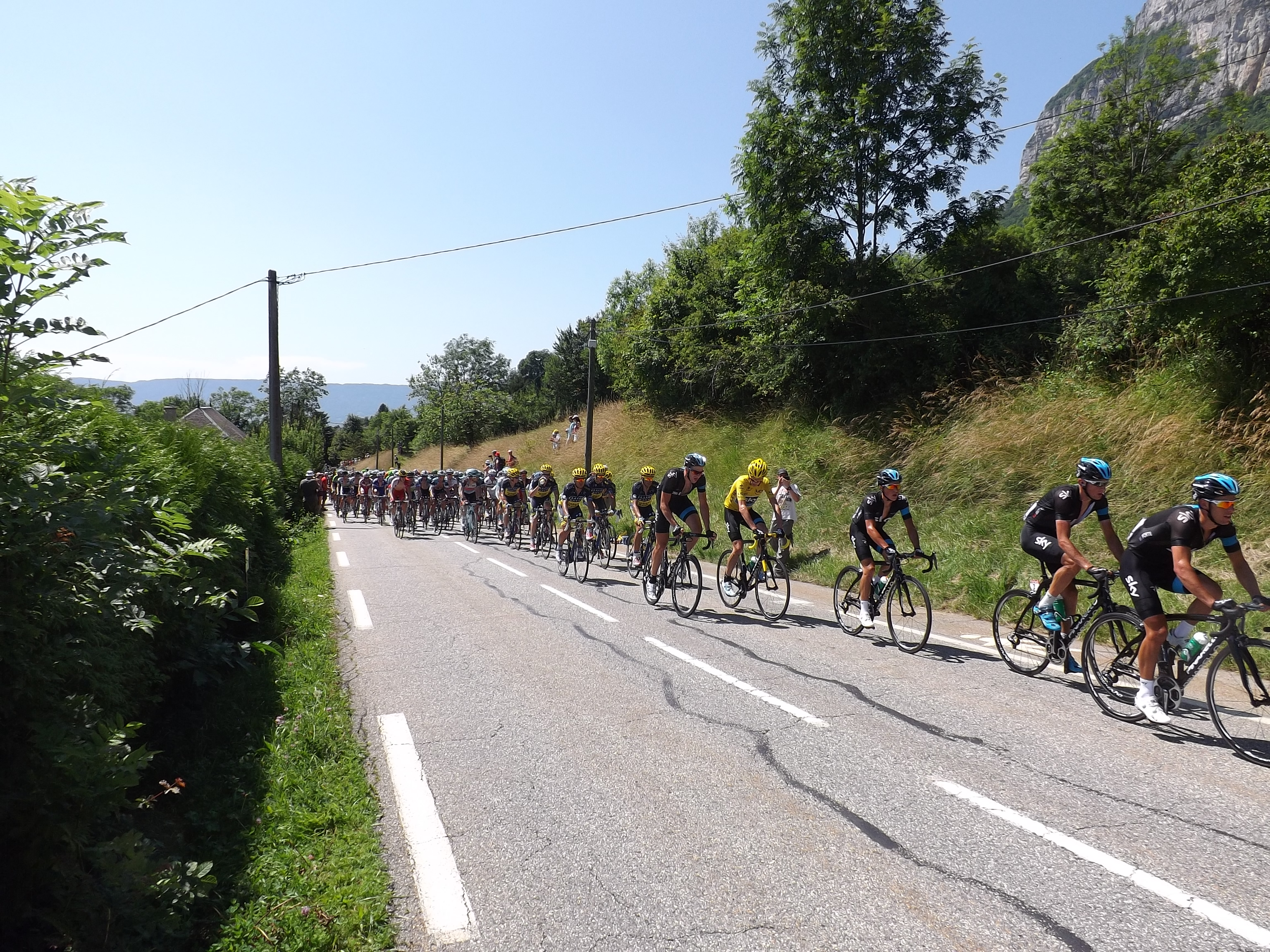
Team Sky leading the peloton (Saint-Jean-d'Arvey)

20 July 2013 — Annecy to Mont Semnoz, 125 km (77.7 mi)

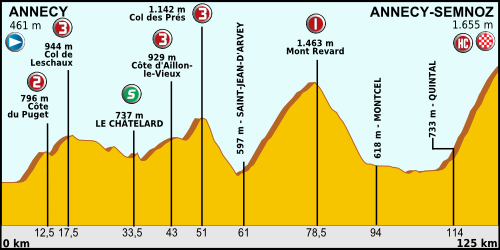
Stage profile

Stage 20 result

Rank	Rider	Team	Time
1	Nairo Quintana (COL)	Movistar Team	3h 39' 04"
2	Joaquim Rodríguez (ESP)	Team Katusha	+ 18"
3	Chris Froome (GBR)	Team Sky	+ 29"
4	Alejandro Valverde (ESP)	Movistar Team	+ 1' 42"
5	Richie Porte (AUS)	Team Sky	+ 2' 17"
6	Andrew Talansky (USA)	Garmin–Sharp	+ 2' 27"
7	Alberto Contador (ESP)	Saxo–Tinkoff	+ 2' 28"
8	John Gadret (FRA)	Ag2r–La Mondiale	+ 2' 48"
9	Jesús Hernández (ESP)	Saxo–Tinkoff	+ 2' 55"
10	Roman Kreuziger (CZE)	Saxo–Tinkoff	+ 2' 55"

General classification after stage 20

Rank	Rider	Team	Time
1	Chris Froome (GBR)	Team Sky	80h 49' 33"
2	Nairo Quintana (COL)	Movistar Team	+ 5' 03"
3	Joaquim Rodríguez (ESP)	Team Katusha	+ 5' 47"
4	Alberto Contador (ESP)	Saxo–Tinkoff	+ 7' 10"
5	Roman Kreuziger (CZE)	Saxo–Tinkoff	+ 8' 10"
6	Bauke Mollema (NED)	Belkin Pro Cycling	+ 12' 25"
7	Jakob Fuglsang (DEN)	Astana	+ 13' 00"
8	Alejandro Valverde (ESP)	Movistar Team	+ 16' 09"
9	Daniel Navarro (ESP)	Cofidis	+ 16' 35"
10	Andrew Talansky (USA)	Garmin–Sharp	+ 18' 22"

== Stage 21 ==
21 July 2013 — Versailles to Paris, 133.5 km (83.0 mi)

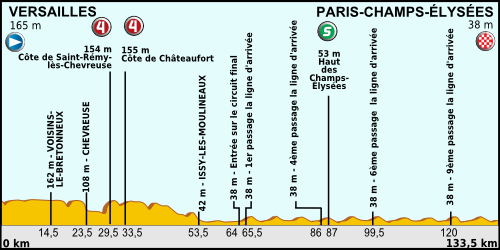
Stage profile

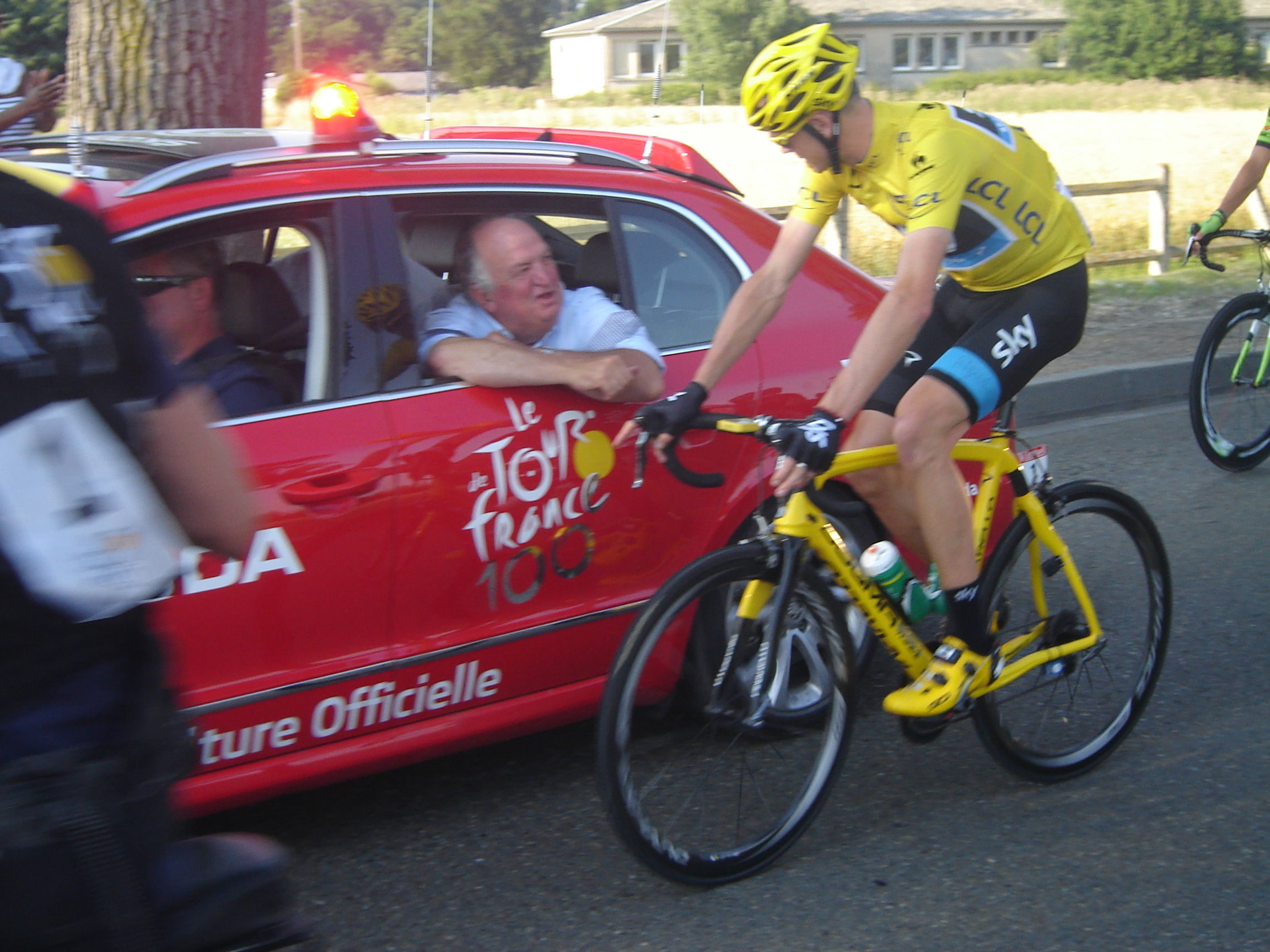
Overall winner Chris Froome

Stage 21 result

Rank	Rider	Team	Time
1	Marcel Kittel (GER)	Argos–Shimano	3h 06' 14"
2	André Greipel (GER)	Lotto–Belisol	s.t.
3	Mark Cavendish (GBR)	Omega Pharma–Quick-Step	s.t.
4	Peter Sagan (SVK)	Cannondale	s.t.
5	Roberto Ferrari (ITA)	Lampre–Merida	s.t.
6	Alexander Kristoff (NOR)	Team Katusha	s.t.
7	Kévin Reza (FRA)	Team Europcar	s.t.
8	Yohann Gène (FRA)	Team Europcar	s.t.
9	Daniele Bennati (ITA)	Saxo–Tinkoff	s.t.
10	Murilo Fischer (BRA)	FDJ.fr	s.t.

Final General Classification

Rank	Rider	Team	Time
1	Chris Froome (GBR)	Team Sky	83h 56' 40"
2	Nairo Quintana (COL)	Movistar Team	+ 4' 20"
3	Joaquim Rodríguez (ESP)	Team Katusha	+ 5' 04"
4	Alberto Contador (ESP)	Saxo–Tinkoff	+ 6' 27"
5	Roman Kreuziger (CZE)	Saxo–Tinkoff	+ 7' 27"
6	Bauke Mollema (NED)	Belkin Pro Cycling	+ 11' 42"
7	Jakob Fuglsang (DEN)	Astana	+ 12' 17"
8	Alejandro Valverde (ESP)	Movistar Team	+ 15' 26"
9	Daniel Navarro (ESP)	Cofidis	+ 15' 52"
10	Andrew Talansky (USA)	Garmin–Sharp	+ 17' 39"
