= Col de Manse =

Mountain pass in Hautes-Alpes, France

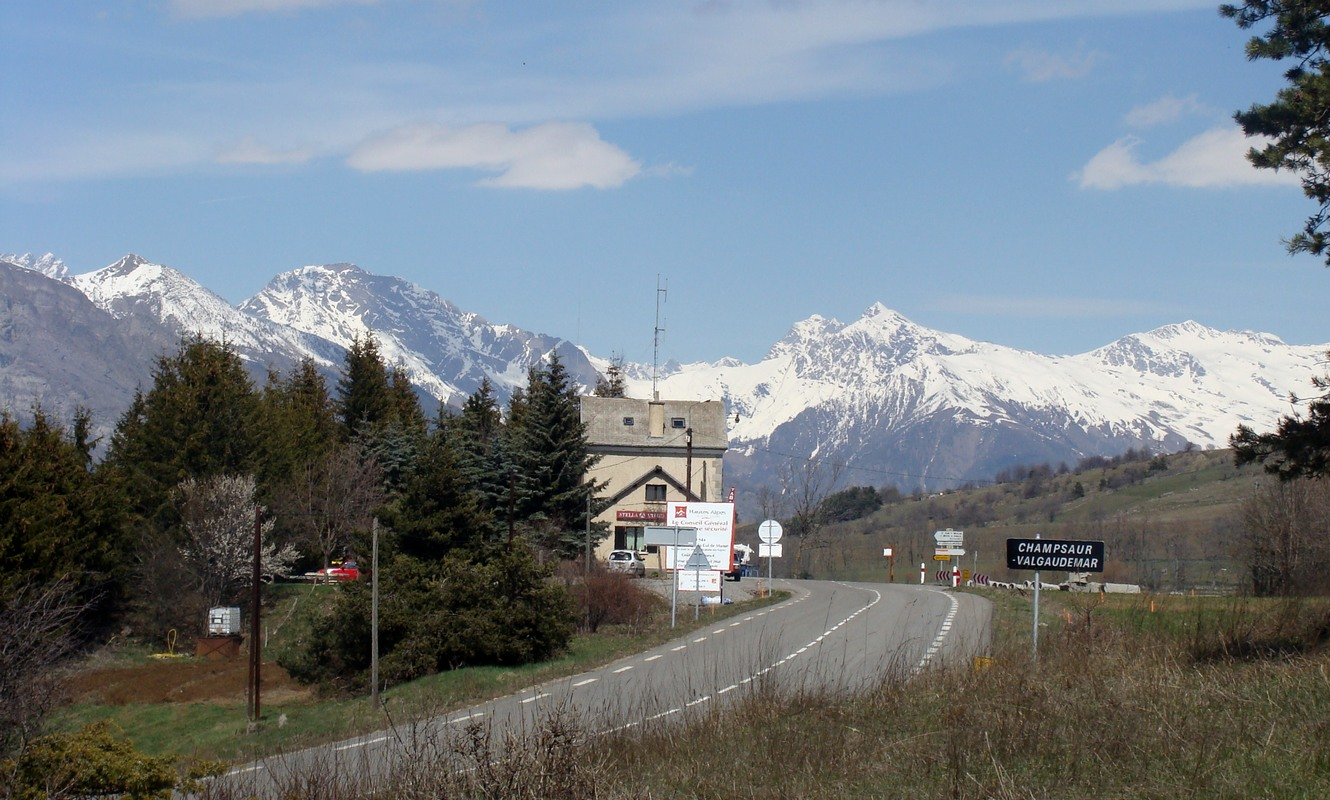
- Col de Manse from the south

- Location within Alps
- Elevation: 1,268 metres (4,160 ft)
- Traversed by: D944

Third Approach
- Location: Hautes-Alpes, France
- Range: Massif des Écrins, Dauphiné Alps
- Coordinates: 44°36′38″N 6°7′41″E

The Col de Manse (1,268 m (4,160 ft)) is a mountain pass located in the Massif des Écrins approximately 9 km (6 mi) north-east of Gap in the Hautes-Alpes department of France. The pass connects Gap with the high Champsaur valley and the ski resort of Orcières-Merlette. The road over the col is used occasionally by the Tour de France cycle race with the tour crossing the pass twice in 2013.

== Refuge Napoleon ==
At the summit there is a "Refuge Napoleon" — this is one of six such refuges built in the region in 1857–1858 with funds provided by Emperor Napoleon from his estate to provide shelter for travellers. Napoleon's will provided 50,000 Francs in gratitude for the welcome he had received from the local population on his return from Elba in 1815.

== Details of the climb ==
From Gap, the climb is approached via the RN85 (Route Napoléon), which it leaves shortly before the Col Bayard to join the D944. From this direction, the climb is 9.4 km (5.8 mi) long gaining 528 m (1,732 ft) in height at an average gradient of 5.6%. This is the route used in Stage 16 of the 2013 Tour de France from Vaison-la-Romaine to Gap.

From the south-east the col can be reached from the village of La Bâtie-Neuve on the RN94, from where the climb is 8.5 km (5.3 mi) long climbing 416 m (1,365 ft) at an average of 4.9%. This is the route taken on Stage 18 of the 2013 Tour de France shortly after leaving Gap en route to Alpe d'Huez.

== Tour de France ==
The Col de Manse was first passed by the Tour de France on Stage 12 of the 1971 race when it was an uncategorized climb on the descent from Orcières-Merlette en route to Marseille. It was crossed again twice in the following year when it was ranked as a Category 3 and Category 4 climb. In 1989, it was crossed on Stage 15, which was an individual time trial between Gap and Orcières-Merlette (39 km (24 mi)).

On Stage 9 of the 2003 race, Joseba Beloki and Lance Armstrong were descending from the Cote de La Rochette when, after passing the Col de Manse, Beloki locked his wheel on the melting road surface, flying out of control, and falling on his head, shoulder, and hip. Armstrong, who was immediately behind Beloki, swerved off the road through a field, getting off his bike, hopping over a small embankment, and resuming the chase to the finish in Gap.

The descent was used again on Stage 16 of the 2011 race. On the ascent, Alberto Contador made two attacks, the second of which was successful, with Cadel Evans and Samuel Sánchez joining him in taking a time advantage on the stage over the other riders in contention for high placings in the general classification, and more than a minute over Andy Schleck. Andy Schleck later criticized the use of such a technically testing descent so close to the finish of a stage.

On Stage 16 of the 2015 Tour, Warren Barguil (Team Giant-Alpecin) lost control approaching a hairpin bend on the descent of the Col de Manse and collided with Geraint Thomas, causing Thomas to crash head first into a telegraph pole and fall into a ditch. However Thomas escaped serious injury, and was able to complete the stage and lost just 38 seconds to the leading group.

=== Appearances in Tour de France ===
Year	Stage	Category	Start	Finish	Leader at the summit
2024	18	3	Gap	Barcelonnette	Oier Lazkano (ESP)
2015	16	2	Bourg-de-Péage	Gap	Rubén Plaza (ESP)
2013	18	2	Gap	Alpe d'Huez	Ryder Hesjedal (CAN)
2013	16	2	Vaison-la-Romaine	Gap	Rui Costa (POR)
2011	16	2	Saint-Paul-Trois-Châteaux	Gap	Ryder Hesjedal (CAN)
1989	15	1 (ITT)	Gap	Orcières-Merlette	Steven Rooks (NED)
1972	13	4	Orcières-Merlette	Briançon	Rik Van Linden (BEL)
1972	12	3	Carpentras	Orcières-Merlette	Joachim Agostinho (POR)
1971	12	Uncategorized	Orcières-Merlette	Marseille	
