= May 2011 in sports =

<<	May 2011					>>
Su	Mo	Tu	We	Th	Fr	Sa
1	2	3	4	5	6	7
8	9	10	11	12	13	14
15	16	17	18	19	20	21
22	23	24	25	26	27	28
29	30	31
Sports

This list shows notable sports-related deaths, events, and notable outcomes that occurred in May of 2011.

== Deaths in May ==
- 1: Henry Cooper
- 1: Ted Lowe
- 7: Seve Ballesteros
- 8: Lionel Rose
- 9: Wouter Weylandt
- 13: Derek Boogaard
- 15: Samuel Wanjiru
- 17: Harmon Killebrew
- 27: Margo Dydek
- 29: Bill Roycroft

== Current sporting seasons ==
=== Australian rules football 2011 ===
- Australian Football League

=== Auto racing 2011 ===
- Formula One
- Sprint Cup
- Nationwide Series
- Camping World Truck Series
- IRL IndyCar Series
- World Rally Championship
- WTTC
- V8 Supercar
- Formula Two
- GP2 Series
- GP3 Series
- American Le Mans
- Le Mans Series
- Rolex Sports Car Series
- FIA GT1 World Championship
- Auto GP
- World Series by Renault
- Deutsche Tourenwagen Masters
- Super GT

=== Baseball 2011 ===
- Major League Baseball
- Nippon Professional Baseball

=== Basketball 2011 ===
- NBA
  - NBA playoffs
- Euroleague
- EuroChallenge
- France
- Germany
- Greece
- Iran
- Israel
- Italy
- Philippines
  - Commissioner's Cup
- Russia
- Spain
- Turkey

=== Cricket 2011 ===
- England:
  - County Championship
  - Clydesdale Bank 40
- India:
  - Premier League

=== Darts 2011 ===
- Premier League

=== Football (soccer) 2011 ===
National teams competitions

- UEFA Euro 2012 qualifying
- 2012 Africa Cup of Nations qualification

International clubs competitions

- UEFA (Europe) Champions League
- UEFA Europa League
- UEFA Women's Champions League
- Copa Libertadores (South America)
- AFC (Asia) Champions League
- AFC Cup
- CAF (Africa) Champions League
- CAF Confederation Cup

Domestic (national) competitions

- Argentina
- Brazil
- England
- France
- Germany
- Iran
- Italy
- Japan
- Norway
- Portugal
- Russia
- Scotland
- Spain
- Major League Soccer (USA & Canada)
- Women's Professional Soccer (USA)

=== Golf 2011 ===
- PGA Tour
- European Tour
- LPGA Tour
- Champions Tour

=== Ice hockey 2011 ===
- National Hockey League
  - Stanley Cup playoffs
- Canadian Hockey League:
  - OHL, QMJHL, WHL
  - Memorial Cup

=== Motorcycle racing 2011 ===
- Moto GP
- Superbike World Championship
- Supersport World Championship

=== Rugby league 2011 ===
- Super League
- NRL

=== Rugby union 2011 ===
- Heineken Cup
- European Challenge Cup
- English Premiership
- Celtic League
- Top 14
- Super Rugby
- Sevens World Series

=== Tennis 2011 ===
- ATP World Tour
- WTA Tour

=== Volleyball 2011 ===
National teams competitions

- World League
- Men's European League
- Women's European League

Domestic (national) competitions

- Puerto Rican Women's League
- Iranian Men's Super League

== Days of the month ==
=== May 31, 2011 (Tuesday) ===
==== Basketball ====
- FIBA Asia Champions Cup in Pasig, Philippines: (teams in **bold** advance to the quarterfinals)
  - Group A:
    - KL Dragons (Malaysia) 77–101 (Jordan) **ASU Sports**
    - **Smart Gilas** (Philippines) 74–64 (Iraq) **Duhok Sports Club**
      - Standings: Smart Gilas, ASU Sports 6 points (3 matches), Duhok Sports Club 5 (4), (Saudi Arabia) Al-Ittihad Jeddah 4 (3), KL Dragons 3 (3).
  - Group B:
    - **Al-Jalaa Aleppo** (Syria) 93–63 (United Arab Emirates) Al Shabab
    - **Al-Rayyan** (Qatar) 73–78 (OT) (Lebanon) **Al-Riyadi Beirut**
      - Standings: Al-Riyadi Beirut 6 points (3 matches), (Iran) **Mahram Tehran**, Al-Rayyan Sports 5 (3), Al-Jalaa Aleppo 4 (3), Al-Shabab Club 4 (4).
- (United States) NBA Finals (best-of-7 series):
  - Game 1 in Miami: Miami Heat 92, Dallas Mavericks 84. Heat lead series 1–0.

==== Ice hockey ====
- The NHL's Atlanta Thrashers have been sold to a Winnipeg-based group that will move the team to that city for the 2011–12 season. The league's owners are expected to ratify the deal at their next scheduled meeting on June 21. The move brings the NHL back to Winnipeg for the first time since the Jets left for Phoenix in 1996, and also makes Atlanta the first city to lose two NHL teams in the league's modern era.

==== Tennis ====
- French Open in Paris, France, day 10:
  - Men's singles:
    - Fourth round: **Andy Murray** (GBR) [4] def. Viktor Troicki (SRB) [15] 4–6, 4–6, 6–3, 6–2, 7–5
    - Quarterfinals:
      - **Novak Djokovic** (SRB) [2] def. Fabio Fognini (ITA) walkover
      - **Roger Federer** (SUI) [3] def. Gaël Monfils (FRA) [9] 6–4, 6–3, 7–6(3)
  - Women's singles – quarterfinals:
    - **Francesca Schiavone** (ITA) [5] def. Anastasia Pavlyuchenkova (RUS) [14] 1–6, 7–5, 7–5
    - **Marion Bartoli** (FRA) [11] def. Svetlana Kuznetsova (RUS) [13] 7–6(4), 6–4

=== May 30, 2011 (Monday) ===
==== Basketball ====
- FIBA Asia Champions Cup in Pasig, Philippines: (teams in **bold** advance to the quarterfinals)
  - Group A:
    - **ASU Sports** (Jordan) 79–69 (Saudi Arabia) Al-Ittihad Jeddah
    - Duhok Sports Club (Iraq) 88–76 (Malaysia) KL Dragons
      - Standings: (Philippines) **Smart Gilas**, ASU Sports 4 points (2 matches), Al-Ittihad Jeddah, Duhok Sports Club 4 (3), KL Dragons 2 (2).
  - Group B:
    - **Al-Riyadi Beirut** (Lebanon) 76–73 (Iran) **Mahram Tehran**
    - Al Shabab (United Arab Emirates) 60–78 (Qatar) **Al-Rayyan**
      - Standings: Mahram Tehran 5 points (3 matches), Al-Rayyan Sports, Al-Riyadi Beirut 4 (2), Al-Shabab Club 3 (3), (Syria) Al-Jalaa Aleppo 2 (2).

==== Cricket ====
- Sri Lanka in England:
  - 1st Test in Cardiff; day 5: Sri Lanka 400 & 82 (24.4 overs); England 496/5d (155 overs; Ian Bell 103*). **England win by an innings & 14 runs; lead 3-match series 1–0.**
- Pakistan in Ireland:
  - 2nd ODI in Belfast: Ireland 238/8 (50 overs; Paul Stirling 109); Pakistan 242/5 (48.4 overs). **Pakistan win by 5 wickets; win 2-match series 2–0.**

==== Football (soccer) ====
- UEFA Women's U-19 Championship in Italy:
  - Group A:
    - Italy 2–1 Russia in Imola
    - Switzerland 4–1 Belgium in Bellaria
  - Group B:
    - Germany 3–1 Norway in Cervia
    - Spain 1–1 Netherlands in Forlì

==== Motorcycle racing ====
- Superbike:
  - Miller World Championship round in Tooele, Utah, United States:
    - Race 1: (1) Carlos Checa (ESP) (Ducati 1198) (2) Jakub Smrž (CZE) (Ducati 1198) (3) Sylvain Guintoli (FRA) (Ducati 1198)
    - Race 2: (1) Checa (2) Leon Camier (GBR) (Aprilia RSV4) (3) Max Biaggi (ITA) (Aprilia RSV4)
      - Riders' championship standings (after 5 of 13 rounds): (1) Checa 195 points (2) Marco Melandri (ITA) (Yamaha YZF-R1) 134 (3) Biaggi 133

==== Tennis ====
- French Open in Paris, France, day 9:
  - Men's singles, fourth round:
    - **Rafael Nadal** (ESP) [1] def. Ivan Ljubičić (CRO) 7–5, 6–3, 6–3
    - Andy Murray (GBR) [4] vs. Viktor Troicki (SRB) [15] 4–6, 4–6, 6–3, 6–2 (match suspended)
    - **Robin Söderling** (SWE) [5] def. Gilles Simon (FRA) [18] 6–2, 6–3, 7–6(5)
    - **Gaël Monfils** (FRA) [9] def. David Ferrer (ESP) [7] 6–4, 2–6, 7–5, 1–6, 8–6
    - **Juan Ignacio Chela** (ARG) def. Alejandro Falla (COL) 4–6, 6–2, 1–6, 7–6(5), 6–2
  - Women's singles, fourth round:
    - **Victoria Azarenka** (BLR) [4] def. Ekaterina Makarova (RUS) 6–2, 6–3
    - **Li Na** (CHN) [6] def. Petra Kvitová (CZE) [9] 2–6, 6–1, 6–3
    - **Maria Sharapova** (RUS) [7] def. Agnieszka Radwańska (POL) [12] 7–6(4), 7–5
    - **Andrea Petkovic** (GER) [15] def. Maria Kirilenko (RUS) [25] 6–2, 2–6, 6–4

=== May 29, 2011 (Sunday) ===
==== Auto racing ====
- Formula One:
  - Monaco Grand Prix in Monte Carlo, Monaco: (1) Sebastian Vettel (GER) (Red Bull–Renault) (2) Fernando Alonso (ESP) (Ferrari) (3) Jenson Button (GBR) (McLaren–Mercedes)
    - Drivers' championship standings (after 6 of 19 races): (1) Vettel 143 points (2) Lewis Hamilton (GBR) (McLaren-Mercedes) 85 (3) Mark Webber (AUS) (Red Bull-Renault) 79
- Sprint Cup Series:
  - Coca-Cola 600 in Concord, North Carolina: (1) (California) Kevin Harvick (Chevrolet; Richard Childress Racing) (2) (Georgia (U.S. state)) David Ragan (Ford; Roush Fenway Racing) (3) (Connecticut) Joey Logano (Toyota; Joe Gibbs Racing)
    - Drivers' championship standings (after 12 of 36 races): (1) (Missouri) Carl Edwards (Ford; Roush Fenway Racing) 445 points (2) Harvick 409 (3) (California) Jimmie Johnson (Chevrolet; Hendrick Motorsports) 408
- IndyCar Series:
  - 95th Indianapolis 500 Mile Race in Speedway, Indiana: (1) Dan Wheldon (GBR) (Bryan Herta Autosport) (2) J. R. Hildebrand (USA) (Panther Racing) (3) Graham Rahal (USA) (Chip Ganassi Racing)
    - Wheldon becomes the 18th driver to win multiple Indianapolis 500 races, assuming the lead on the final straight after Hildebrand crashes in the final corner.
    - Drivers' championship standings (after 5 of 17 races): (1) Will Power (AUS) (Team Penske) 194 points (2) Dario Franchitti (GBR) (Chip Ganassi Racing) 178 (3) Oriol Servià (ESP) (Newman/Haas Racing) 152
- World Rally Championship:
  - Rally Argentina in Villa Carlos Paz, Argentina: (1) Sébastien Loeb (FRA)/Daniel Elena (MON) (Citroën DS3 WRC) (2) Mikko Hirvonen (FIN)/Jarmo Lehtinen (FIN) (Ford Fiesta RS WRC) (3) Sébastien Ogier (FRA)/Julien Ingrassia (FRA) (Citroën DS3 WRC)
    - Drivers' championship standings (after 6 of 13 rallies): (1) Loeb 126 points (2) Hirvonen 113 (3) Ogier 96

==== Badminton ====
- Sudirman Cup in Qingdao, China:
  - Final: **China** 3–0 Denmark
    - China win the Cup for the fourth successive time and eighth time overall.

==== Basketball ====
- FIBA Asia Champions Cup in Pasig, Philippines:
  - Group A:
    - Al-Ittihad Jeddah (Saudi Arabia) 83–75 (Iraq) Duhok Sports Club
    - KL Dragons (Malaysia) 64–95 (Philippines) Smart Gilas
      - Standings: Smart Gilas 4 points (2 matches), Al-Ittihad Jeddah 3 (2), (Jordan) ASU Sports 2 (1), Duhok Sports Club 2 (2), KL Dragons 1 (1).
  - Group B:
    - Al-Rayyan (Qatar) 90–67 (Syria) Al-Jalaa Aleppo
    - Mahram Tehran (Iran) 90–73 (United Arab Emirates) Al Shabab
      - Standings: Mahram Tehran 4 points (2 matches), Al-Rayyan Sports, (Lebanon) Al-Riyadi Beirut 2 (1), Al-Shabab Club, Al-Jalaa Aleppo 2 (2).
- (Bulgaria) National Basketball League finals, game 2: Levski Sofia 73–88 Lukoil Academic. **Lukoil Academic win series 2–0.**
  - Lukoil Academic win the title for the ninth successive time and 21st time overall.

==== Cricket ====
- Sri Lanka in England:
  - 1st Test in Cardiff; day 4: Sri Lanka 400; England 491/5 (153 overs; Jonathan Trott 203, Alastair Cook 133). England lead by 91 runs with 5 wickets remaining in the 1st innings.

==== Cycling ====
- Grand Tours:
  - Giro d'Italia, Stage 21: (gold) David Millar (GBR) (Garmin–Cervélo) 30' 13" (silver) Alex Rasmussen (DEN) (HTC–Highroad) + 7" (bronze) Alberto Contador (ESP) (Saxo Bank–SunGard) + 36"
    - Final general classification: (1) Contador 84h 05' 14" (2) Michele Scarponi (ITA) (Lampre–ISD) + 6' 10" (3) Vincenzo Nibali (ITA) (Liquigas–Cannondale) + 6' 56"
      - Contador wins the Giro for the second time, and his sixth Grand Tour.
    - UCI World Tour standings (after 14 of 27 races): (1) Philippe Gilbert (BEL) (Omega Pharma–Lotto) 356 points (2) Contador 349 (3) Scarponi 348

==== Equestrianism ====
- Show Jumping – CSIO Piazza di Siena in Rome (CSIO 5*):
  - Grand Prix: (gold) Eric Lamaze (CAN) on Hickstead (silver) Michael Whitaker (GBR) on Amai (bronze) Jeroen Dubbeldam (NED) on Simon

==== Football (soccer) ====
- Nations Cup in Dublin, Republic of Ireland: Republic of Ireland 1–0 Scotland
  - Final standings: Republic of Ireland 9 points, Scotland 6 points, Wales 3, Northern Ireland 0.
    - The Republic of Ireland becomes the inaugural champion.
- Friendly international: (top 10 in FIFA World Rankings)
  - (4) Germany 2–1 (7) Uruguay
- CAF Confederation Cup Play-off for group stage, first leg:
  - ZESCO United (Zambia) 1–0 (Morocco) Maghreb de Fès
  - Inter Luanda (Angola) 3–0 (Morocco) Difaa El Jadida
  - ASEC Mimosas (Ivory Coast) 4–0 (Angola) 1º de Agosto
  - Club Africain (Tunisia) 3–0 (Kenya) Sofapaka
- Austrian Cup final in Vienna: **Ried** 2–0 Austria Lustenau
  - Ried win the Cup for the second time.
- (Belarus) Belarusian Cup final in Minsk: **Gomel** 2–0 Neman Grodno
  - Gomel win the Cup for the second time.
- (Italy) Coppa Italia Final in Rome: **Internazionale** 3–1 Palermo
  - Internazionale win the Cup for the second successive time, and seventh time overall.
- Luxembourg Cup final in Luxembourg City: F91 Dudelange 0–1 **FC Differdange 03**
  - Differdange win the Cup for the second successive time.
- (Switzerland) Swiss Cup final in Basel: Neuchâtel Xamax 0–2 **FC Sion**
  - Sion win the Cup for the twelfth time.

==== Golf ====
- Senior majors:
  - Senior PGA Championship presented by KitchenAid in Louisville, Kentucky:
    - Leaderboard after final round: (T1) David Eger (USA) & Tom Watson (USA) 278 (−10) (3) Kiyoshi Murota (JPN) 279 (−9)
    - Playoff: Watson 4 (−1) def. Eger 5 (E)
      - Watson wins his second Senior PGA title, his sixth senior major and 14th Champions Tour title. The 61-year-old Hall of Famer also becomes the oldest winner of a senior major since the creation of the Champions Tour in 1980.
- PGA Tour:
  - HP Byron Nelson Championship in Irving, Texas:
    - Winner: Keegan Bradley (USA) 277 (−3)^{PO}
      - Bradley defeats Ryan Palmer (USA) on the first playoff hole to win his first PGA Tour title.
- European Tour:
  - BMW PGA Championship in Virginia Water, Surrey, England:
    - Winner: Luke Donald (ENG) 278 (−6)^{PO}
      - Donald defeats Lee Westwood (ENG) on the first playoff hole to win his fifth European Tour title, and replaces Westwood at the top of the world rankings.
- LPGA Tour:
  - HSBC Brazil Cup in Rio de Janeiro, Brazil:
    - Winner: Mariajo Uribe (COL) 135 (−9)
      - In this unofficial event, Uribe wins her first professional title.

==== Gymnastics ====
- European Rhythmic Gymnastics Championships in Minsk, Belarus:
  - Senior hoop: (gold) Yevgeniya Kanayeva (RUS) 29.450 points (silver) Daria Kondakova (RUS) 29.025 (bronze) Liubov Charkashyna (BLR) 28.200
  - Senior ball: (gold) Charkashyna 28.450 points (silver) Kanayeva 28.350 (bronze) Daria Dmitrieva (RUS) 27.575
  - Senior clubs: (gold) Charkashyna 28.300 points (silver) Neta Rivkin (ISR) 27.900 (bronze) Alina Maksimenko (UKR) 27.525
  - Senior ribbon: (gold) Kanayeva 29.275 points (silver) Kondakova 29.075 (bronze) Silviya Miteva (BUL) 27.825
  - Junior groups: (gold) Russia 27.100 points (silver) Belarus 26.500 (bronze) Azerbaijan 25.825

==== Handball ====
- Champions League Final four in Cologne, Germany:
  - Third place game: Rhein-Neckar Löwen (Germany) 31–33 (Germany) **HSV Hamburg**
  - Final: **FC Barcelona** (Spain) 27–24 (Spain) BM Ciudad Real
    - Barcelona win the title for the eighth time.

==== Ice hockey ====
- Memorial Cup in Mississauga, Ontario:
  - Final: **Saint John Sea Dogs** 3, Mississauga St. Michael's Majors 1
    - The Sea Dogs win the Cup for the first time, becoming the sixth QMJHL team to win the tournament.

==== Rugby union ====
- IRB Sevens World Series:
  - Edinburgh Sevens at Murrayfield:
    - Shield: **Canada** 17–12 Russia
    - Bowl: Scotland 14–21 **Kenya**
    - Plate: **Fiji** 26–14 Samoa
    - Cup: Australia 35–36 **South Africa**
      - Final standings: (1) New Zealand 166 points (2) South Africa 140 (3) England 127
      - New Zealand win the title for the ninth time.

==== Tennis ====
- French Open in Paris, France, day 8:
  - Men's singles, fourth round:
    - **Novak Djokovic** (SRB) [2] def. Richard Gasquet (FRA) [13] 6–4, 6–4, 6–2
    - **Roger Federer** (SUI) [3] def. Stanislas Wawrinka (SUI) [14] 6–2, 6–3, 7–5
    - David Ferrer (ESP) [7] vs. Gaël Monfils (FRA) [9] 4–6, 6–2, 5–7, 2–0 (match suspended)
    - **Fabio Fognini** (ITA) def. Albert Montañés (ESP) 4–6, 6–4, 3–6, 6–3, 11–9
  - Women's singles, fourth round:
    - **Anastasia Pavlyuchenkova** (RUS) [14] def. Vera Zvonareva (RUS) [3] 7–6(4), 2–6, 6–2
    - **Francesca Schiavone** (ITA) [5] def. Jelena Janković (SRB) [10] 6–3, 2–6, 6–4
    - **Marion Bartoli** (FRA) [11] def. Gisela Dulko (ARG) 7–5, 1–0 retired
    - **Svetlana Kuznetsova** (RUS) [13] def. Daniela Hantuchová (SVK) [28] 7–6(6), 3–6, 6–2

==== Volleyball ====
- FIVB World League, Week 1:
  - Pool B: Bulgaria 3–2 Germany
    - Standings (after 2 matches): Russia 6 points, Bulgaria, Germany 3, Japan 0.
  - Pool C:
    - Portugal 3–1 Finland
    - Argentina 3–0 Serbia
      - Standings (after 2 matches): Portugal 5 points, Serbia, Argentina 3, Finland 1.
  - Pool D:
    - South Korea 1–3 Cuba
    - France 0–3 Italy
      - Standings (after 2 matches): Italy 6 points, South Korea, Cuba 3, France 0.
- Men's European Volleyball League, Leg 1:
  - Pool A:
    - Belgium 1–3 Slovenia
    - Great Britain 0–3 Croatia
      - Standings (after 2 matches): Slovenia 6 points, Croatia 4, Great Britain 2, Belgium 0.
  - Pool C: Turkey 3–0 Belarus
    - Standings (after 2 matches): Romania, Turkey, Slovakia, Belarus 3 points.
- Women's European Volleyball League, Leg 1:
  - Pool C: Turkey 3–0 Belarus
    - Standings (after 2 matches): Romania, Turkey 6 points, Belarus, Croatia 0.

=== May 28, 2011 (Saturday) ===
==== Auto racing ====
- Nationwide Series:
  - Top Gear 300 in Concord, North Carolina: (1) (Wisconsin) Matt Kenseth (Ford; Roush Fenway Racing) (2) (Missouri) Carl Edwards (Ford; Roush Fenway Racing) (3) (Nevada) Kyle Busch (Toyota; Joe Gibbs Racing)
    - Drivers' championship standings (after 13 of 34 races): (1) (Virginia) Elliott Sadler (Chevrolet; Kevin Harvick Incorporated) 452 points (2) (Mississippi) Ricky Stenhouse Jr. (Ford; Roush Fenway Racing) 451 (3) (Georgia (U.S. state)) Reed Sorenson (Chevrolet; Turner Motorsports) 450

==== Badminton ====
- Sudirman Cup in Qingdao, China:
  - Semifinals:
    - **China** 3–1 South Korea
    - **Denmark** 3–1 Indonesia

==== Basketball ====
- FIBA Asia Champions Cup in Pasig, Philippines:
  - Group A:
    - Duhok Sports Club (Iraq) 66–74 (Jordan) ASU Sports
    - Smart Gilas (Philippines) 101–69 (Saudi Arabia) Al-Ittihad Jeddah
  - Group B:
    - Al-Jalaa Aleppo (Syria) 59–86 (Iran) Mahram Tehran
    - Al Shabab (United Arab Emirates) 90–109 (Lebanon) Al-Riyadi Beirut

==== Cricket ====
- Sri Lanka in England:
  - 1st Test in Cardiff; day 3: Sri Lanka 400; England 287/2 (90 overs; Alastair Cook 129*, Jonathan Trott 125*). England trail by 113 runs with 8 wickets remaining in the 1st innings.
- Pakistan in Ireland:
  - 1st ODI in Belfast: Ireland 96 (20/36 overs); Pakistan 97/3 (27.3 overs). **Pakistan win by 7 wickets (D/L); lead 2-match series 1–0.**
- Indian Premier League playoff:
  - Final in Chennai: Chennai Super Kings 205/5 (20 overs); Royal Challengers Bangalore 147/8 (20 overs). **Chennai Super Kings win by 58 runs.**
    - The Super Kings retain their title, and become the first team to win the title twice.

==== Cycling ====
- Grand Tours:
  - Giro d'Italia, Stage 20: (gold) Vasil Kiryienka (BLR) (Movistar Team) 6h 17' 03" (silver) José Rujano (VEN) (Androni Giocattoli) + 4' 43" (bronze) Joaquim Rodríguez (ESP) (Team Katusha) + 4' 50"
    - General classification (after stage 20): (1) Alberto Contador (ESP) (Saxo Bank–SunGard) 83h 34' 25" (2) Michele Scarponi (ITA) (Lampre–ISD) + 5' 18" (3) Vincenzo Nibali (ITA) (Liquigas–Cannondale) + 6' 14"

==== Football (soccer) ====
- UEFA Champions League Final in London: **FC Barcelona** (Spain) 3–1 (England) Manchester United
  - Barcelona win the tournament for the second time in three years, and fourth time overall.
- Friendly women's international (top 10 in FIFA Women's World Rankings):
  - (6) Canada 2–0 Netherlands
- CAF Champions League Special play-off in Cairo, Egypt: **Wydad Casablanca** (Morocco) 3–0 (Tanzania) Simba
  - Wydad Casablanca advance to Group B in the Group stage.
- CAF Confederation Cup Play-off for group stage, first leg:
  - ES Sétif (Algeria) 1–0 (Nigeria) Kaduna United
  - Diaraf (Senegal) 1–1 (Algeria) JS Kabylie
- (South Africa) Nedbank Cup final in Mbombela: **Orlando Pirates** 3–1 Black Leopards
  - Orlando Pirates win the Cup for the third time.

==== Golf ====
- Senior majors:
  - Senior PGA Championship presented by KitchenAid in Louisville, Kentucky:
    - Leaderboard after second round: (1) Kiyoshi Murota (JPN) 133 (−11) (T2) Hale Irwin (USA) & Nick Price (ZIM) 137 (−7)
    - Leaderboard after third round: (T1) Irwin & Murota 207 (−9) (3) Tom Watson (USA) 208 (−8)

==== Gymnastics ====
- European Rhythmic Gymnastics Championships in Minsk, Belarus:
  - Senior teams: (gold) Russia (silver) Belarus (bronze) Ukraine

==== Handball ====
- Champions League Final four in Cologne, Germany:
  - Semifinals:
    - Rhein-Neckar Löwen (Germany) 28–30 (Spain) **FC Barcelona**
    - **BM Ciudad Real** (Spain) 28–23 (Germany) HSV Hamburg

==== Mixed martial arts ====
- UFC 130 in Las Vegas, United States:
  - Middleweight bout: **Brian Stann** (USA) def. Jorge Santiago (BRA) via KO (punches)
  - Welterweight bout: **Rick Story** (USA) def. Thiago Alves (BRA) via unanimous decision
  - Heavyweight bout: **Travis Browne** (USA) def. Stefan Struve (NLD) via KO (superman punch)
  - Heavyweight bout: **Frank Mir** (USA) def. Roy Nelson (USA) via unanimous decision
  - Light Heavyweight bout: **Quinton Jackson** (USA) def. Matt Hamill (USA) via unanimous decision

==== Rugby union ====
- IRB Junior World Trophy in Georgia:
  - Group A:
    - Samoa 37–6 Uruguay
    - Russia 42–36 United States
      - Standings (after 2 matches): Samoa 10 points, Russia 5, Uruguay 4, United States 2.
  - Group B:
    - Japan 30–15 Canada
    - Georgia 50–19 Zimbabwe
      - Standings (after 2 matches): Georgia, Japan 10 points, Canada, Zimbabwe 0.
- (England) Aviva Premiership Final in London: Leicester Tigers 18–22 **Saracens**
  - Saracens win the title for the first time.
- (Ireland) (Italy) (Scotland) (Wales) Celtic League Grand Final in Limerick: **Munster** 19–9 Leinster
  - Munster win the title for a record-equalling third time.
- (France) Top 14 semifinal in Marseille: Racing Métro 25–26 **Montpellier**

==== Tennis ====
- French Open in Paris, France, day 7:
  - Men's singles, third round:
    - **Rafael Nadal** (ESP) [1] def. Antonio Veić (CRO) 6–1, 6–3, 6–0
    - **Novak Djokovic** (SRB) [2] def. Juan Martín del Potro (ARG) [25] 6–3, 3–6, 6–3, 6–2
    - **Andy Murray** (GBR) [4] def. Michael Berrer (GER) 6–2, 6–3, 6–2
    - **Robin Söderling** (SWE) [5] def. Leonardo Mayer (ARG) 6–1, 6–4, 6–3
    - **Gilles Simon** (FRA) [18] def. Mardy Fish (USA) [10] 6–3, 6–4, 6–2
  - Women's singles, third round:
    - **Victoria Azarenka** (BLR) [4] def. Roberta Vinci (ITA) [30] 6–3, 6–2
    - **Li Na** (CHN) [6] def. Sorana Cîrstea (ROU) 6–2, 6–2
    - **Maria Sharapova** (RUS) [7] def. Chan Yung-jan (TPE) 6–2, 6–3
    - **Petra Kvitová** (CZE) [9] def. Vania King (USA) 6–4, 6–2

==== Volleyball ====
- FIVB World League, Week 1 (teams in bold advance to the final round):
  - Pool A:
    - **Poland** 0–3 United States
    - Puerto Rico 0–3 Brazil
      - Standings (after 2 matches): Brazil 6 points, Poland, United States 3, Puerto Rico 0.
  - Pool B:
    - Russia 3–1 Japan
    - Bulgaria 2–3 Germany
      - Standings: Russia 6 points (2 matches), Germany 2 (1), Bulgaria 1 (1), Japan 0 (2).
  - Pool C:
    - Argentina 0–3 Serbia
    - Portugal 3–2 Finland
  - Pool D: South Korea 3–0 Cuba
- Men's European Volleyball League, Leg 1:
  - Pool A:
    - Great Britain 3–2 Croatia
    - Belgium 1–3 Slovenia
  - Pool B:
    - Spain 3–0 Netherlands
    - Austria 1–3 Greece
      - Standings (after 2 matches): Greece 6 points, Spain, Netherlands 3, Austria 0.
  - Pool C:
    - Romania 1–3 Slovakia
    - Turkey 1–3 Belarus
      - Standings: Belarus 3 points (1 match), Romania, Slovakia 3 (2), Turkey 0 (1).
- Women's European Volleyball League, Leg 1:
  - Pool A:
    - Serbia 3–0 Greece
    - Spain 0–3 France
      - Standings (after 2 matches): Serbia 6 points, France, Spain 3, Greece 0.
  - Pool B:
    - Czech Republic 1–3 Bulgaria
    - Israel 1–3 Hungary
      - Standings (after 2 matches): Israel, Czech Republic, Bulgaria, Hungary 3 points.
  - Pool C:
    - Romania 3–1 Croatia
    - Turkey 3–1 Belarus
      - Standings: Romania 6 points (2 matches), Turkey 3 (1), Belarus 0 (1), Croatia 0 (2).

=== May 27, 2011 (Friday) ===
==== Badminton ====
- Sudirman Cup in Qingdao, China:
  - Quarterfinals:
    - **Denmark** 3–1 Chinese Taipei
    - Japan 2–3 **Indonesia**

==== Cricket ====
- Sri Lanka in England:
  - 1st Test in Cardiff; day 2: Sri Lanka 400 (118.4 overs; Prasanna Jayawardene 112); England 47/1 (20 overs). England trail by 353 runs with 9 wickets remaining in the 1st innings.
- Indian Premier League playoff:
  - Qualifier 2 in Chennai: Royal Challengers Bangalore 185/4 (20 overs); Mumbai Indians 142/8 (20 overs). **Royal Challengers Bangalore win by 43 runs.**

==== Cycling ====
- Grand Tours:
  - Giro d'Italia, Stage 19: (gold) Paolo Tiralongo (ITA) (Astana) 5h 26' 27" (silver) Alberto Contador (ESP) (Saxo Bank–SunGard) s.t. (bronze) Vincenzo Nibali (ITA) (Liquigas–Cannondale) + 3"
    - General classification (after stage 19): (1) Contador 77h 11' 24" (2) Michele Scarponi (ITA) (Lampre–ISD) + 5' 18" (3) Nibali + 5' 52"

==== Equestrianism ====
- FEI Nations Cup Show Jumping:
  - Nations Cup of Italy in Rome (CSIO 5*): (gold) Netherlands (Eric van der Vleuten, Harry Smolders, Gerco Schröder, Jeroen Dubbeldam) (silver) Belgium (Philippe Le Jeune, Dirk Demeersman, Judy-Ann Melchior, Jos Lansink) (bronze) Ireland (Shane Sweetnam, Shane Carey, Cameron Hanley, Billy Twomey)
    - Standings (standings after 2 of 8 events): (1) Ireland 16 points (2) Belgium 14 (3) Netherlands 13.5
- FEI Nations Cup Show Jumping – Promotional League, Europe:
  - Nations Cup of Portugal in Lisbon (CSIO 3*): (gold) Sweden (Erika Lickhammer, Lisen Bratt Fredriksson, Alexander Zetterman, Helena Persson) (silver) Switzerland (Martin Fuchs, Marc Oertly, Jessy Putallaz, Steve Guerdat) (bronze) France (Aldrick Cheronnet, Jerome Hurel, Eugenie Angot, Florian Angot) & Great Britain (Laura Renwick, Bruce Menzies, Matthew Sampson, William Funnell)
    - Standings (after 4 of 7 competitions): (1) Sweden 29.5 points (2) Switzerland 25.5 (3) Spain 25

==== Football (soccer) ====
- Nations Cup in Dublin, Republic of Ireland: Wales 2–0 Northern Ireland
  - Standings: Republic of Ireland, Scotland 6 points (2 matches), Wales 3 (3), Northern Ireland 0 (3).

==== Golf ====
- Senior majors:
  - Senior PGA Championship presented by KitchenAid in Louisville, Kentucky:
    - Leaderboard after first round: (1) Kiyoshi Murota (JPN) 66 (−6) (T2) Trevor Dodds (USA) & Nick Price (ZIM) 67 (−5)
    - Leaderboard after second day: (1) Murota 133 (−11) (T2) Hale Irwin (USA) & Price 137 (−7)
      - 31 players will complete their second round on May 28.

==== Ice hockey ====
- Stanley Cup playoffs:
  - Eastern Conference finals: (series best-of-7; seeds in parentheses)
    - Game seven in Boston: (3) Boston Bruins 1, (5) Tampa Bay Lightning 0. **Bruins win series 4–3**.
      - The Bruins advance to the Stanley Cup Final for the 18th time and first time since 1990.
- Memorial Cup in Mississauga, Ontario:
  - Semi-final: **Mississauga St. Michael's Majors** 3, Kootenay Ice 1

==== Rugby union ====
- (France) Top 14 semifinal in Marseille: **Toulouse** 29–6 Clermont

==== Tennis ====
- French Open in Paris, France, day 6:
  - Men's singles, third round:
    - Novak Djokovic (SRB) [2] vs. Juan Martín del Potro (ARG) [25] 6–3, 3–6 (match suspended)
    - **Roger Federer** (SUI) [3] def. Janko Tipsarević (SRB) [29] 6–1, 6–4, 6–3
    - **David Ferrer** (ESP) [7] def. Sergiy Stakhovsky (UKR) [31] 6–1, 6–1, 6–3
    - **Gaël Monfils** (FRA) [9] def. Steve Darcis (BEL) 6–3, 6–4, 7–5
  - Women's singles, third round:
    - **Daniela Hantuchová** (SVK) [28] def. Caroline Wozniacki (DEN) [1] 6–1, 6–3
    - **Vera Zvonareva** (RUS) [3] def. Anastasia Rodionova (AUS) 6–2, 6–3
    - **Francesca Schiavone** (ITA) [5] def. Peng Shuai (CHN) [29] 6–3, 1–2 retired
    - **Gisela Dulko** (ARG) def. Samantha Stosur (AUS) [8] 6–4, 1–6, 6–3
    - **Jelena Janković** (SRB) [10] def. Bethanie Mattek-Sands (USA) 6–2, 6–2

==== Volleyball ====
- FIVB World League, Week 1 (teams in bold advance to the final round):
  - Pool A:
    - **Poland** 3–0 United States
    - Puerto Rico 0–3 Brazil
  - Pool B: Russia 3–0 Japan
  - Pool D: France 0–3 Italy
- Men's European League, Leg 1:
  - Pool B: Spain 0–3 Netherlands
  - Pool C: Romania 3–0 Slovakia
- Women's European League, Leg 1:
  - Pool A:
    - Serbia 3–0 Greece
    - Spain 3–1 France
  - Pool B:
    - Israel 3–1 Hungary
    - Czech Republic 3–1 Bulgaria
  - Pool C: Romania 3–0 Croatia

=== May 26, 2011 (Thursday) ===
==== Athletics ====
- IAAF Diamond League:
  - Golden Gala in Rome, Italy:
    - Men:
      - 100m: Usain Bolt (JAM) 9.91
      - 200m: Andrew Howe (ITA) 20.31
      - 4 × 100 m relay: Canada 38.65
      - 400m: Chris Brown (BAH) 45.16
      - 400m hurdles: L. J. van Zyl (RSA) 47.91
      - 800m: Khadevis Robinson (USA) 1:45.09
      - 5000m: Imane Merga (ETH) 12:54.21
      - Triple jump: Phillips Idowu (GBR) 17.59m
      - Pole vault: Renaud Lavillenie (FRA) 5.82m
      - Shot put: Dylan Armstrong (CAN) 21.60m
    - Women:
      - 100m hurdles: Dawn Harper (USA) 12.70
      - 200m: Bianca Knight (USA) 22.64
      - 400m: Allyson Felix (USA) 49.81
      - 1500m: Maryam Yusuf Jamal (BHR) 4:01.60
      - 3000m steeplechase: Milcah Chemos Cheywa (KEN) 9:12.89
      - Long jump: Brittney Reese (USA) 6.94m
      - High jump: Blanka Vlašić (CRO) 1.95m
      - Discus throw: Sandra Perković (CRO) 65.56m
      - Javelin throw: Mariya Abakumova (RUS) 65.40m

==== Badminton ====
- Sudirman Cup in Qingdao, China:
  - Quarterfinals:
    - **South Korea** 3–2 Malaysia
    - **China** 3–1 India

==== Basketball ====
- NBA playoffs:
  - Eastern Conference finals: (series best-of-7; seeds in parentheses)
    - Game 5 in Chicago: (2) Miami Heat 83, (1) Chicago Bulls 80. **Heat win series 4–1**.
- (Austria) Österreichische Bundesliga finals, game 5: Allianz Swans Gmunden 75–77 Oberwart Gunners. **Oberwart Gunners win best-of-5 series 3–2.**
  - Oberwart Gunners win the title for the first time.
- (Israel) Israeli final four in Tel Aviv:
  - Third-place playoff: **Hapoel Jerusalem** 94–74 Maccabi Rishon LeZion
  - Final: **Maccabi Tel Aviv** 91–64 Hapoel Gilboa Galil
    - Maccabi Tel Aviv win the title for the 49th time.

==== Cricket ====
- Sri Lanka in England:
  - 1st Test in Cardiff; day 1: Sri Lanka 133/2 (48 overs); England.

==== Cycling ====
- Grand Tours:
  - Giro d'Italia, Stage 18: (gold) Eros Capecchi (ITA) (Liquigas–Cannondale) 3h 20' 38" (silver) Marco Pinotti (ITA) (HTC–Highroad) s.t. (bronze) Kevin Seeldraeyers (BEL) (Quick-Step) s.t.
    - General classification (after stage 18): (1) Alberto Contador (ESP) (Saxo Bank–SunGard) 71h 45' 09" (2) Michele Scarponi (ITA) (Lampre–ISD) + 4' 58" (3) Vincenzo Nibali (ITA) (Liquigas–Cannondale) + 5' 45"

==== Football (soccer) ====
- UEFA Women's Champions League Final in London: **Lyon** (France) 2–0 (Germany) Turbine Potsdam
  - Lyon becomes the first French team to win the title.
- Copa Libertadores semifinals, first leg: Peñarol (Uruguay) 1–0 (Argentina) Vélez Sarsfield
- (Canada) Canadian Championship final, second leg (first leg score in parentheses):
  - Toronto FC – (1–1) Vancouver Whitecaps — postponed to July 2 due to a waterlogged pitch.
- (Georgia (country)) Georgian Cup final in Tbilisi: **Gagra** 1–0 (a.e.t.) Torpedo Kutaisi
  - Gagra win the Cup for the first time.
- (Moldova) Moldovan Cup final in Chişinău: **Iskra-Stal** 2–1 Olimpia
  - Iskra-Stal win the Cup for the first time.

==== Golf ====
- Senior majors:
  - Senior PGA Championship presented by KitchenAid in Louisville, Kentucky:
    - Leaderboard after first day: (1) Kiyoshi Murota (JPN) 66 (−6) (2) Trevor Dodds (USA) 67 (−5) (3) Mark O'Meara (USA) 68 (−4)
      - 78 players will complete their first round on May 27.

==== Ice hockey ====
- Memorial Cup in Mississauga, Ontario:
  - Tiebreaker: **Kootenay Ice** 7, Owen Sound Attack 3

==== Tennis ====
- French Open in Paris, France, day 5:
  - Men's singles, second round:
    - **Rafael Nadal** (ESP) [1] def. Pablo Andújar (ESP) 7–5, 6–3, 7–6(4)
    - **Andy Murray** (GBR) [4] def. Simone Bolelli (ITA) 7–6(3), 6–4, 7–5
    - **Robin Söderling** (SWE) [5] def. Albert Ramos (ESP) 6–3, 6–4, 6–4
    - **Lukáš Rosol** (CZE) def. Jürgen Melzer (AUT) [8] 6–7(4), 6–4, 4–6, 7–6(3), 6–4
    - **Mardy Fish** (USA) [10] def. Robin Haase (NED) 7–6(1), 6–2, 6–1
  - Women's singles, second round:
    - **Arantxa Rus** (NED) def. Kim Clijsters (BEL) [2] 3–6, 7–5, 6–1
    - **Victoria Azarenka** (BLR) [4] def. Pauline Parmentier (FRA) 6–0, 6–1
    - **Li Na** (CHN) [6] def. Sílvia Soler Espinosa (ESP) 6–4, 7–5
    - **Maria Sharapova** (RUS) [7] def. Caroline Garcia (FRA) 3–6, 6–4, 6–0
    - **Petra Kvitová** (CZE) [9] def. Zheng Jie (CHN) 6–4, 6–1

==== Volleyball ====
- Men's European League, Leg 1:
  - Pool B: Austria 1–3 Greece

=== May 25, 2011 (Wednesday) ===
==== Badminton ====
- Sudirman Cup in Qingdao, China: (teams in **bold** advance to the quarterfinals)
  - Group B: **Indonesia** 3–2 **Malaysia**
    - Final standings: Indonesia 2–0, Malaysia 1–1, Russia 0–2.
  - Group D: **Denmark** 2–3 **South Korea**
    - Final standings: Korea 2–0, Denmark 1–1, England 0–2.

==== Basketball ====
- NBA playoffs:
  - Western Conference finals: (series best-of-7; seeds in parentheses)
    - Game 5 in Dallas: (3) Dallas Mavericks 100, (4) Oklahoma City Thunder 96. **Mavericks win series 4–1.**
      - The Mavericks advance to the NBA finals for the second time.

==== Cricket ====
- Indian Premier League playoff:
  - Eliminator in Mumbai: Kolkata Knight Riders 147/7 (20 overs); Mumbai Indians 148/6 (19.2 overs). **Mumbai Indians win by 4 wickets.**

==== Cycling ====
- Grand Tours:
  - Giro d'Italia, Stage 17: (gold) Diego Ulissi (ITA) (Lampre–ISD) 5h 31' 51" (silver) Pablo Lastras (ESP) (Movistar Team) s.t. (bronze) Giovanni Visconti (ITA) (Farnese Vini–Neri Sottoli) s.t.
    - General classification (after stage 17): (1) Alberto Contador (ESP) (Saxo Bank–SunGard) 68h 18' 27" (2) Michele Scarponi (ITA) (Lampre–ISD) + 4' 58" (3) Vincenzo Nibali (ITA) (Liquigas–Cannondale) + 5' 45"

==== Football (soccer) ====
- Nations Cup in Dublin, Republic of Ireland: Wales 1–3 Scotland
  - Standings (after 2 matches): Republic of Ireland, Scotland 6 points, Wales, Northern Ireland 0.
- Friendly international: (top 10 in FIFA World Rankings)
  - (5) Argentina 4–2 Paraguay
- Copa Libertadores semifinals, first leg: Santos (Brazil) 1–0 (Paraguay) Cerro Porteño
- AFC Champions League Round of 16:
  - **Al-Sadd** (Qatar) 1–0 (Saudi Arabia) Al-Shabab
  - **Zob Ahan** (Iran) 4–1 (Saudi Arabia) Al-Nassr
  - **FC Seoul** (South Korea) 3–0 (Japan) Kashima Antlers
  - **Suwon Samsung Bluewings** (South Korea) 2–0 (Japan) Nagoya Grampus
- AFC Cup Round of 16:
  - Al-Qadsia 2–2 (2–3 pen.) **Al-Kuwait**
  - **Al-Wehdat** (Jordan) 2–1 (Uzbekistan) Shurtan Guzar
  - Sông Lam Nghệ An (Vietnam) 1–3 (Indonesia) **Persipura Jayapura**
  - **Chonburi** (Thailand) 3–0 (Indonesia) Sriwijaya
- Austrian Bundesliga, final matchday (team in **bold** qualifies for the UEFA Champions League, teams in italics qualify for the UEFA Europa League):
  - Austria Wien 2–4 Red Bull Salzburg
  - **Sturm Graz** 2–1 FC Wacker Innsbruck
    - Final standings: Sturm Graz 66 points, Red Bull Salzburg 63, Austria Wien 61.
    - Sturm Graz win the title for the third time.
- (Serbia) Serbian SuperLiga, matchday 29 (team in **bold** qualifies for the UEFA Champions League, teams in italics qualify for the UEFA Europa League):
  - Metalac G.M. 1–1 **Partizan**
  - Smederevo 0–0 Vojvodina
  - Red Star Belgrade 2–2 Spartak Zlatibor Voda
    - Standings: Partizan 73 points, Red Star, Vojvodina 67.
    - Partizan win the title for the fourth successive time.
- (Switzerland) Swiss Super League, final matchday (teams in **bold** qualify for the UEFA Champions League, teams in italics qualify for the UEFA Europa League):
  - **Basel** 3–0 Luzern
  - **Zürich** 1–0 Thun
    - Final standings: Basel 73 points, Zürich 72, Young Boys 57, Sion 54.
    - Basel win the title for the second successive time, and 14th time overall.
- Bosnia and Herzegovina Cup final, second leg (first leg score in parentheses):
  - Čelik 0–3 (0–1) **Željezničar**. Željezničar win 4–0 on aggregate.
    - Željezničar win the Cup for a record fourth time.
- (Bulgaria) Bulgarian Cup final in Sofia: **CSKA Sofia** 1–0 Slavia Sofia
  - CSKA Sofia win the Cup for the 20th time.
- (Croatia) Croatian Cup final, second leg (first leg score in parentheses):
  - Varaždin 1–3 (1–5) **Dinamo Zagreb**. Dinamo Zagreb win 8–2 on aggregate.
    - Dinamo Zagreb win the Cup for the eleventh time.
- (Czech Republic) Czech Cup final in Jihlava: **Mladá Boleslav** 1–1 (4–3 pen.) Sigma Olomouc
  - Mladá Boleslav win the Cup for the first time.
- Israel State Cup final in Ramat Gan: **Hapoel Tel Aviv** 1–0 Maccabi Haifa
  - Hapoel Tel Aviv win the Cup for the 14th time.
- (Montenegro) Montenegrin Cup final in Podgorica: Mogren 2–2 (4–5 pen.) **Rudar Pljevlja**
  - Rudar win the Cup for the third time.
- (Romania) Cupa României Final in Brașov: **Steaua București** 2–1 Dinamo București
  - Steaua București win the Cup for the 21st time.
- (Slovenia) Slovenian Cup final in Ljubljana: **Domžale** 4–3 Maribor
  - Domžale win the Cup for the first time.
- (Ukraine) Ukrainian Cup final in Sumy: **Shakhtar Donetsk** 2–0 FC Dynamo Kyiv
  - Shakhtar Donetsk win the Cup for the seventh time.
- (Canada) Canadian Championship final, second leg (first leg score in parentheses):
  - Toronto FC 0–1 (1–1) Vancouver Whitecaps — match abandoned after 60 minutes due to a waterlogged pitch. The match is due to be replayed in its entirety on May 26.

==== Ice hockey ====
- Stanley Cup playoffs:
  - Eastern Conference finals: (series best-of-7; seeds in parentheses)
    - Game 6 in Tampa: (5) Tampa Bay Lightning 5, (3) Boston Bruins 4. Series tied 3–3.
- Memorial Cup in Mississauga, Ontario (team in **bold** advances to the final, teams in italics advance to the tiebreaker):
  - Round robin: Mississauga St. Michael's Majors 3, Owen Sound Attack 1
    - Final standings: **Saint John Sea Dogs**, Mississauga St. Michael's Majors 4 points, Owen Sound Attack, Kootenay Ice 2.

==== Rugby league ====
- State of Origin Series:
  - Game I in Brisbane: Queensland 16–12 New South Wales. **Queensland lead 3-match series 1–0.**

==== Tennis ====
- French Open in Paris, France, day 4:
  - Men's singles, second round:
    - **Novak Djokovic** (SRB) [2] def. Victor Hănescu (ROU) 6–4, 6–1, 2–3 retired
    - **Roger Federer** (SUI) [3] def. Maxime Teixeira (FRA) 6–3, 6–0, 6–2
    - **David Ferrer** (ESP) [7] def. Julien Benneteau (FRA) 6–3, 6–4, 6–2
    - **Gaël Monfils** (FRA) [9] def. Guillaume Rufin (FRA) 6–3, 1–6, 6–1, 6–3
  - Women's singles, second round:
    - **Caroline Wozniacki** (DEN) [1] def. Aleksandra Wozniak (CAN) 6–3, 7–6(6)
    - **Vera Zvonareva** (RUS) [3] def. Sabine Lisicki (GER) 4–6, 7–5, 7–5
    - **Francesca Schiavone** (ITA) [5] def. Vesna Dolonts (RUS) 6–1, 6–2
    - **Samantha Stosur** (AUS) [8] def. Simona Halep (ROU) 6–0, 6–2

=== May 24, 2011 (Tuesday) ===
==== Badminton ====
- Sudirman Cup in Qingdao, China: (teams in **bold** advance to the quarterfinals)
  - Group A: **China** 5–0 **Japan**
    - Final standings: China 2–0, Japan 1–1, Germany 0–2.
  - Group C: **Chinese Taipei** 3–2 Thailand
    - Final standings: Chinese Taipei 2–0, **India** 1–1, Thailand 0–2.

==== Basketball ====
- NBA playoffs:
  - Eastern Conference finals: (series best-of-7; seeds in parentheses)
    - Game 4 in Miami: (2) Miami Heat 101, (1) Chicago Bulls 93 (OT). Heat lead series 3–1.
- (Brazil) Novo Basquete Brasil finals: (series best-of-5)
  - Game 4: UniCEUB/BRB/Brasília 77–68 Franca. **Brasília win series 3–1**.
    - Brasília win the championship for the second straight time.

==== Cricket ====
- Pakistan in the West Indies:
  - 2nd Test in Basseterre, Saint Kitts; day 5: Pakistan 272 & 377/6d; West Indies 223 & 230 (80.3 overs). **Pakistan win by 196 runs; 2-match series drawn 1–1.**
- Indian Premier League playoff:
  - Qualifier 1 in Mumbai: Royal Challengers Bangalore 175/4 (20 overs); Chennai Super Kings 177/4 (19.4 overs). **Chennai Super Kings win by 6 wickets.**

==== Cycling ====
- Grand Tours:
  - Giro d'Italia, Stage 16: (gold) Alberto Contador (ESP) (Saxo Bank–SunGard) 28' 55" (silver) Vincenzo Nibali (ITA) (Liquigas–Cannondale) + 34" (bronze) Michele Scarponi (ITA) (Lampre–ISD) + 38"
    - General classification (after stage 16): (1) Contador 62h 43' 37" (2) Scarponi + 4' 58" (3) Nibali + 5' 45"

==== Football (soccer) ====
- Nations Cup in Dublin, Republic of Ireland: Republic of Ireland 5–0 Northern Ireland
  - Standings: Republic of Ireland 6 points (2 matches), Scotland 3 (1), Wales 0 (1), Northern Ireland 0 (2).
- AFC Champions League Round of 16:
  - **Sepahan** (Iran) 3–1 (Uzbekistan) Bunyodkor
  - **Al-Ittihad** (Saudi Arabia) 3–1 (Saudi Arabia) Al-Hilal
  - Gamba Osaka (Japan) 0–1 (Japan) **Cerezo Osaka**
  - **Jeonbuk Hyundai Motors** (South Korea) 3–0 (China) Tianjin Teda
- AFC Cup Round of 16:
  - **Nasaf Qarshi** (Uzbekistan) 2–1 (Jordan) Al-Faisaly
  - **Duhok** (Iraq) 1–0 (India) Dempo
  - **Arbil** (Iraq) 1–0 (a.e.t.) (Singapore) Tampines Rovers
  - **Muangthong United** (Thailand) 4–0 (Lebanon) Al Ahed
- Azerbaijan Cup final in Baku: Inter Baku 1–1 (2–4 pen.) **Khazar Lankaran**
  - Khazar win the Cup for the third time.
- (North Macedonia) Macedonian Cup final in Prilep: Teteks 0–2 **Metalurg**
  - Metalurg win the Cup for the first time.

==== Ice hockey ====
- Stanley Cup playoffs:
  - Western Conference finals: (series best-of-7; seeds in parentheses)
    - Game five in Vancouver: (1) Vancouver Canucks 3, (2) San Jose Sharks 2 (2OT). **Canucks win series 4–1.**
      - The Canucks advance to the Stanley Cup Final for the third time.
- Memorial Cup in Mississauga, Ontario (team in **bold** advances to the final, team in italics advances to the tiebreaker):
  - Round robin: Kootenay Ice 5, **Saint John Sea Dogs** 4 (OT)
    - Standings: Saint John Sea Dogs 4 points (3 games), Owen Sound Attack, Mississauga St. Michael's Majors 2 (2), Kootenay Ice 2 (3).

==== Rugby union ====
- IRB Junior World Trophy in Georgia:
  - Group A:
    - Samoa 48–11 United States
    - Russia 5–33 Uruguay
  - Group B:
    - Japan 37–24 Zimbabwe
    - Georgia 38–9 Canada

==== Tennis ====
- French Open in Paris, France, day 3:
  - Men's singles, first round:
    - **Rafael Nadal** (ESP) [1] def. John Isner (USA) 6–4, 6–7(2), 6–7(2), 6–2, 6–4
    - **Andy Murray** (GBR) [4] def. Éric Prodon (FRA) 6–4, 6–1, 6–3
    - **Robin Söderling** (SWE) [5] def. Ryan Harrison (USA) 6–1, 6–7(5), 6–3, 7–5
    - **Jürgen Melzer** (AUT) [8] def. Andreas Beck (GER) 6–3, 6–4, 6–2
  - Women's singles, first round:
    - **Kim Clijsters** (BEL) [2] def. Anastasiya Yakimova (BLR) 6–2, 6–3
    - **Victoria Azarenka** (BLR) [4] def. Andrea Hlaváčková (CZE) 6–3, 6–3
    - **Li Na** (CHN) [6] def. Barbora Záhlavová-Strýcová (CZE) 6–3, 6–7(6), 6–3
    - **Maria Sharapova** (RUS) [7] def. Mirjana Lučić (CRO) 6–3, 6–0

=== May 23, 2011 (Monday) ===
==== Badminton ====
- Sudirman Cup in Qingdao, China: (teams in **bold** advance to the quarterfinals)
  - Group A: **Japan** 4–1 Germany
    - Standings: **China**, Japan 1–0, Germany 0–2.
  - Group B: **Malaysia** 4–1 Russia
    - Standings: **Indonesia**, Malaysia 1–0, Russia 0–2.
  - Group C: Thailand 2–3 India
    - Standings: Chinese Taipei 1–0, India 1–1, Thailand 0–1.
  - Group D: **South Korea** 4–1 England
    - Standings: **Denmark**, Korea 1–0, England 0–2.

==== Basketball ====
- NBA playoffs:
  - Western Conference finals: (series best-of-7; seeds in parentheses)
    - Game 4 in Oklahoma City: (3) Dallas Mavericks 112, (4) Oklahoma City Thunder 105 (OT). Mavericks lead series 3–1.
- (Poland) Polish League finals, game 7: Asseco Prokom Gdynia 76–71 Turów Zgorzelec. **Asseco Prokom Gdynia win series 4–3.**
  - Asseco Prokom win the championship for the eighth successive time.

==== Cricket ====
- Pakistan in the West Indies:
  - 2nd Test in Basseterre, Saint Kitts; day 4: Pakistan 272 & 377/6d (112.2 overs; Taufeeq Umar 135, Misbah-ul-Haq 102*); West Indies 223 & 130/5 (53 overs). West Indies require another 297 runs with 5 wickets remaining.

==== Ice hockey ====
- Stanley Cup playoffs:
  - Eastern Conference finals: (series best-of-7; seeds in parentheses)
    - Game five in Boston: (3) Boston Bruins 3, (5) Tampa Bay Lightning 1. Bruins lead series 3–2.
- Memorial Cup in Mississauga, Ontario (team in **bold** advances to the final):
  - Round robin: **Saint John Sea Dogs** 3, Owen Sound Attack 2 (OT)
    - Standings (after 2 games): Saint John Sea Dogs 4 points, Owen Sound Attack, Mississauga St. Michael's Majors 2, Kootenay Ice 0.

==== Tennis ====
- French Open in Paris, France, day 2:
  - Men's singles, first round:
    - **Novak Djokovic** (SRB) [2] def. Thiemo de Bakker (NED) 6–2, 6–1, 6–3
    - **Roger Federer** (SUI) [3] def. Feliciano López (ESP) 6–3, 6–3, 7–6(3)
    - **Stéphane Robert** (FRA) def. Tomáš Berdych (CZE) [6] 3–6, 3–6, 6–2, 6–2, 9–7
    - **Gaël Monfils** (FRA) [9] def. Björn Phau (GER) 4–6, 6–3, 7–5, 6–0
    - **Mardy Fish** (USA) [10] def. Ricardo Mello (BRA) 6–2, 6–7(11), 6–2, 6–4
  - Women's singles, first round:
    - **Caroline Wozniacki** (DEN) [1] def. Kimiko Date-Krumm (JPN) 6–0, 6–2
    - **Vera Zvonareva** (RUS) [3] def. Lourdes Domínguez Lino (ESP) 6–3, 6–3
    - **Francesca Schiavone** (ITA) [5] def. Melanie Oudin (USA) 6–2, 6–0
    - **Petra Kvitová** (CZE) [9] def. Gréta Arn (HUN) 6–2, 6–1

=== May 22, 2011 (Sunday) ===
==== Auto racing ====
- Formula One:
  - Spanish Grand Prix in Montmeló, Spain: (1) Sebastian Vettel (GER) (Red Bull–Renault) (2) Lewis Hamilton (GBR) (McLaren–Mercedes) (3) Jenson Button (GBR) (McLaren-Mercedes)
    - Drivers' championship standings (after 5 of 19 races): (1) Vettel 118 points (2) Hamilton 77 (3) Mark Webber (AUS) (Red Bull-Renault) 67
- Nationwide Series:
  - Iowa John Deere Dealers 250 in Newton, Iowa: (1) (Mississippi) Ricky Stenhouse Jr. (Ford; Roush Fenway Racing) (2) (Missouri) Carl Edwards (Ford; Roush Fenway Racing) (3) (Michigan) Brad Keselowski (Dodge; Penske Racing)
    - Drivers' championship standings (after 12 of 34 races): (1) (Virginia) Elliott Sadler (Chevrolet; Kevin Harvick Incorporated) 418 points (2) (Georgia (U.S. state)) Reed Sorenson (Chevrolet; Turner Motorsports) 411 (3) Stenhouse Jr. 410
- V8 Supercars:
  - Winton 300 in Benalla, Victoria:
    - Race 11: (1) Jason Bright (AUS) (Brad Jones Racing, Holden VE Commodore) (2) Jamie Whincup (AUS) (Triple Eight Race Engineering, Holden VE Commodore) (3) Garth Tander (AUS) (Holden Racing Team, Holden VE Commodore)
      - Drivers' championship standings (after 11 of 27 races): (1) Whincup 1234 points (2) Craig Lowndes (AUS) (Triple Eight Race Engineering, Holden VE Commodore) 972 (3) Tander 935

==== Badminton ====
- Sudirman Cup in Qingdao, China:
  - Group A: China 4–1 Germany
  - Group B: Indonesia 4–1 Russia
  - Group C: Chinese Taipei 3–2 India
  - Group D: Denmark 5–0 England

==== Basketball ====
- NBA playoffs:
  - Eastern Conference finals: (series best-of-7; seeds in parentheses)
    - Game 3 in Miami: (2) Miami Heat 96, (1) Chicago Bulls 85. Heat lead series 2–1.

==== Cricket ====
- Pakistan in the West Indies:
  - 2nd Test in Basseterre, Saint Kitts; day 3: Pakistan 272 & 202/3 (75 overs); West Indies 223 (83.5 overs). Pakistan lead by 251 runs with 7 wickets remaining.

==== Cycling ====
- Grand Tours:
  - Giro d'Italia, Stage 15: (gold) Mikel Nieve (ESP) (Euskaltel–Euskadi) 7h 27' 14" (silver) Stefano Garzelli (ITA) (Acqua & Sapone) + 1' 41" (bronze) Alberto Contador (ESP) (Saxo Bank–SunGard) + 1' 51"
    - General classification (after stage 15): (1) Contador 62h 14' 42" (2) Michele Scarponi (ITA) (Lampre–ISD) + 4' 20" (3) Vincenzo Nibali (ITA) (Liquigas–Cannondale) + 5' 11"
- UCI America Tour:
  - Tour of California, Stage 8: (gold) Matthew Goss (AUS) (HTC–Highroad) 2h 56' 39" (silver) Peter Sagan (SVK) (Liquigas–Cannondale) s.t. (bronze) Greg Henderson (NZL) (Team Sky) s.t.
    - Final general classification: (1) Chris Horner (USA) (Team RadioShack) 23h 46' 41" (2) Levi Leipheimer (USA) (Team RadioShack) + 38" (3) Tom Danielson (USA) (Garmin–Cervélo) + 2' 45"

==== Football (soccer) ====
- (Mexico) Primera División de México Clausura Liguilla Final, second leg (first leg score in parentheses):
  - **UNAM** 2–1 (1–1) Monarcas Morelia. UNAM win 3–2 on aggregate.
    - UNAM win the title for the seventh time.
- (Bosnia and Herzegovina) Premier League, matchday 29 (team in **bold** qualifies for the UEFA Champions League, teams in italics qualify for the UEFA Europa League):
  - Željezničar 0–1 **Borac Banja Luka**
    - Standings: Borac Banja Luka 63 points, Željezničar 55, Sarajevo 54.
    - Borac win the title for the first time.
- (Georgia (country)) Umaglesi Liga, final matchday (team in **bold** qualifies for the UEFA Champions League, teams in italics qualify for the UEFA Europa League):
  - **Zestafoni** 4–0 WIT Georgia
  - Dinamo Tbilisi 1–2 Torpedo 2008 Kutaisi
    - Standings: Zestafoni 78 points, Dinamo Tbilisi 72, Olimpi Rustavi 66.
    - Zestafoni win the title for the first time.
- (Turkey) Süper Lig, final matchday (teams in **bold** qualify for the UEFA Champions League, team in italics qualifies for the UEFA Europa League):
  - Sivasspor 3–4 **Fenerbahçe**
  - Kardemir Karabükspor 0–4 **Trabzonspor**
    - Standings: Fenerbahçe 82 points (+50 goal difference), Trabzonspor 82 (+46), Bursaspor 61.
    - Fenerbahçe win the title for a record 18th time.
- Taça de Portugal Final in Oeiras: **Porto** 6–2 Vitória de Guimarães
  - Porto win the Cup for the third successive time, and 16th time overall. Porto also complete a treble, with wins in the Primeira Liga and Europa League.
- (Russia) Russian Cup final in Yaroslavl: **CSKA Moscow** 2–1 Alania Vladikavkaz
  - CSKA Moscow win the Cup for a record sixth time.
- (Denmark) Danish Cup final in Copenhagen: **FC Nordsjælland** 3–2 FC Midtjylland
  - Nordsjælland win the Cup for the second successive time.
- (Albania) Albanian Cup final in Tirana: **KF Tirana** 1–1 (4–3 pen.) Dinamo Tirana
  - KF Tirana win the Cup for the 14th time.
- (Malta) Maltese Cup final in Ta' Qali: Valletta 0–1 **Floriana**
  - Floriana win the Cup for the 19th time.

==== Golf ====
- PGA Tour:
  - Crowne Plaza Invitational at Colonial in Fort Worth, Texas:
    - Winner: David Toms (USA) 265 (−15)
      - Toms wins his 13th PGA Tour title, and first since 2006.
- European Tour:
  - Volvo World Match Play Championship in Casares, Málaga, Spain:
    - Final: **Ian Poulter** (ENG) def. Luke Donald (ENG) 2 & 1
      - Poulter wins his 11th European Tour title, and denies Donald the number 1 spot in the official world rankings.
  - Madeira Islands Open in Porto Santo, Madeira, Portugal:
    - Winner: Michael Hoey (NIR) 278 (−10)
      - Hoey wins his second European Tour title.
- LPGA Tour:
  - Sybase Match Play Championship in Gladstone, New Jersey:
    - Final: **Suzann Pettersen** (NOR) def. Cristie Kerr (USA) 1 up
      - Pettersen wins her seventh LPGA Tour title.

==== Ice hockey ====
- Stanley Cup playoffs:
  - Western Conference finals: (series best-of-7; seeds in parentheses)
    - Game four in San Jose: (1) Vancouver Canucks 4, (2) San Jose Sharks 2. Canucks lead series 3–1.
- Memorial Cup in Mississauga, Ontario:
  - Round robin: Mississauga St. Michael's Majors 2, Kootenay Ice 1
    - Standings: Owen Sound Attack, Saint John Sea Dogs 2 points (1 game), Mississauga St. Michael's Majors 2 (2), Kootenay Ice 0 (2).

==== Rugby union ====
- IRB Sevens World Series:
  - London Sevens at Twickenham:
    - Shield: Portugal 7–22 **England**
    - Bowl: **Scotland** 21–19 Kenya
    - Plate: **Samoa** 22–12 Australia
    - Cup: Fiji 14–24 **South Africa**
      - Standings (after 7 of 8 competitions): (1) New Zealand 150 points (2) England 121 (3) South Africa 116
      - New Zealand clinch their ninth series title in 12 seasons of the Sevens World Series.
- (France) Pro D2 promotion final in Agen: Albi 14–21 **Bordeaux**
  - Bordeaux earns promotion to the Top 14 for the first time since the club's creation in a 2006 merger, joining season champion Lyon.

==== Tennis ====
- French Open in Paris, France, day 1:
  - Men's singles, first round:
    - **David Ferrer** (ESP) [7] def. Jarkko Nieminen (FIN) 6–3, 6–3, 6–1
  - Women's singles, first round:
    - **Samantha Stosur** (AUS) [8] def. Iveta Benešová (CZE) 6–2, 6–3
    - **Jelena Janković** (SRB) [10] def. Alona Bondarenko (UKR) 6–3, 6–1

=== May 21, 2011 (Saturday) ===
==== Athletics ====
- Betty Heidler (GER) breaks the world record for the women's hammer throw, registering a distance of 79.42 metres in Halle, Germany. She improves the previous record of Anita Włodarczyk (POL) by 1.12 metres.

==== Auto racing ====
- Sprint Cup Series:
  - NASCAR Sprint All-Star Race in Concord, North Carolina: (1) (Missouri) Carl Edwards (Ford; Roush Fenway Racing) (2) (Nevada) Kyle Busch (Toyota; Joe Gibbs Racing) (3) (Florida) David Reutimann (Toyota; Michael Waltrip Racing)
- V8 Supercars:
  - Winton 300 in Benalla, Victoria:
    - Race 10: (1) Jamie Whincup (AUS) (Triple Eight Race Engineering, Holden VE Commodore) (2) Lee Holdsworth (AUS) (Garry Rogers Motorsport, Holden VE Commodore) (3) Steven Johnson (AUS) (Dick Johnson Racing, Ford FG Falcon)
      - Drivers' championship standings (after 10 of 27 races): (1) Whincup 1096 points (2) Craig Lowndes (AUS) (Triple Eight Race Engineering, Holden VE Commodore) 876 (3) Rick Kelly (AUS) (Kelly Racing, Holden VE Commodore) 833
- IndyCar Series:
  - 95th Indianapolis 500 – Qualification in Speedway, Indiana:
    - Front row: (1) Alex Tagliani (CAN) (Sam Schmidt Motorsports) 227.472 mph (2) Scott Dixon (NZL) (Chip Ganassi Racing) 227.340 mph (3) Oriol Servià (ESP) (Newman/Haas Racing) 227.168 mph
      - Tagliani becomes the first Canadian driver to take pole position for the race.

==== Basketball ====
- NBA playoffs:
  - Western Conference finals: (series best-of-7; seeds in parentheses)
    - Game 3 in Oklahoma City: (3) Dallas Mavericks 93, (4) Oklahoma City Thunder 87. Mavericks lead series 2–1.

==== Cricket ====
- Pakistan in the West Indies:
  - 2nd Test in Basseterre, Saint Kitts; day 2: Pakistan 272 (109.5 overs); West Indies 184/8 (63 overs). West Indies trail by 88 runs with 2 wickets remaining in the 1st innings.

==== Cycling ====
- Grand Tours:
  - Giro d'Italia, Stage 14: (gold) Igor Antón (ESP) (Euskaltel–Euskadi) 5h 04' 26" (silver) Alberto Contador (ESP) (Saxo Bank–SunGard) + 33" (bronze) Vincenzo Nibali (ITA) (Liquigas–Cannondale) + 40"
    - General classification (after stage 14): (1) Contador 54h 45' 45" (2) Nibali + 3' 20" (3) Antón + 3' 21"
- UCI America Tour:
  - Tour of California, Stage 7: (gold) Levi Leipheimer (USA) (Team RadioShack) 3h 33' 01" (silver) Chris Horner (USA) (Team RadioShack) s.t. (bronze) Laurens ten Dam (NED) (Rabobank) + 43"
    - General classification (after stage 7): (1) Horner 20h 50' 02" (2) Leipheimer + 38" (3) Tom Danielson (USA) (Garmin–Cervélo) + 2' 45"

==== Football (soccer) ====
- Friendly women's international (top 10 in FIFA Women's World Rankings):
  - (2) Germany 2–0 (8) North Korea
- (France) Ligue 1, matchday 37 (teams in **bold** qualify for the UEFA Champions League):
  - **Marseille** 2–2 Valenciennes
  - Paris Saint-Germain 2–2 **Lille**
    - Standings: Lille 73 points, Marseille 67, Lyon 61.
    - Lille win the title for the first time since 1953–54, and third time overall.
- (Bulgaria) A PFG, matchday 29 (team in **bold** qualifies for the UEFA Champions League, teams in italics qualify for the UEFA Europa League):
  - Akademik Sofia 0–3 Levski Sofia
  - Lokomotiv Sofia 1–3 **Litex Lovech**
    - Standings: Litex Lovech 74 points, Levski Sofia 69, CSKA Sofia 58.
    - Litex win their second successive title, and fourth overall.
- (Czech Republic) Gambrinus liga, matchday 29 (team in **bold** qualifies for the UEFA Champions League, teams in italics qualify for the UEFA Europa League):
  - **Viktoria Plzeň** 3–1 Baník Ostrava
  - Ústí nad Labem 1–3 Sparta Prague
    - Standings: Viktoria Plzeň 69 points, Sparta Prague 65, Jablonec 55.
    - Viktoria Plzeň win the title for the first time.
- (Slovenia) PrvaLiga, matchday 35 (team in **bold** qualifies for the UEFA Champions League, teams in italics qualify for the UEFA Europa League):
  - Domžale 3–0 Olimpija
  - Primorje 1–2 **Maribor**
    - Standings: Maribor 72 points, Domžale 67, Koper 60.
    - Maribor win the title for the ninth time.
- (Slovakia) Superliga, matchday 32 (team in **bold** qualifies for the UEFA Champions League, teams in italics qualify for the UEFA Europa League):
  - **Slovan Bratislava** 3–1 Dubnica
  - Ružomberok 3–2 Senica
    - Standings: Slovan Bratislava 65 points, Senica 58, Žilina 54.
    - Slovan Bratislava win the title for a record sixth time.
- (Germany) DFB-Pokal final in Berlin: Duisburg 0–5 **Schalke 04**
  - Schalke win the Cup for the fifth time.
- (Scotland) Scottish Cup final in Glasgow: Motherwell 0–3 **Celtic**
  - Celtic win the Cup for the 35th time.
- (Belgium) Belgian Cup final in Brussels: Westerlo 0–2 **Standard Liège**
  - Standard Liège win the Cup for the first time since 1993, and sixth time overall.

==== Horse racing ====
- U.S. Thoroughbred Triple Crown:
  - Preakness Stakes in Baltimore: (gold) Shackleford (trainer: Dale L. Romans; jockey: Jesús Castañón) (silver) Animal Kingdom (trainer: H. Graham Motion; jockey: John R. Velazquez) (bronze) Astrology (trainer: Steve Asmussen; jockey: Mike E. Smith)
    - Shackleford's victory in the second race of the Triple Crown over Kentucky Derby winner Animal Kingdom extends U.S. Thoroughbred racing's longest losing streak to 33 years since Steve Cauthen's Affirmed last won the Triple Crown championship.

==== Ice hockey ====
- Stanley Cup playoffs:
  - Eastern Conference finals: (series best-of-7; seeds in parentheses)
    - Game four in Tampa: (5) Tampa Bay Lightning 5, (3) Boston Bruins 3. Series tied 2–2.
- Memorial Cup in Mississauga, Ontario:
  - Round robin: Owen Sound Attack 5, Kootenay Ice 0.

==== Rugby union ====
- Heineken Cup final in Cardiff: Northampton Saints (England) 22–33 (Ireland) **Leinster**
  - Leinster win the Cup for the second time in three seasons.

==== Tennis ====
- ATP World Tour:
  - Power Horse World Team Cup in Düsseldorf, Germany:
    - Final: **Germany** 2–1 Argentina
      - Florian Mayer (GER) def. Juan Mónaco (ARG) 7–6(4), 6–0
      - Juan Ignacio Chela (ARG) def. Philipp Kohlschreiber (GER) 6–4, 7–6(4)
      - Kohlschreiber/Philipp Petzschner (GER) def. Chela/Máximo González (ARG) 6–3, 7–6(5)
        - Germany win the Cup for a record fifth time.
  - Open de Nice Côte d'Azur in Nice, France:
    - Final: **Nicolás Almagro** (ESP) def. Victor Hănescu (ROU) 6–7(5), 6–3, 6–3
      - Almagro wins his third title of the year and tenth of his career.
- WTA Tour:
  - Brussels Open in Brussels, Belgium:
    - Final: **Caroline Wozniacki** (DEN) def. Peng Shuai (CHN) 2–6, 6–3, 6–3
      - Wozniacki wins her fourth title of the year and 16th of her career.
  - Internationaux de Strasbourg in Strasbourg, France:
    - Final: **Andrea Petkovic** (GER) def. Marion Bartoli (FRA) 6–4, 1–0 retired
      - Petkovic wins her second career title.

=== May 20, 2011 (Friday) ===
==== Cricket ====
- Pakistan in the West Indies:
  - 2nd Test in Basseterre, Saint Kitts; day 1: Pakistan 180/6 (73.2 overs); West Indies.

==== Cycling ====
- Grand Tours:
  - Giro d'Italia, Stage 13: (gold) José Rujano (VEN) (Androni Giocattoli) 4h 45' 54" (silver) Alberto Contador (ESP) (Saxo Bank–SunGard) s.t. (bronze) John Gadret (FRA) (Ag2r–La Mondiale) + 1' 27"
    - General classification (after stage 13): (1) Contador 49h 40' 58" (2) Vincenzo Nibali (ITA) (Liquigas–Cannondale) + 3' 09" (3) Michele Scarponi (ITA) (Lampre–ISD) + 3' 16"
- UCI America Tour:
  - Tour of California, Stage 6: (gold) David Zabriskie (USA) (Garmin–Cervélo) 30' 35" (silver) Levi Leipheimer (USA) (Team RadioShack + 14" (bronze) Tejay van Garderen (USA) (HTC–Highroad) + 40"
    - General classification (after stage 6): (1) Chris Horner (USA) (Team RadioShack) 17h 17' 01" (2) Leipheimer + 38" (3) Rory Sutherland (AUS) (UnitedHealthcare) + 1' 38"

==== Equestrianism ====
- FEI Nations Cup Show Jumping – Promotional League, Europe:
  - FEI Nations Cup of Denmark in Copenhagen (CSIO 4*): (gold) Ireland (David O'Brien, Jennifer Crooks, Alexander Butler, Dermott Lennon) (silver) Germany (Holger Wulschner, Thomas Voss, Janne Friederike Meyer, Jörg Naeve) (bronze) Netherlands (Angelique Hoorn, Suzanne Tepper, Nathalie van der Mei, Jur Vrieling) & Belgium (Guido Hornesch, Donaat Brondeel, Delphine Goemaere, Gregory Wathelet)
    - Standings (after 3 of 7 competitions): (1) Italy & Spain 18.5 points (3) Sweden 17.5

==== Ice hockey ====
- Stanley Cup playoffs:
  - Western Conference finals: (series best-of-7; seeds in parentheses)
    - Game three in San Jose: (2) San Jose Sharks 4, (1) Vancouver Canucks 3. Canucks lead series 2–1.
- Memorial Cup in Mississauga, Ontario:
  - Round robin: Saint John Sea Dogs 4, Mississauga St. Michael's Majors 3.

==== Rugby union ====
- Amlin Challenge Cup final in Cardiff: **Harlequins** (England) 19–18 (France) Stade Français
  - Harlequins win the Cup for a record third time.

==== Surfing ====
- Men's World Tour:
  - Billabong Rio Pro at Rio de Janeiro, Brazil: (1) Adriano De Souza (BRA) (2) Taj Burrow (AUS) (3) Jérémy Florès (FRA) & Bede Durbidge (AUS)
    - Standings (after 3 of 11 events): (1) De Souza 20,500 points (2) Joel Parkinson (AUS) 19,200 (3) Kelly Slater (USA) 16,950

=== May 19, 2011 (Thursday) ===
==== Basketball ====
- NBA playoffs:
  - Western Conference finals (series best-of-7; seeds in parentheses):
    - Game 2 in Dallas: (4) Oklahoma City Thunder 106, (3) Dallas Mavericks 100. Series tied 1–1.

==== Cycling ====
- Grand Tours:
  - Giro d'Italia, Stage 12: (gold) Mark Cavendish (GBR) (HTC–Highroad) 4h 17' 25" (silver) Davide Appollonio (ITA) (Team Sky) s.t. (bronze) Alessandro Petacchi (ITA) (Lampre–ISD) s.t.
    - General classification (after stage 12): (1) Alberto Contador (ESP) (Saxo Bank–SunGard) 44h 55' 16" (2) Kanstantsin Sivtsov (BLR) (HTC–Highroad) + 59" (3) Vincenzo Nibali (ITA) (Liquigas–Cannondale) + 1' 21"
- UCI America Tour:
  - Tour of California, Stage 5: (gold) Peter Sagan (SVK) (Liquigas–Cannondale) 5h 16' 03" (silver) Leigh Howard (AUS) (HTC–Highroad) s.t. (bronze) Ben Swift (GBR) (Team Sky) s.t.
    - General classification (after stage 5): (1) Chris Horner (USA) (Team RadioShack) 16h 45' 35" (2) Levi Leipheimer (USA) (Team RadioShack) + 1' 15" (3) Tom Danielson (USA) (Garmin–Cervélo) + 1' 22"

==== Darts ====
- Premier League Play-offs in London, England:
  - Semifinals:
    - Phil Taylor (ENG) 3–8 **Adrian Lewis** (ENG)
    - Raymond van Barneveld (NED) 6–8 **Gary Anderson** (SCO)
  - Third place play-off: **Taylor** 8–6 van Barneveld
  - Final: Lewis 4–10 **Anderson**
    - Anderson becomes the first non-English player to win the title.

==== Football (soccer) ====
- Copa Libertadores quarterfinals, second leg (first leg score in parentheses):
  - Universidad Católica (Chile) 2–1 (0–2) (Uruguay) **Peñarol**. 3–3 on points; Peñarol win 3–2 on aggregate.
  - **Cerro Porteño** (Paraguay) 1–0 (1–1) (Mexico) Chiapas. Cerro Porteño win 4–1 on points.
- (Mexico) Primera División de México Clausura Liguilla Final, first leg: Monarcas Morelia 1–1 UNAM

==== Ice hockey ====
- Stanley Cup playoffs:
  - Eastern Conference finals: (series best-of-7; seeds in parentheses)
    - Game three in Tampa: (3) Boston Bruins 2, (5) Tampa Bay Lightning 0. Bruins lead series 2–1.

=== May 18, 2011 (Wednesday) ===
==== Basketball ====
- NBA playoffs:
  - Eastern Conference finals (series best-of-7; seeds in parentheses):
    - Game 2 in Chicago: (2) Miami Heat 85, (1) Chicago Bulls 75. Series tied 1–1.

==== Cycling ====
- Grand Tours:
  - Giro d'Italia, Stage 11: (gold) John Gadret (FRA) (Ag2r–La Mondiale) 3h 33' 11" (silver) Joaquim Rodríguez (ESP) (Team Katusha) s.t. (bronze) Giovanni Visconti (ITA) (Farnese Vini–Neri Sottoli) s.t.
    - General classification (after stage 11): (1) Alberto Contador (ESP) (Saxo Bank–SunGard) 40h 37' 51" (2) Kanstantsin Sivtsov (BLR) (HTC–Highroad) + 59" (3) Vincenzo Nibali (ITA) (Liquigas–Cannondale) + 1' 21"
- UCI America Tour:
  - Tour of California, Stage 4: (gold) Chris Horner (USA) (Team RadioShack) 3h 27' 51" (silver) Andy Schleck (LUX) (Leopard Trek) + 1' 15" (bronze) Rory Sutherland (AUS) (UnitedHealthcare) + 1' 15"
    - General classification (after stage 4): (1) Horner 11h 29' 32" (2) Levi Leipheimer (USA) (Team RadioShack) + 1' 15" (3) Tom Danielson (USA) (Garmin–Cervélo) + 1' 22"

==== Football (soccer) ====
- Friendly women's internationals (top 10 in FIFA Women's World Rankings):
  - (1) United States 2–0 (4) Japan
  - (6) Canada 2–1 Switzerland
- UEFA Europa League Final in Dublin: **Porto** (Portugal) 1–0 (Portugal) Braga
  - Porto win the tournament for the second time.
  - At the age of 33 years, 213 days, André Villas-Boas becomes the youngest manager to win a major European club competition.
- Copa Libertadores quarterfinals, second leg (first leg score in parentheses):
  - **Santos** (Brazil) 1–1 (1–0) (Colombia) Once Caldas. Santos win 4–1 on points.
  - Libertad (Paraguay) 2–4 (0–3) (Argentina) **Vélez Sarsfield**. Vélez Sársfield win 6–0 on points.
- (Canada) Canadian Championship finals, first leg: Vancouver Whitecaps 1–1 Toronto FC
- (Cyprus) Cypriot Cup final in Larnaca: Apollon 1–1 (3–4 pen.) **Omonia**
  - Omonia win the Cup for the 13th time.

==== Ice hockey ====
- Stanley Cup playoffs:
  - Western Conference finals: (series best-of-7; seeds in parentheses)
    - Game two in Vancouver: (1) Vancouver Canucks 7, (2) San Jose Sharks 3. Canucks lead series 2–0.

=== May 17, 2011 (Tuesday) ===
==== Basketball ====
- NBA playoffs:
  - Western Conference finals: (series best-of-7; seeds in parentheses)
    - Game 1 in Dallas: (3) Dallas Mavericks 121, (4) Oklahoma City Thunder 112. Mavericks lead series 1–0.
- NBA draft lottery:
  - The Cleveland Cavaliers, with the second-worst record in the league this season, win the first pick in the upcoming NBA draft when the pick they received from the Los Angeles Clippers in a trade for Baron Davis is chosen. The Minnesota Timberwolves, with the worst record, are drawn to pick second.

==== Cycling ====
- Grand Tours:
  - Giro d'Italia, Stage 10: (gold) Mark Cavendish (GBR) (HTC–Highroad) 4h 00' 49" (silver) Francisco Ventoso (ESP) (Movistar Team) s.t. (bronze) Alessandro Petacchi (ITA) (Lampre–ISD) s.t.
    - General classification (after stage 10): (1) Alberto Contador (ESP) (Saxo Bank–SunGard) 37h 04' 40" (2) Kanstantsin Sivtsov (BLR) (HTC–Highroad) + 59" (3) Christophe Le Mével (FRA) (Garmin–Cervélo) + 1' 19"
- UCI America Tour:
  - Tour of California, Stage 3: (gold) Greg Henderson (NZL) (Team Sky) 5h 14' 29" (silver) Juan José Haedo (ARG) (Saxo Bank–SunGard) s.t. (bronze) Thor Hushovd (NOR) (Garmin–Cervélo) s.t.
    - General classification (after stage 3): (1) Henderson 8h 01' 31" (2) Ben Swift (GBR) (Team Sky) + 0" (3) Peter Sagan (SVK) (Liquigas–Cannondale) + 4"

==== Football (soccer) ====
- (Belgium) Belgian Pro League, final matchday: (teams in **bold** qualify for the UEFA Champions League, teams in italics qualify for UEFA Europa League)
  - **Genk** 1–1 **Standard Liège**
    - Final standings: Genk, Standard Liège 51 points, Anderlecht 44, Club Brugge 43.
    - Genk win the title for the third time.
- (North Macedonia) First Macedonian Football League, matchday 31: (team in **bold** qualifies for the UEFA Champions League, team in italics qualifies for UEFA Europa League)
  - **Škendija** 2–1 Rabotnički
  - Metalurg Skopje 0–0 Renova
    - Standings: Škendija 70 points, Metalurg Skopje 59, Renova 56.
    - Škendija win the title for the first time.
- (Hungary) Hungarian Cup final in Budapest: **Kecskemét** 3–2 Videoton
  - Kecskemét win the Cup for the first time.

==== Ice hockey ====
- Stanley Cup playoffs:
  - Eastern Conference finals: (series best-of-7; seeds in parentheses)
    - Game two in Boston: (3) Boston Bruins 6, (5) Tampa Bay Lightning 5. Series tied 1–1.

=== May 16, 2011 (Monday) ===
==== Cycling ====
- UCI America Tour:
  - Tour of California, Stage 2: (gold) Ben Swift (GBR) (Team Sky) 2h 47' 12" (silver) Peter Sagan (SVK) (Liquigas–Cannondale) s.t. (bronze) Matthew Goss (AUS) (HTC–Highroad) s.t.
    - General classification (after stage 2): (1) Swift 2h 47' 02" (2) Sagan + 4" (3) Goss + 6"

==== Football (soccer) ====
- (Israel) Israeli Premier League, matchday 34: (team in **bold** qualifies for the UEFA Champions League, teams in italics qualify for UEFA Europa League)
  - **Maccabi Haifa** 2–0 Hapoel Ironi Kiryat Shmona
    - Standings: Maccabi Haifa 44 points, Hapoel Tel Aviv 38, Maccabi Tel Aviv 32.
    - Maccabi Haifa win the title for the 12th time.

=== May 15, 2011 (Sunday) ===
==== Athletics ====
- IAAF Diamond League:
  - Shanghai Golden Grand Prix in Shanghai, China:
    - Men:
      - 100m: Asafa Powell (JAM) 9.95
      - 110m hurdles: Liu Xiang (CHN) 13.07
      - 400m: Calvin Smith Jr. (USA) 45.47
      - 1500m: Nixon Chepseba (KEN) 3:31.42
      - 3000m steeplechase: Brimin Kipruto (KEN) 8:02.28
      - Javelin throw: Tero Pitkämäki (FIN) 85.33m
      - Long jump: Mitchell Watt (AUS) 8.44m
    - Women:
      - 100m: Veronica Campbell Brown (JAM) 10.92
      - 400m hurdles: Kaliese Spencer (JAM) 54.20
      - 800m: Jenny Meadows (GBR) 2:00.54
      - 5000m: Vivian Cheruiyot (KEN) 14:31.92
      - Discus throw: Sandra Perković (CRO) 65.58m
      - High jump: Blanka Vlašić (CRO) 1.94m
      - Pole vault: Silke Spiegelburg (GER) 4.55m
      - Shot put: Gong Lijiao (CHN) 19.94m
      - Triple jump: Yargelis Savigne (CUB) 14.68m

==== Auto racing ====
- Sprint Cup Series:
  - FedEx 400 benefiting Autism Speaks in Dover, Delaware: (1) (Wisconsin) Matt Kenseth (Ford; Roush Fenway Racing) (2) (Arkansas) Mark Martin (Chevrolet; Hendrick Motorsports) (3) (Australia) Marcos Ambrose (Ford; Richard Petty Motorsports)
    - Drivers' championship standings (after 11 of 36 races): (1) (Missouri) Carl Edwards (Ford; Roush Fenway Racing) 416 points (2) (California) Jimmie Johnson (Chevrolet; Hendrick Motorsports) 392 (3) (Nevada) Kyle Busch (Toyota; Joe Gibbs Racing) 379
- World Touring Car Championship:
  - Race of Italy in Monza:
    - Race 1: (1) Rob Huff (GBR) (Chevrolet; Chevrolet Cruze (2) Yvan Muller (FRA) (Chevrolet; Chevrolet Cruze) (3) Tiago Monteiro (POR) (Sunred Engineering; SEAT León)
    - Race 2: (1) Huff (2) Muller (3) Kristian Poulsen (DEN) (Liqui Moly Team Engstler; BMW 320 TC)
      - Drivers' championship standings (after 3 of 12 rounds): (1) Huff 120 points (2) Muller 84 (3) Alain Menu (SUI) (Chevrolet; Chevrolet Cruze) 79

==== Basketball ====
- NBA playoffs (series best-of-7; seeds in parentheses):
  - Western Conference semifinals:
    - Game 7 in Oklahoma City: (4) Oklahoma City Thunder 105, (8) Memphis Grizzlies 90. **Thunder win series 4–3.**
  - Eastern Conference finals:
    - Game 1 in Chicago: (1) Chicago Bulls 103, (2) Miami Heat 82. Bulls lead series 1–0.
- (Greece) Greek Cup final in Ellinikon: Panathinaikos 68–74 **Olympiacos**
  - Olympiacos win the Cup for the second successive time and ninth time overall. They also extend their unbeaten record in domestic play this season to 32–0.
- (France) French Cup final: **Chalon-sur-Saône** 79–71 Limoges

==== Cricket ====
- Pakistan in the West Indies:
  - 1st Test in Providence, Guyana; day 4: West Indies 226 & 152; Pakistan 160 & 178 (73 overs). **West Indies win by 40 runs, lead the 2-match series 1–0**.

==== Cycling ====
- Grand Tours:
  - Giro d'Italia, Stage 9: (gold) Alberto Contador (ESP) (Saxo Bank–SunGard) 4h 54' 09" (silver) José Rujano (VEN) (Androni Giocattoli) + 3" (bronze) Stefano Garzelli (ITA) (Acqua & Sapone) + 50"
    - General classification (after stage 9): (1) Contador 33h 03' 51" (2) Kanstantsin Sivtsov (BLR) (HTC–Highroad) + 59" (3) Christophe Le Mével (FRA) (Garmin–Cervélo) + 1' 19"
- UCI America Tour:
  - Tour of California, Stage 1: Cancelled due to poor weather conditions.

==== Equestrianism ====
- Show Jumping – Jumping International de France in La Baule-Escoublac (CSIO 5*):
  - Grand Prix: (gold) Eric Lamaze (CAN) on Hickstead (silver) Pénélope Leprevost (FRA) on Mylord Carthago (bronze) Carsten-Otto Nagel (GER) on Corradina

==== Field hockey ====
- Women's Champions Challenge II in Vienna, Austria:
  - Seventh and eighth place: **Canada** 2–1 Austria
  - Fifth and sixth place: **Russia** 2–1 Malaysia
  - Third and fourth place: Chile 2–2 (1–3 pen.) (bronze) **Belarus**
  - Final: (gold) **Belgium** 2–1 (silver) Italy
    - Belgium win the title for the first time and qualify for the Hockey Champions Challenge.

==== Football (soccer) ====
- European Under-17 Championship in Serbia:
  - Final: Germany 2–5 **Netherlands**
    - The Netherlands win the title for the first time.
- Friendly women's internationals (top 10 in FIFA Women's World Rankings):
  - (6) Canada 1–1 Switzerland
- (Scotland) Scottish Premier League, final matchday: (team in **bold** qualifies for the UEFA Champions League, teams in italics qualify for UEFA Europa League)
  - Kilmarnock 1–5 **Rangers**
  - Celtic 4–0 Motherwell
    - Final standings: Rangers 93 points, Celtic 92, Hearts 63.
    - Rangers win the title for the third successive time and 54th time overall.
- (Netherlands) Eredivisie, final matchday: (teams in **bold** qualify for the UEFA Champions League, teams in italics qualify for UEFA Europa League)
  - **Ajax** 3–1 **Twente**
    - Final standings: Ajax 73 points, Twente 71, PSV 69, AZ 59.
    - Ajax win the title for the 30th time.
- (Poland) Ekstraklasa, matchday 27: (team in **bold** qualifies for the UEFA Champions League)
  - **Wisła Kraków** 1–0 Cracovia
    - Standings: Wisła Kraków 53 points, Śląsk Wrocław 43.
    - Wisła Kraków win the title for the 12th time.
- (Romania) Liga I, matchday 33 (team in **bold** qualifies for the UEFA Champions League):
  - **Oțelul Galați** 2–1 Politehnica Timișoara
    - Standings: Oţelul Galaţi 67 points, FC Timişoara 63, Vaslui 62.
    - Oţelul Galaţi win the title for the first time.
- (Brazil) Campeonato Paulista Finals, second leg (first leg score in parentheses):
  - **Santos** 2–1 (0–0) Corinthians. Santos win 2–1 on aggregate.
    - Santos win the title for the second successive time and 19th time overall.
- (Latvia) Latvian Cup final in Riga: **FK Ventspils** 3–1 Liepājas Metalurgs
  - Ventspils win the Cup for the fifth time.

==== Golf ====
- PGA Tour:
  - The Players Championship in Ponte Vedra Beach, Florida:
    - Winner: K. J. Choi (KOR) 275 (−13)^{PO}
      - Choi defeats David Toms (USA) to claim his eighth PGA Tour title, and first since 2008.
- European Tour:
  - Iberdrola Open in Son Servera, Spain:
    - Winner: Darren Clarke (NIR) 274 (−6)
      - Clarke wins his 13th career European Tour title, and first since 2008.

==== Ice hockey ====
- Men's World Championship in Bratislava, Slovakia:
  - Bronze medal game: (bronze) **Czech Republic** 7–4 Russia
  - Gold medal game: (silver) Sweden 1–6 (gold) **Finland**
    - Finland win the title for the second time.
- Stanley Cup playoffs:
  - Western Conference finals: (series best-of-7; seeds in parentheses)
    - Game one in Vancouver: (1) Vancouver Canucks 3, (2) San Jose Sharks 2. Canucks lead series 1–0.

==== Motorcycle racing ====
- Moto GP:
  - French Grand Prix in Le Mans, France:
    - MotoGP: (1) Casey Stoner (AUS) (Honda) (2) Andrea Dovizioso (ITA) (Honda) (3) Valentino Rossi (ITA) (Ducati)
      - Riders' championship standings (after 4 of 18 races): (1) Jorge Lorenzo (ESP) (Yamaha) 78 points (2) Stoner 66 (3) Dani Pedrosa (ESP) (Honda) 61
    - Moto2: (1) Marc Márquez (ESP) (Suter) (2) Yuki Takahashi (JPN) (Moriwaki) (3) Stefan Bradl (GER) (Kalex)
      - Riders' championship standings (after 4 of 17 races): (1) Bradl 77 points (2) Julián Simón (ESP) (Suter) 49 (3) Andrea Iannone (ITA) (Suter) 48
    - 125cc: (1) Maverick Viñales (ESP) (Aprilia) (2) Nicolás Terol (ESP) (Aprilia) (3) Efrén Vázquez (ESP) (Derbi)
      - Riders' championship standings (after 4 of 17 races): (1) Terol 95 points (2) Sandro Cortese (GER) (Aprilia) 59 (3) Johann Zarco (FRA) (Derbi) 53

==== Rugby union ====
- (England) Aviva Premiership semi-final: **Saracens** 12–10 Gloucester

==== Surfing ====
- Women's World Tour:
  - Billabong Rio Pro at Rio de Janeiro, Brazil: (1) Carissa Moore (USA) (2) Sally Fitzgibbons (AUS) (3) Silvana Lima (BRA) & Stephanie Gilmore (AUS)
    - Standings (after 5 of 7 events): (1) Moore 47,000 points (2) Fitzgibbons 41,650 (3) Wright 30,620

==== Table tennis ====
- World Championships in Rotterdam, Netherlands:
  - Men's singles final: **Zhang Jike** (CHN) def. Wang Hao (CHN) 12–10, 11–7, 6–11, 9–11, 11–5, 14–12
    - Zhang wins his first world title.
    - A Chinese man wins the title for the fourth successive time.
  - Women's doubles final: **Guo Yue** / **Li Xiaoxia** (CHN) vs. Ding Ning / Guo Yan (CHN) 11–8, 11–5, 13–11, 11–8
    - Guo and Li win their second successive women's doubles title.
    - Guo wins her fifth world title.
    - A Chinese team win the title for the 12th successive time.

==== Tennis ====
- ATP World Tour:
  - Internazionali BNL d'Italia in Rome, Italy:
    - Final: **Novak Djokovic** (SRB) def. Rafael Nadal (ESP) 6–4, 6–4
      - Djokovic improves his winning streak to 39 matches in all and 37 this season, and defeats Nadal in a final for the fourth time in 2011. Djokovic wins his seventh title of the year and 25th of his career.
- WTA Tour:
  - Internazionali BNL d'Italia in Rome, Italy:
    - Final: **Maria Sharapova** (RUS) def. Samantha Stosur (AUS) 6–2, 6–4
      - Sharapova wins her 23rd career title.

=== May 14, 2011 (Saturday) ===
==== Auto racing ====
- Nationwide Series:
  - 5-hour Energy 200 in Dover, Delaware: (1) (Missouri) Carl Edwards (Ford; Roush Fenway Racing) (2) (Nevada) Kyle Busch (Toyota; Joe Gibbs Racing) (3) (Georgia (U.S. state)) Reed Sorenson (Chevrolet; Turner Motorsports)
    - Drivers' championship standings (after 11 of 34 races): (1) (Virginia) Elliott Sadler (Chevrolet; Kevin Harvick Incorporated) 379 points (2) Sorenson 369 (3) (California) Jason Leffler (Chevrolet; Turner Motorsports) 364

==== Cricket ====
- Pakistan in the West Indies:
  - 1st Test in Providence, Guyana; day 3: West Indies 226 & 152 (61.5 overs; Saeed Ajmal 6/42); Pakistan 160 & 80/3 (36 overs). Pakistan require another 139 runs with 7 wickets remaining.

==== Cycling ====
- Grand Tours:
  - Giro d'Italia, Stage 8: (gold) Oscar Gatto (ITA) (Farnese Vini–Neri Sottoli) 4h 59' 45" (silver) Alberto Contador (ESP) (Saxo Bank–SunGard) s.t. (bronze) Alessandro Petacchi (ITA) (Lampre–ISD) + 5"
    - General classification (after stage 8): (1) Pieter Weening (NED) (Rabobank) 28h 09' 49" (2) Kanstantsin Sivtsov (BLR) (HTC–Highroad) + 2" (3) Marco Pinotti (ITA) (HTC–Highroad) + 2"

==== Field hockey ====
- Women's Champions Challenge II in Vienna, Austria:
  - Semifinals:
    - Chile 0–1 **Belgium**
    - **Italy** 3–2 (a.e.t.) Belarus

==== Football (soccer) ====
- Friendly women's international (top 10 in FIFA Women's World Rankings):
  - (1) United States 2–0 (4) Japan
- (England) Premier League, matchday 37 (teams in **bold** qualify for the UEFA Champions League):
  - Blackburn Rovers 1–1 **Manchester United**
    - Standings: Manchester United 77 points, **Chelsea** 70 (36), **Arsenal** 67 (36), **Manchester City** 65 (36).
    - Manchester United win the Premier League for the 12th time and a record 19th league championship title.
- (England) FA Cup final in London: **Manchester City** 1–0 Stoke City
  - Manchester City win the Cup for the fifth time, and their first since 1969.
- Coupe de France Final in Saint-Denis: **Lille** 1–0 Paris Saint-Germain
  - Lille win the Cup for the first time in 56 years and sixth time overall.
- (Lithuania) Lithuanian Cup final in Alytus: **Ekranas** 4–2 (a.e.t.) Banga
  - Ekranas win the Cup for the second successive time, and fifth time overall.

==== Ice hockey ====
- Stanley Cup playoffs:
  - Eastern Conference finals: (series best-of-7; seeds in parentheses)
    - Game one in Boston: (5) Tampa Bay Lightning 5, (3) Boston Bruins 2. Lightning lead series 1–0.

==== Rugby union ====
- (England) Aviva Premiership semi-final: **Leicester Tigers** 11–3 Northampton Saints
- (France) Top 14 quarter-final: Castres 17–18 **Montpellier**
- (Ireland) (Italy) (Scotland) (Wales) Celtic League semi-final: **Munster** 18–11 Ospreys

==== Table tennis ====
- World Championships in Rotterdam, Netherlands:
  - Women's singles final: **Ding Ning** (CHN) def. Li Xiaoxia (CHN) 12–10, 13–11, 11–9, 8–11, 8–11, 11–7
    - Ding wins her first world title, as a Chinese woman wins the title for the ninth successive time.
  - Men's doubles final: **Ma Long**/**Xu Xin** (CHN) def. Chen Qi/Ma Lin (CHN) 11–3, 11–8, 4–11, 11–4, 11–7
    - Ma and Xu both win their first world title, as a Chinese team win the title for the tenth successive time.

=== May 13, 2011 (Friday) ===
==== Basketball ====
- NBA playoffs:
  - Western Conference semifinals: (series best-of-7; seeds in parentheses)
    - Game 6 in Memphis: (8) Memphis Grizzlies 95, (4) Oklahoma City Thunder 83. Series tied 3–3.

==== Cricket ====
- Pakistan in the West Indies:
  - 1st Test in Providence, Guyana; day 2: West Indies 226 (98 overs; Saeed Ajmal 5/69) & 34/2 (10.5 overs); Pakistan 160 (64.4 overs). West Indies lead by 100 runs with 8 wickets remaining.

==== Cycling ====
- Grand Tours:
  - Giro d'Italia, Stage 7: (gold) Bart De Clercq (BEL) (Omega Pharma–Lotto) 2h 54' 47" (silver) Michele Scarponi (ITA) (Lampre–ISD) s.t. (bronze) Roman Kreuziger (CZE) (Astana) s.t.
    - General classification (after stage 7): (1) Pieter Weening (NED) (Rabobank) 23h 09' 59" (2) Kanstantsin Sivtsov (BLR) (HTC–Highroad) + 2" (3) Marco Pinotti (ITA) (HTC–Highroad) + 2"

==== Equestrianism ====
- FEI Nations Cup Show Jumping:
  - Nations Cup of France in La Baule-Escoublac (CSIO 5*): (gold) Ireland (Shane Sweetnam, Billy Twomey, Cian O'Connor, Cameron Hanley) (silver) Belgium (Philippe Le Jeune, Dirk Demeersman, Judy-Ann Melchior, Jos Lansink) (bronze) Germany (Carsten-Otto Nagel, Philipp Weishaupt, Thomas Mühlbauer, Marcus Ehning)
- FEI Nations Cup Show Jumping – Promotional League, Europe:
  - Nations Cup of Austria in Linz (CSIO 4*): (gold) Germany (Jörg Oppermann, Jan Sprehe, David Will, Jürgen Kraus) (silver) Belgium (Patrick Spits, Peter Devos, Niels Bruynseels, Koen Vereecke) (bronze) Italy (Lucia Vizzini, Roberto Arioldi, Fabio Brotto, Davide Kainich) & Brazil (Pedro Veniss, Karina Harbich Johannpeter, Yuri Mansur Guerios, Carlos Motta Ribas)
    - Standings (after 2 of 7 competitions): (1) Italy & Brazil 12.5 points (3) Switzerland 9.5

==== Field hockey ====
- Women's Champions Challenge II in Vienna, Austria:
  - Fifth to eighth place classification:
    - **Russia** 3–2 Canada
    - **Malaysia** 7–0 Austria

==== Football (soccer) ====
- CAF Champions League Second round, second leg (first leg score in parentheses):
  - ES Sétif (Algeria) 2–0 (1–4) (Cameroon) **Cotonsport**. Cotonsport win 4–3 on aggregate.
- (Moldova) Divizia Naţională, matchday 37 (team in **bold** qualifies for the UEFA Champions League):
  - Dinamo Bendery 0–7 Sheriff Tiraspol
  - Costuleni 0–1 **Dacia Chișinău**
    - Standings: Dacia Chişinău 86 points, Sheriff Tiraspol 77, Milsami 72.
    - Dacia Chişinău win the title for the first time, ending Sheriff Tiraspol's run of ten consecutive titles.

==== Ice hockey ====
- Men's World Championship in Bratislava, Slovakia:
  - Semifinals:
    - Czech Republic 2–5 **Sweden**
    - **Finland** 3–0 Russia

==== Rugby union ====
- (France) Top 14 quarter-final: **Clermont** 27–17 Biarritz
- (Ireland) (Italy) (Scotland) (Wales) Celtic League semi-final: **Leinster** 18–3 Ulster

==== Table tennis ====
- World Championships in Rotterdam, Netherlands:
  - Mixed doubles final: **Zhang Chao**/**Cao Zhen** (CHN) def. Hao Shuai/Mu Zi (CHN) 11–7, 11–7, 11–9, 9–11, 11–8
    - Cao wins her second consecutive world title, and Zhang wins his first.
    - A Chinese couple win the title for the 11th successive time.

=== May 12, 2011 (Thursday) ===
==== Basketball ====
- NBA playoffs:
  - Eastern Conference semifinals: (series best-of-7; seeds in parentheses)
    - Game 6 in Atlanta: (1) Chicago Bulls 93, (5) Atlanta Hawks 73. **Bulls win series 4–2.**

==== Cricket ====
- Pakistan in the West Indies:
  - 1st Test in Providence, Guyana; day 1: West Indies 209/9 (90 overs); Pakistan.

==== Cycling ====
- Grand Tours:
  - Giro d'Italia, Stage 6: (gold) Francisco Ventoso (ESP) (Movistar Team) 5h 15' 39" (silver) Alessandro Petacchi (ITA) (Lampre–ISD) s.t. (bronze) Roberto Ferrari (ITA) (Androni Giocattoli) s.t.
    - General classification (after stage 6): (1) Pieter Weening (NED) (Rabobank) 20h 15' 12" (2) Kanstantsin Sivtsov (BLR) (HTC–Highroad) + 2" (3) Marco Pinotti (ITA) (HTC–Highroad) + 2"

==== Darts ====
- Premier League, week 14 in Newcastle, England (players in **bold** qualify for the playoffs):
  - James Wade (ENG) 8–4 Terry Jenkins (ENG)
  - Mark Webster (WAL) 4–8 **Raymond van Barneveld** (NED)
  - **Adrian Lewis** (ENG) 7–7 **Gary Anderson** (SCO)
  - **Phil Taylor** (ENG) 8–3 Simon Whitlock (AUS)
    - Final standings: Taylor 26 points, van Barneveld 18, Anderson 17, Lewis 14, Wade 13, Whitlock 11, Jenkins 8, Webster 5.

==== Field hockey ====
- Women's Champions Challenge II in Vienna, Austria:
  - Quarterfinals:
    - **Chile** 3–2 Russia
    - **Belgium** 1–0 Canada
    - **Italy** 2–1 Malaysia
    - **Belarus** 4–1 Austria

==== Football (soccer) ====
- European Under-17 Championship in Serbia:
  - Semifinals:
    - **Netherlands** 1–0 England
    - Denmark 0–2 **Germany**
- Copa Libertadores Quarterfinals, first leg:
  - Vélez Sarsfield (Argentina) 3–0 (Paraguay) Libertad
  - Chiapas (Mexico) 1–1 (Paraguay) Cerro Porteño

==== Ice hockey ====
- Men's World Championship in Slovakia:
  - Quarterfinals in Bratislava:
    - **Finland** 4–1 Norway
    - Canada 1–2 **Russia**
- Stanley Cup playoffs:
  - Western Conference semifinals: (series best-of-7; seeds in parentheses)
    - Game seven in San Jose: (2) San Jose Sharks 3, (3) Detroit Red Wings 2. **Sharks win series 4–3.**

=== May 11, 2011 (Wednesday) ===
==== Basketball ====
- NBA playoffs (all series best-of-7; seeds in parentheses):
  - Eastern Conference semifinals:
    - Game 5 in Miami: (2) Miami Heat 97, (3) Boston Celtics 87. **Heat win series 4–1.**
  - Western Conference semifinals:
    - Game 5 in Oklahoma City: (4) Oklahoma City Thunder 99, (8) Memphis Grizzlies 72. Thunder lead series 3–2.

==== Cycling ====
- Grand Tours:
  - Giro d'Italia, Stage 5: (gold) Pieter Weening (NED) (Rabobank) 4h 54' 49" (silver) Fabio Duarte (COL) (Geox–TMC) + 8" (bronze) José Serpa (COL) (Androni Giocattoli) + 8"
    - General classification (after stage 5): (1) Weening 14h 59' 33" (2) Marco Pinotti (ITA) (HTC–Highroad) + 2" (3) Kanstantsin Sivtsov (BLR) (HTC–Highroad) + 2"

==== Football (soccer) ====
- AFC Champions League group stage, matchday 6:
  - Group A:
    - Al-Jazira (United Arab Emirates) 1–4 (Iran) **Sepahan**
    - **Al-Hilal** (Saudi Arabia) 2–0 (Qatar) Al-Gharafa
      - Final standings: Sepahan, Al-Hilal 13 points, Al-Gharafa 7, Al-Jazira 1.
  - Group B:
    - Pakhtakor (Uzbekistan) 1–1 (Qatar) **Al-Sadd**
    - Esteghlal (Iran) 2–1 (Saudi Arabia) **Al-Nassr**
      - Final standings: Al-Sadd 10 points, Al-Nassr, Esteghlal 8, Pakhtakor 5.
  - Group E:
    - **Gamba Osaka** (Japan) 2–0 (China) **Tianjin Teda**
    - Jeju United (South Korea) 1–1 (Australia) Melbourne Victory
      - Final standings: Gamba Osaka, Tianjin Teda 10 points, Jeju United 7, Melbourne Victory 6.
  - Group F:
    - Hangzhou Greentown (China) 1–1 (South Korea) **FC Seoul**
    - Al-Ain (United Arab Emirates) 3–1 (Japan) **Nagoya Grampus**
      - Final standings: FC Seoul 11 points, Nagoya Grampus 10, Al-Ain 7, Hangzhou Greentown 5.
- AFC Cup group stage, matchday 6:
  - Group A
    - **Dempo** (India) 2–1 (Lebanon) Al-Ansar
    - **Nasaf Qarshi** (Uzbekistan) 7–1 (Yemen) Al-Tilal
      - Final standings: Nasaf Qarshi 18 points, Dempo 7, Al-Ansar 6, Al-Tilal 4.
  - Group B
    - Al-Saqr (Yemen) 0–1 (Uzbekistan) **Shurtan Guzar**
    - **Al-Qadsia** (Kuwait) 3–2 (Syria) Al-Ittihad
      - Final standings: Al-Qadsia 14 points, Shurtan Guzar 9, Al-Ittihad 8, Al-Saqr 1.
  - Group E
    - **Al Ahed** (Lebanon) 2–0 (Oman) Al-Oruba
    - Al-Karamah (Syria) 0–3 (Iraq) **Arbil**
      - Final standings: Arbil 14 points, Al Ahed, Al-Oruba, Al-Karamah 6.
  - Group F
    - **Sriwijaya** (Indonesia) 3–2 (Hong Kong) TSW Pegasus
    - **Sông Lam Nghệ An** (Vietnam) 4–2 (Maldives) VB
      - Final standings: Sông Lam Nghệ An 12 points, Sriwijaya 10, TSW Pegasus 9, VB 4.
- Copa Libertadores Quarterfinals, first leg:
  - Once Caldas (Colombia) 0–1 (Brazil) Santos
  - Peñarol (Uruguay) 2–0 (Chile) Universidad Católica
- (Spain) La Liga, matchday 36 (teams in **bold** qualify for the UEFA Champions League):
  - Levante 1–1 **Barcelona**
    - Standings: Barcelona 92 points, **Real Madrid** 86, **Valencia** 67, **Villarreal** 62.
    - Barcelona win their third consecutive title, and their 21st overall.
- (Hungary) Nemzeti Bajnokság I, matchday 28 (team in **bold** qualifies for the UEFA Champions League):
  - **Videoton** 3–1 Kaposvár
    - Standings: Videoton 58 points, Paksi 50, Ferencváros 46.
    - Videoton win the title for the first time.
- (Turkey) Turkish Cup final in Kayseri: **Beşiktaş** 2–2 (4–3 pen.) Istanbul BB
  - Beşiktaş win the Cup for the ninth time.
- (Serbia) Serbian Cup final in Belgrade: Vojvodina 1–2 Partizan. Abandoned after 83 minutes.
  - Partizan win the Cup for the third time.
- (Croatia) Croatian Cup final, first leg: Dinamo Zagreb 5–1 Varaždin
- (Armenia) Armenian Cup final in Yerevan: Shirak 1–4 **Mika**
  - Mika win the Cup for a record sixth time.

==== Ice hockey ====
- Men's World Championship in Slovakia:
  - Quarterfinals in Bratislava:
    - **Czech Republic** 4–0 United States
    - **Sweden** 5–2 Germany

=== May 10, 2011 (Tuesday) ===
==== Basketball ====
- NBA playoffs:
  - Eastern Conference semifinals: (series best-of-7; seeds in parentheses)
    - Game 5 in Chicago: (1) Chicago Bulls 95, (5) Atlanta Hawks 83. Bulls lead series 3–2.

==== Cycling ====
- Grand Tours:
  - Giro d'Italia, Stage 4: After Wouter Weylandt's fatal crash on Stage 3, the stage is neutralised, and run as an homage to Weylandt and thus would not count towards the overall classification.
    - General classification (after stage 4): (1) David Millar (GBR) (Garmin–Cervélo) 10h 04' 29" (2) Ángel Vicioso (ESP) (Androni Giocattoli) + 7" (3) Kanstantsin Sivtsov (BLR) (HTC–Highroad) + 9"

==== Field hockey ====
- Women's Champions Challenge II in Vienna, Austria:
  - Pool A:
    - Italy 2–1 Canada
    - Chile 5–1 Austria
      - Final standings: Chile, Italy, Canada 6 points, Austria 0.
  - Pool B:
    - Malaysia 2–2 Russia
    - Belgium 2–3 Belarus
      - Final standings: Belarus 9 points, Belgium 6, Malaysia, Russia 1.

==== Football (soccer) ====
- AFC Champions League group stage, matchday 6 (teams in **bold** advance to the knockout stage):
  - Group C:
    - Al-Wahda (United Arab Emirates) 2–0 (Iran) Persepolis
    - **Al-Ittihad** (Saudi Arabia) 1–1 (Uzbekistan) **Bunyodkor**
      - Final standings: Al-Ittihad 11 points, Bunyodkor 9, Al-Wahda 6, Persepolis 5.
  - Group D:
    - Al-Rayyan (Qatar) 2–0 (United Arab Emirates) Emirates
    - **Zob Ahan** (Iran) 0–1 (Saudi Arabia) **Al-Shabab**
      - Final standings: Zob Ahan 13 points, Al-Shabab 11, Emirates 6, Al-Rayyan 4.
  - Group G:
    - **Jeonbuk Hyundai Motors** (South Korea) 6–0 (Indonesia) Arema
    - **Cerezo Osaka** (Japan) 4–0 (China) Shandong Luneng
      - Final standings: Jeonbuk Hyundai Motors 15 points, Cerezo Osaka 12, Shandong Luneng 7, Arema 1.
  - Group H:
    - **Kashima Antlers** (Japan) 2–1 (Australia) Sydney FC
    - Shanghai Shenhua (China) 0–3 (South Korea) **Suwon Samsung Bluewings**
      - Final standings: Suwon Samsung Bluewings, Kashima Antlers 12 points, Sydney FC 5, Shanghai Shenhua 2.
- AFC Cup group stage, matchday 6 (teams in **bold** advance to the knockout stage):
  - Group C:
    - **Al-Faisaly** (Jordan) 0–0 (Iraq) **Duhok**
    - Al-Nasr (Kuwait) 0–4 (Syria) Al-Jaish
      - Final standings: Duhok, Al-Faisaly, Al-Jaish 11 points, Al-Nasr 0.
  - Group D:
    - Al-Talaba (Iraq) 1–2 **Al-Kuwait**
    - Al-Suwaiq (Oman) 1–1 (Jordan) **Al-Wehdat**
      - Final standings: Al-Wehdat 14 points, Al-Kuwait 10, Al-Talaba 5, Al-Suwaiq 3.
  - Group G:
    - Victory (Maldives) 0–1 (Vietnam) Hà Nội T&T
    - **Muangthong United** (Thailand) 4–0 (Singapore) **Tampines Rovers**
      - Final standings: Muangthong United 14 points, Tampines Rovers 11, Hà Nội T&T 8, Victory 0.
  - Group H:
    - Kingfisher East Bengal (India) 1–1 (Indonesia) **Persipura Jayapura**
    - South China (Hong Kong) 0–3 (Thailand) **Chonburi**
      - Final standings: Chonburi 13 points, Persipura Jayapura 11, South China 5, Kingfisher East Bengal 3.
- (Estonia) Estonian Cup final in Tallinn: **Flora** 2–0 Narva Trans
  - Flora win the Cup for the fifth time.

==== Ice hockey ====
- Stanley Cup playoffs:
  - Western Conference semifinals: (series best-of-7; seeds in parentheses)
    - Game six in Detroit: (3) Detroit Red Wings 3, (2) San Jose Sharks 1. Series tied 3–3.

=== May 9, 2011 (Monday) ===
==== Basketball ====
- NBA playoffs (all series best-of-7; seeds in parentheses):
  - Eastern Conference semifinals:
    - Game 4 in Boston: (2) Miami Heat 98, (3) Boston Celtics 90. Heat lead series 3–1.
  - Western Conference semifinals:
    - Game 4 in Memphis: (4) Oklahoma City Thunder 133, (8) Memphis Grizzlies 123 (3OT). Series tied 2–2.

==== Cycling ====
- Grand Tours:
  - Giro d'Italia, Stage 3: (gold) Ángel Vicioso (ESP) (Androni Giocattoli) 3h 57' 38" (silver) David Millar (GBR) (Garmin–Cervélo) s.t. (bronze) Pablo Lastras (ESP) (Movistar Team) s.t.
    - General classification (after stage 3): (1) Millar 10h 04' 29" (2) Vicioso + 7" (3) Kanstantsin Sivtsov (BLR) (HTC–Highroad) + 9"
    - Leopard Trek rider Wouter Weylandt is fatally injured in a crash, 25 kilometres (15.5 miles) from the end of the stage. He is the first rider to be killed in the Giro since Emilio Ravasio in 1986, and the first to be killed in a Grand Tour since Fabio Casartelli in the 1995 Tour de France.

==== Football (soccer) ====
- European Under-17 Championship in Serbia (teams in **bold** advance to the semi-finals and qualify for FIFA U-17 World Cup):
  - Group A:
    - **England** 3–0 Serbia
    - **Denmark** 1–0 France
      - Final standings: Denmark 9 points, England 4, France 2, Serbia 1.
  - Group B:
    - Romania 0–1 **Germany**
    - **Netherlands** 0–0 Czech Republic
      - Final standings: Netherlands 7 points, Germany 4, Czech Republic 3, Romania 1.

==== Ice hockey ====
- Men's World Championship in Slovakia (teams in **bold** advance to the playoff round):
  - Qualifying round:
    - Group E in Bratislava:
      - Slovakia 4–1 Denmark
      - **Russia** 2–3 (SO) **Finland**
      - **Germany** 2–5 **Czech Republic**
        - Final standings: Czech Republic 15 points, Finland 10, Germany 8, Russia 7, Slovakia 3, Denmark 2.
    - Group F in Košice:
      - France 2–5 **Norway**
      - Switzerland 5–3 **United States**
      - **Canada** 3–2 **Sweden**
        - Final standings: Canada 13 points, Sweden 10, Norway 8, United States 7, Switzerland 6, France 1.
- Stanley Cup playoffs:
  - Western Conference semifinals: (series best-of-7; seeds in parentheses)
    - Game six in Nashville: (1) Vancouver Canucks 2, (5) Nashville Predators 1. **Canucks win series 4–2.**

=== May 8, 2011 (Sunday) ===
==== Auto racing ====
- Formula One:
  - Turkish Grand Prix in Istanbul, Turkey: (1) Sebastian Vettel (GER) (Red Bull–Renault) (2) Mark Webber (AUS) (Red Bull-Renault) (3) Fernando Alonso (ESP) (Ferrari)
    - Drivers' championship standings (after 4 of 19 races): (1) Vettel 93 points (2) Lewis Hamilton (GBR) (McLaren–Mercedes) 59 (3) Webber 55
- World Rally Championship:
  - Rally d'Italia Sardegna in Olbia, Italy: (1) Sébastien Loeb (FRA)/Daniel Elena (MON) (Citroën DS3 WRC) (2) Mikko Hirvonen (FIN)/Jarmo Lehtinen (FIN) (Ford Fiesta RS WRC) (3) Petter Solberg (NOR)/Chris Patterson (GBR) (Citroën DS3 WRC)
    - Drivers' championship standings (after 5 of 13 rallies): (1) Loeb 100 points (2) Hirvonen 93 (3) Sébastien Ogier (FRA) (Citroën DS3 WRC) 81

==== Basketball ====
- Euroleague Final Four in Barcelona, Spain
  - Third-place playoff: **Montepaschi Siena** (Italy) 80–62 (Spain) Real Madrid
  - Final: **Panathinaikos BC** (Greece) 78–70 (Israel) Maccabi Tel Aviv
    - Panathinaikos win the title for the sixth time.
    - Željko Obradović wins his eighth Euroleague title as head coach.
- NBA playoffs (all series best-of-7; seeds in parentheses):
  - Eastern Conference semifinals:
    - Game 4 in Atlanta: (5) Atlanta Hawks 100, (1) Chicago Bulls 88. Series tied 2–2.
  - Western Conference semifinals:
    - Game 4 in Dallas: (3) Dallas Mavericks 122, (2) Los Angeles Lakers 86. **Mavericks win series 4–0.**
- PBA Commissioner's Cup finals in Quezon City, Philippines:
  - Game 6: Talk 'N Text Tropang Texters 99, Barangay Ginebra Kings 96 (OT). **Texters win series 4–2.**
    - Talk 'N Text win their second title of the PBA season.

==== Cycling ====
- Grand Tours:
  - Giro d'Italia, Stage 2: (gold) Alessandro Petacchi (ITA) (Lampre–ISD) 5h 45' 40" (silver) Mark Cavendish (GBR) (HTC–Highroad) s.t. (bronze) Manuel Belletti (ITA) (Colnago–CSF Inox) s.t.
    - General classification (after stage 2): (1) Cavendish 6h 06' 27" (2) Kanstantsin Sivtsov (BLR) (HTC–Highroad) + 12" (3) Craig Lewis (USA) (HTC–Highroad) + 12"

==== Field hockey ====
- Women's Champions Challenge II in Vienna, Austria:
  - Pool A:
    - Chile 0–1 Canada
    - Italy 4–1 Austria
      - Standings (after 2 matches): Canada 6 points, Italy, Chile 3, Austria 0.
  - Pool B:
    - Russia 0–4 Belgium
    - Malaysia 4–5 Belarus
      - Standings (after 2 matches): Belgium, Belarus 6 points, Malaysia, Russia 0.

==== Football (soccer) ====
- CAF Champions League Second round:
  - Second leg (first leg score in parentheses):
    - **Al-Ahly** (Egypt) 1–0 (0–0) (Zambia) ZESCO United. Al-Ahly win 1–0 on aggregate.
    - Diaraf (Senegal) 0–1 (0–5) (Tunisia) **Espérance ST**. Espérance ST win 6–0 on aggregate.
    - **TP Mazembe** (Democratic Republic of the Congo) 2–0 (0–1) (Morocco) Wydad Casablanca. TP Mazembe win 2–1 on aggregate.
  - Only leg: **Enyimba** (Nigeria) 1–0 (Libya) Ittihad
- CAF Confederation Cup Second round, second leg (first leg score in parentheses):
  - **Sofapaka** (Kenya) 1–0 (1–2) (Democratic Republic of the Congo) Saint Eloi Lupopo. 2–2 on aggregate, Sofapaka win on away goals.
  - USFA (Burkina Faso) 1–0 (0–2) (Nigeria) **Sunshine Stars**. Sunshine Stars win 2–1 on aggregate.
  - **Motema Pembe** (Democratic Republic of the Congo) 2–1 (1–2) (Egypt) Haras El Hodood. 3–3 on aggregate, Motema Pembe win 4–3 on penalties.
  - AS Adema (Madagascar) 1–0 (0–3) (Morocco) **Difaa El Jadida**. Difaa El Jadida win 3–1 on aggregate.
- (Netherlands) KNVB Cup final in Rotterdam: **Twente** 3–2 (a.e.t.) Ajax
  - Twente win the Cup for the third time.
- (Slovakia) Slovak Cup final in Banská Bystrica: **Slovan Bratislava** 3–3 (5–4 pen.) Žilina
  - Slovan Bratislava win the Cup for the second successive time and 12th time overall.
- (Wales) Welsh Cup final in Llanelli: Bangor City 1–4 **Llanelli**
  - Llanelli win the Cup for the first time.
- (Andorra) Copa Constitució Final in Aixovall: Santa Coloma 1–3 (a.e.t.) **Sant Julià**
  - Sant Julià win the Cup for the second successive time and third time overall.
- (Brazil) Campeonato Paulista Finals, first leg: Corinthians 0–0 Santos

==== Golf ====
- Senior majors:
  - Regions Tradition in Birmingham, Alabama:
    - Leaderboard after final round: (T1) Tom Lehman (USA) & Peter Senior (AUS) 275 (−13) (3) Loren Roberts (USA) 277 (−11)
      - Lehman defeats Senior on the second playoff hole to win his second senior major, his third Champions Tour title of the season, and fifth of his career.
- PGA Tour:
  - Wells Fargo Championship in Charlotte, North Carolina:
    - Winner: Lucas Glover (USA) 273 (−15)^{PO}
      - Glover defeats Jonathan Byrd (USA) on the first playoff hole to win his third PGA Tour title.
- European Tour:
  - Open de España in Seville, Spain:
    - Winner: Thomas Aiken (RSA) 278 (−10)
      - Aiken wins his first European Tour title.

==== Ice hockey ====
- Men's World Championship in Slovakia:
  - Qualifying round (teams in **bold** advance to the playoff round):
    - Group E in Bratislava: **Czech Republic** 3–2 **Russia**
      - Standings (after 4 games): Czech Republic 12 points, **Finland**, **Germany** 8, Russia 6, Denmark 2, Slovakia 0.
    - Group F in Košice: **Sweden** 2–0 Switzerland
      - Standings (after 4 games): **Canada**, Sweden 10 points, **United States** 7, Norway 5, Switzerland 3, France 1.
  - Relegation round: (teams in ~~strike~~ are relegated to Division I in 2012)
    - ~~Slovenia~~ 1–7 Belarus in Bratislava
    - Latvia 4–1 ~~Austria~~ in Košice
      - Final standings: Belarus, Latvia 6 points, Slovenia, Austria 3.
- Stanley Cup playoffs:
  - Western Conference semifinals: (series best-of-7; seeds in parentheses)
    - Game five in San Jose: (3) Detroit Red Wings 4, (2) San Jose Sharks 3. Sharks lead series 3–2.

==== Motorcycle racing ====
- Superbike:
  - Monza World Championship round in Monza, Italy:
    - Race 1: (1) Eugene Laverty (IRL) (Yamaha YZF-R1) (2) Max Biaggi (ITA) (Aprilia RSV4) (3) Leon Haslam (GBR) (BMW S1000RR)
    - Race 2: (1) Laverty (2) Marco Melandri (ITA) (Yamaha YZF-R1) (3) Michel Fabrizio (ITA) (Suzuki GSX-R1000)
      - Riders' championship standings (after 4 of 13 rounds): (1) Carlos Checa (ESP) (Ducati 1198) 145 points (2) Melandri 118 (3) Biaggi 117
- Supersport:
  - Monza World Championship round in Monza, Italy: (1) Chaz Davies (GBR) (Yamaha YZF-R6) (2) Luca Scassa (ITA) (Yamaha YZF-R6) (3) Fabien Foret (FRA) (Honda CBR600RR)
    - Riders' championship standings (after 4 of 12 rounds): (1) Davies & Scassa 70 points (3) Broc Parkes (AUS) (Kawasaki Ninja ZX-6R) 60

==== Tennis ====
- ATP World Tour:
  - Mutua Madrid Open in Madrid, Spain:
    - Final: **Novak Djokovic** (SRB) def. Rafael Nadal (ESP) 7–5, 6–4
      - Djokovic improves his winning streak to 34 matches in all and 32 this season, and defeats Nadal in a final for the third time in 2011. He also ends Nadal's 37-match winning streak on clay dating back to the 2009 French Open. Djokovic wins his sixth title of the year and 24th of his career.
- WTA Tour:
  - Mutua Madrid Open in Madrid, Spain:
    - Final: **Petra Kvitová** (CZE) def. Victoria Azarenka (BLR) 7–6(3), 6–4
      - Kvitová wins her third title of the year and fourth of her career.

=== May 7, 2011 (Saturday) ===
==== Auto racing ====
- Sprint Cup Series:
  - Showtime Southern 500 in Darlington, South Carolina: (1) (New York (state)) Regan Smith (Chevrolet; Furniture Row Racing) (2) (Missouri) Carl Edwards (Ford; Roush Fenway Racing) (3) (Michigan) Brad Keselowski (Dodge; Penske Racing)
    - Drivers' championship standings (after 10 of 36 races): (1) Edwards 378 points (2) (California) Jimmie Johnson (Chevrolet; Hendrick Motorsports) 355 (3) (Nevada) Kyle Busch (Toyota; Joe Gibbs Racing) 339
- Intercontinental Le Mans Cup:
  - 1000 km of Spa at Spa, Belgium: (1) (France) #7 Peugeot Sport Total (Alexander Wurz (AUT), Anthony Davidson (GBR), Marc Gené (ESP)) (2) (France) #8 Peugeot Sport Total (Franck Montagny (FRA), Stéphane Sarrazin (FRA), Nicolas Minassian (FRA)) (3) (Germany) #3 Audi Sport North America (Allan McNish (GBR), Rinaldo Capello (ITA), Tom Kristensen (DEN))

==== Basketball ====
- NBA playoffs (all series best-of-7; seeds in parentheses):
  - Eastern Conference semifinals:
    - Game 3 in Boston: (3) Boston Celtics 97, (2) Miami Heat 81. Heat lead series 2–1.
  - Western Conference semifinals:
    - Game 3 in Memphis: (8) Memphis Grizzlies 101, (4) Oklahoma City Thunder 93 (OT). Grizzlies lead series 2–1.

==== Cycling ====
- Grand Tours:
  - Giro d'Italia, Stage 1: (gold) HTC–Highroad 20' 59" (silver) Team RadioShack + 10" (bronze) Liquigas–Cannondale + 22"
    - General classification (after stage 1): (1) Marco Pinotti (ITA) (HTC–Highroad) 20' 59" (2) Lars Bak (DEN) (HTC–Highroad) + 0" (3) Kanstantsin Sivtsov (BLR) (HTC–Highroad) + 0"

==== Equestrianism ====
- Show jumping – Global Champions Tour:
  - 2nd Competition in Valencia (CSI 5*): (gold) Billy Twomey (IRL) on Je t'aime Flamenco (silver) Ludger Beerbaum (GER) on Gotha FRH (bronze) Maikel van der Vleuten (NED) on Verdi
    - Standings (after 2 of 10 competitions): (1) Álvaro de Miranda Neto (BRA) 66 points (2) Denis Lynch (IRL) 64 (2) Lars Nieberg (GER) 58

==== Field hockey ====
- Women's Champions Challenge II in Vienna, Austria:
  - Pool A:
    - Chile 2–1 Italy
    - Canada 2–1 Austria
  - Pool B:
    - Belgium 0–4 Malaysia
    - Russia 4–3 Belarus

==== Football (soccer) ====
- CAF Champions League Second round:
  - Second leg (first leg score in parentheses):
    - **MC Alger** (Algeria) 3–2 (1–1) (Angola) Inter Luanda. MC Alger win 4–3 on aggregate.
    - Club Africain (Tunisia) 1–1 (0–1) (Sudan) Al-Hilal. Abandoned due to crowd violence. Al-Hilal advance to the group stage.
  - First leg: Cotonsport (Cameroon) 4–1 (Algeria) ES Sétif
  - Only leg: **Raja Casablanca** (Morocco) 1–1 (5–4 pen.) (Ivory Coast) ASEC Mimosas
- CAF Confederation Cup Second round, second leg (first leg score in parentheses):
  - **1º de Agosto** (Angola) 1–0 (1–1) (Morocco) FUS Rabat. 1º de Agosto win 2–1 on aggregate.
  - Al-Khartoum (Sudan) 2–0 (1–5) (Morocco) **Maghreb Fez**. Maghreb Fez win 5–3 on aggregate.
- (Italy) Serie A, matchday 36 (teams in **bold** qualify for the UEFA Champions League):
  - Roma 0–0 **Milan**
    - Standings: Milan 78 points (36 matches), **Internazionale** 69 (35), **Napoli** 68 (35).
    - Milan win the Scudetto for the 18th time and their first since 2003–04.
- (Ukraine) Premier League, matchday 28 (teams in **bold** qualify for the UEFA Champions League, teams in italics qualify for the UEFA Europa League):
  - Zorya Luhansk 0–1 Dnipro
  - Karpaty Lviv 1–2 **FC Dynamo Kyiv**
  - **Shakhtar Donetsk** 2–0 Metalurh Donetsk
    - Standings: Shakhtar Donetsk 70 points, Dynamo Kyiv 62, Dnipro Dnipropetrovsk 53.
    - Shakhtar win the title for the second successive time and sixth time overall.
- (Northern Ireland) Irish Cup final in Belfast: Crusaders 1–2 **Linfield**
  - Linfield win the Cup for the second successive time and 41st time overall.

==== Golf ====
- Senior majors:
  - Regions Tradition in Birmingham, Alabama:
    - Leaderboard after third round (all USA): (1) Mark Calcavecchia 204 (−12) (2) Jay Haas 205 (−11) (T3) Tom Pernice Jr. & Tom Lehman 206 (−10)

==== Horse racing ====
- U.S. Thoroughbred Triple Crown:
  - Kentucky Derby in Louisville: (gold) Animal Kingdom (trainer: H. Graham Motion; jockey: John R. Velazquez) (silver) Nehro (trainer: Steve Asmussen; jockey: Corey Nakatani) (bronze) Mucho Macho Man (trainer: Katherine Ritvo; jockey: Rajiv Maragh)

==== Ice hockey ====
- Men's World Championship in Slovakia:
  - Qualifying round (teams in **bold** advance to the playoff round):
    - Group E in Bratislava:
      - Denmark 4–3 (SO) **Germany**
      - **Finland** 2–1 Slovakia
        - Standings: **Czech Republic** 9 points (3 games), Finland, Germany 8 (4), **Russia** 6 (3), Denmark 2 (4), Slovakia 0 (4).
    - Group F in Košice:
      - Norway 2–3 **Canada**
      - United States 3–2 France
        - Standings: Canada 10 points (4 games), Sweden 7 (3), United States 7 (4), Norway 5 (4), Switzerland 3 (3), France 1 (4).
  - Relegation round:
    - Austria 3–2 Slovenia in Bratislava
    - Belarus 3–6 Latvia in Košice
      - Standings (after 2 games): Belarus, Slovenia, Latvia, Austria 3 points.
- Stanley Cup playoffs:
  - Western Conference semifinals: (series best-of-7; seeds in parentheses)
    - Game five in Vancouver: (5) Nashville Predators 4, (1) Vancouver Canucks 3. Canucks lead series 3–2.

=== May 6, 2011 (Friday) ===
==== Athletics ====
- IAAF Diamond League:
  - Qatar Athletic Super Grand Prix in Doha, Qatar:
    - Men:
      - 200m: Walter Dix (USA) 20.06
      - 400m hurdles: L. J. van Zyl (RSA) 48.11
      - 800m: Asbel Kiprop (KEN) 1:44.74
      - 1500m: Nixon Kiplimo Chepseba (KEN) 3:31.84
      - 3000m: Yenew Alamirew (ETH) 7:27.26
      - Discus throw: Gerd Kanter (EST) 67.49m
      - High jump: Jesse Williams (USA) 2.33m
      - Javelin throw: Petr Frydrych (CZE) 85.32m
      - Pole vault: Malte Mohr (GER) 5.81m
      - Shot put: Dylan Armstrong (CAN) 21.38m
      - Triple jump: Teddy Tamgho (FRA) 17.49m
    - Women:
      - 100m hurdles: Kellie Wells (USA) 12.58
      - 200m: LaShauntea Moore (USA) 22.83
      - 400m: Allyson Felix (USA) 50.33
      - 1500m: Anna Mishchenko (UKR) 4:03.00
      - 3000m steeplechase: Milcah Chemos Cheywa (KEN) 9:16.44
      - Long jump: Funmi Jimoh (USA) 6.88m

==== Auto racing ====
- Nationwide Series:
  - Royal Purple 200 in Darlington, South Carolina: (1) (Nevada) Kyle Busch (Toyota; Joe Gibbs Racing) (2) (Virginia) Denny Hamlin (Toyota; Joe Gibbs Racing) (3) (Virginia) Elliott Sadler (Chevrolet; Kevin Harvick Incorporated)
    - Drivers' championship standings (after 10 of 34 races): (1) (Illinois) Justin Allgaier (Chevrolet; Turner Motorsports) 346 points (2) Sadler 341 (3) (California) Jason Leffler (Chevrolet; Turner Motorsports) 331

==== Basketball ====
- Euroleague Final Four in Barcelona, Spain:
  - Semifinals:
    - **Panathinaikos BC** (Greece) 77–69 (Italy) Montepaschi Siena
      - Panathinaikos reach the final for the seventh time.
    - **Maccabi Tel Aviv** (Israel) 82–63 (Spain) Real Madrid
      - Maccabi Tel Aviv reach the final for the 14th time, equalling the record with Real Madrid.
      - Maccabi and Panathinaikos will meet in a repeat of 2000 and 2001 finals.
- NBA playoffs (all series best-of-7; seeds in parentheses):
  - Eastern Conference semifinals:
    - Game 3 in Atlanta: (1) Chicago Bulls 99, (5) Atlanta Hawks 82. Bulls lead series 2–1.
  - Western Conference semifinals:
    - Game 3 in Dallas: (3) Dallas Mavericks 98, (2) Los Angeles Lakers 92. Mavericks lead series 3–0.

==== Football (soccer) ====
- European Under-17 Championship in Serbia (teams in **bold** advance to the semi-finals and qualify for FIFA U-17 World Cup):
  - Group A:
    - Serbia 1–1 France
    - **Denmark** 2–0 England
      - Standings (after 2 matches): Denmark 6 points, France 2, Serbia, England 1.
  - Group B:
    - Germany 1–1 Czech Republic
    - **Netherlands** 1–0 Romania
      - Standings (after 2 matches): Netherlands 6 points, Czech Republic 2, Romania, Germany 1.
- CAF Confederation Cup Second round, second leg (first leg score in parentheses):
  - **JS Kabylie** (Algeria) 3–0 (0–3) (Gabon) Missile. 3–3 on aggregate; JS Kabylie win 3–0 on penalties.

==== Golf ====
- Senior majors:
  - Regions Tradition in Birmingham, Alabama:
    - Leaderboard after second round (all USA): (1) Mark Calcavecchia 133 (−11) (2) Kenny Perry 136 (−8) (T3) Michael Allen & Jay Haas 137 (−7)

==== Ice hockey ====
- Men's World Championship in Slovakia (teams in **bold** advance to the playoff round):
  - Qualifying round:
    - Group E in Bratislava:
      - **Germany** 4–5 (SO) Finland
      - **Czech Republic** 3–2 Slovakia
        - Standings (after 3 games): Czech Republic 9 points, Germany 7, Russia 6, Finland 5, Slovakia, Denmark 0.
    - Group F in Košice:
      - Canada 4–3 (SO) United States
      - Sweden 4–0 France
        - Standings (after 3 games): Canada, Sweden 7 points, Norway 5, United States 4, Switzerland 3, France 1.
- Stanley Cup playoffs (all series best-of-7; seeds in parentheses):
  - Eastern Conference semifinals:
    - Game four in Boston: (3) Boston Bruins 5, (2) Philadelphia Flyers 1. **Bruins win series 4–0.**
  - Western Conference semifinals:
    - Game four in Detroit: (3) Detroit Red Wings 4, (2) San Jose Sharks 3. Sharks lead series 3–1.

==== Surfing ====
- Women's World Tour:
  - Commonwealth Bank Beachley Classic at Dee Why, Australia: (1) Carissa Moore (USA) (2) Sofía Mulánovich (PER) (3) Sally Fitzgibbons (AUS) & Stephanie Gilmore (AUS)
    - Standings (after 4 of 7 events): (1) Moore 37,000 points (2) Fitzgibbons 33,650 (3) Wright 25,240

==== Taekwondo ====
- World Championships in Gyeongju, South Korea:
  - Men:
    - −63 kg: (gold) Lee Dae-Hoon (KOR) (silver) Michael Harvey (GBR) (bronze) Nacha Punthong (THA) & Le Huynh Chau (VIE)
    - −87 kg: (gold) Yousef Karami (IRI) (silver) Cha Dong-Min (KOR) (bronze) Jon García (ESP) & Carlo Molfetta (ITA)
    - +87 kg: (gold) Jo Chol-Ho (KOR) (silver) Akmal Irgashev (UZB) (bronze) Kourosh Rajoli (IRI) & Andreas Stylianou (CYP)
  - Women:
    - −73 kg: (gold) Gwladys Épangue (FRA) (silver) Oh Hye-Ri (KOR) (bronze) Milica Mandić (SRB) & Anastasia Baryshnikova (RUS)
    - +73 kg: (gold) Anne-Caroline Graffe (FRA) (silver) An Sae-Bom (KOR) (bronze) Rosana Simón (ESP) & Olga Ivanova (RUS)

=== May 5, 2011 (Thursday) ===
==== Cricket ====
- Pakistan in the West Indies:
  - 5th ODI in Providence, Guyana: Pakistan 139 (41.2 overs); West Indies 140/0 (23.3 overs). **West Indies win by 10 wickets; Pakistan win 5-match series 3–2.**

==== Darts ====
- Premier League, week 13 in Bournemouth, England (players in **bold** qualify for the playoffs):
  - Simon Whitlock (AUS) 7–7 Mark Webster (WAL)
  - **Gary Anderson** (SCO) 4–8 **Raymond van Barneveld** (NED)
  - Terry Jenkins (ENG) 3–8 Adrian Lewis (ENG)
  - James Wade (ENG) 4–8 **Phil Taylor** (ENG)
    - Standings (after 13 matches): Taylor 24 points, Anderson, van Barneveld 16, Lewis 13, Whitlock, Wade 11, Jenkins 8, Webster 5.

==== Football (soccer) ====
- UEFA Europa League Semi-finals, second leg (first leg score in parentheses):
  - **Braga** (Portugal) 1–0 (1–2) (Portugal) Benfica. 2–2 on aggregate; Braga win on away goals.
    - Braga reach a European final for the first time.
  - Villarreal (Spain) 3–2 (1–5) (Portugal) **Porto**. Porto win 7–4 on aggregate.
    - Porto reach the final for the second time.
- Copa Libertadores Round of 16, second leg (first leg score in parentheses):
  - Junior (Colombia) 3–3 (1–1) (Mexico) **Chiapas**. 2–2 on points, 4–4 on aggregate; Jaguares win on away goals.
  - **Cerro Porteño** (Paraguay) 0–0 (0–0) (Argentina) Estudiantes. 2–2 on points, 0–0 on aggregate; Cerro Porteño win 5–3 on penalties.
  - LDU Quito (Ecuador) 0–2 (0–3) (Argentina) **Vélez Sarsfield**. Vélez Sarsfield win 6–0 on points.

==== Golf ====
- Senior majors:
  - Regions Tradition in Birmingham, Alabama:
    - Leaderboard after first round (USA unless indicated): (1) Tom Lehman 67 (−5) (T2) Mark Calcavecchia, Wayne Levi, Lu Chien-soon (TWN) & Nick Price (ZWE) 68 (−4)

==== Ice hockey ====
- Men's World Championship in Slovakia:
  - Qualifying round:
    - Group E in Bratislava: Russia 4–3 Denmark
      - Standings: Czech Republic, Germany 6 points (2 games), Russia 6 (3), Finland 3 (2), Slovakia 0 (2), Denmark 0 (3).
    - Group F in Košice: Switzerland 2–3 Norway
      - Standings: Canada 5 points (2 games), Norway 5 (3), Sweden 4 (2), United States 3 (2), Switzerland 3 (3), France 1 (2).
  - Relegation round:
    - Slovenia 5–2 Latvia in Bratislava
    - Belarus 7–2 Austria in Košice
- Stanley Cup playoffs:
  - Western Conference semifinals: (series best-of-7; seeds in parentheses)
    - Game four in Nashville: (1) Vancouver Canucks 4, (5) Nashville Predators 2. Canucks lead series 3–1.

==== Taekwondo ====
- World Championships in Gyeongju, South Korea:
  - Men:
    - −54 kg: (gold) Chutchawal Khawlaor (THA) (silver) Park Ji-woong (KOR) (bronze) Seyfula Magmedov (RUS) & Meisam Bagheri (IRI)
    - −74 kg: (gold) Alireza Nasr Azadani (IRI) (silver) Patiwat Thongsalap (THA) (bronze) Ismaël Coulibaly (MLI) & Rıdvan Baygut (TUR)
  - Women −46 kg: (gold) Kim So-hui (KOR) (silver) Li Zhaoyi (CHN) (bronze) Rukiye Yıldırım (TUR) & Sümeyye Manz (GER)

=== May 4, 2011 (Wednesday) ===
==== Basketball ====
- NBA playoffs (all series best-of-7; seeds in parentheses):
  - Eastern Conference semifinals:
    - Game 2 in Chicago: (1) Chicago Bulls 86, (5) Atlanta Hawks 73. Series tied 1–1.
  - Western Conference semifinals:
    - Game 2 in Los Angeles: (3) Dallas Mavericks 93, (2) Los Angeles Lakers 81. Mavericks lead series 2–0.

==== Football (soccer) ====
- UEFA Champions League Semi-finals, second leg (first leg score in parentheses):
  - **Manchester United** (England) 4–1 (2–0) (Germany) Schalke 04. Manchester United win 6–1 on aggregate.
    - Manchester United reach the final for the third time in four years, and fifth time overall.
- Copa Libertadores Round of 16, second leg (first leg score in parentheses):
  - Cruzeiro (Brazil) 0–2 (2–1) (Colombia) **Once Caldas**. 3–3 on points; Once Caldas win 3–2 on aggregate.
  - **Libertad** (Paraguay) 3–0 (1–3) (Brazil) Fluminense. 3–3 on points; Libertad win 4–3 on aggregate.
  - Internacional (Brazil) 1–2 (1–1) (Uruguay) **Peñarol**. Peñarol win 4–1 on points.
  - **Universidad Católica** (Chile) 1–0 (2–1) (Brazil) Grêmio. Universidad Católica win 6–0 on points.
- AFC Champions League group stage, matchday 5 (teams in **bold** advance to the knockout stage):
  - Group A:
    - **Sepahan** (Iran) 1–1 (Saudi Arabia) Al-Hilal
    - Al-Gharafa (Qatar) 5–2 (United Arab Emirates) Al-Jazira
      - Standings (after 5 matches): Sepahan, Al-Hilal 10 points, Al-Gharafa 7, Al-Jazira 1.
  - Group B: Al-Nassr (Saudi Arabia) 4–0 (Uzbekistan) Pakhtakor
    - Standings (after 5 matches): (Qatar) **Al-Sadd** 9 points, Al-Nassr 8, (Iran) Esteghlal 5, Pakhtakor 4.
  - Group E:
    - Melbourne Victory (Australia) 1–1 (Japan) Gamba Osaka
    - **Tianjin Teda** (China) 3–0 (South Korea) Jeju United
      - Standings (after 5 matches): Tianjin Teda 10 points, Gamba Osaka 7, Jeju United 6, Melbourne Victory 5.
  - Group F:
    - **Nagoya Grampus** (Japan) 1–0 (China) Hangzhou Greentown
    - **FC Seoul** (South Korea) 3–0 (United Arab Emirates) Al-Ain
      - Standings (after 5 matches): Nagoya Grampus, FC Seoul 10 points, Al-Ain, Hangzhou Greentown 4.
- AFC Cup group stage, matchday 5 (teams in **bold** advance to the knockout stage):
  - Group A:
    - Al-Tilal (Yemen) 2–2 (India) Dempo
    - Al-Ansar (Lebanon) 1–4 (Uzbekistan) **Nasaf Qarshi**
      - Standings (after 5 matches): Nasaf Qarshi 15 points, Al-Ansar 6, Dempo, Al-Tilal 4.
  - Group B:
    - Shurtan Guzar (Uzbekistan) 1–1 (Kuwait) **Al-Qadsia**
    - Al-Ittihad (Syria) 2–0 (Yemen) Al-Saqr
      - Standings (after 5 matches): Al-Qadsia 11 points, Al-Ittihad 8, Shurtan Guzar 6, Al-Saqr 1.
  - Group E:
    - **Arbil** (Iraq) 6–2 (Lebanon) Al Ahed
    - Al-Oruba (Oman) 1–1 (Syria) Al-Karamah
      - Standings (after 5 matches): Arbil 11 points, Al-Karamah, Al-Oruba 6, Al Ahed 3.
  - Group F:
    - VB (Maldives) 2–0 (Indonesia) Sriwijaya
    - TSW Pegasus (Hong Kong) 2–3 (Vietnam) Sông Lam Nghệ An
      - Standings (after 5 matches): TSW Pegasus, Sông Lam Nghệ An 9 points, Sriwijaya 7, VB 4.
- (Albania) Superliga, matchday 32 (team in **bold** qualifies for the UEFA Champions League, teams in italics qualify for the UEFA Europa League):
  - **Skënderbeu Korçë** 1–0 KS Elbasani
  - Flamurtari Vlorë – Vllaznia Shkodër — match abandoned after 89 minutes
    - Standings: Skënderbeu Korçë 73 points (32 matches), Flamurtari Vlorë 66 (31), Vllaznia Shkodër 56 (31).
    - Skënderbeu Korçë win the title for the second time and their first since 1933.
- (Canada) Canadian Championship Semifinals, second leg (first leg score in parentheses):
  - **Vancouver Whitecaps** 1–1 (a.e.t.) (1–0) Montreal Impact. Whitecaps win 2–1 on aggregate.
  - **Toronto FC** 1–0 (3–0) FC Edmonton. Toronto FC win 4–0 on aggregate.

==== Ice hockey ====
- Men's World Championship in Slovakia (teams in **bold** advance to the qualifying round):
  - Group C in Košice:
    - Austria 0–5 **Norway**
    - **Sweden** 6–2 **United States**
      - Final standings: Sweden 7 points, United States 6, Norway 5, Austria 0.
  - Group D in Bratislava:
    - **Denmark** 3–2 (SO) Latvia
    - **Finland** 1–2 **Czech Republic**
      - Final standings: Czech Republic 9 points, Finland 5, Denmark, Latvia 2.
- Stanley Cup playoffs (all series best-of-7; seeds in parentheses):
  - Eastern Conference semifinals:
    - Game three in Boston: (3) Boston Bruins 5, (2) Philadelphia Flyers 1. Bruins lead series 3–0.
    - Game four in Tampa: (5) Tampa Bay Lightning 5, (1) Washington Capitals 3. **Lightning win series 4–0.**
  - Western Conference semifinals:
    - Game three in Detroit: (2) San Jose Sharks 4, (3) Detroit Red Wings 3 (OT). Sharks lead series 3–0.

==== Taekwondo ====
- World Championships in Gyeongju, South Korea:
  - Men −68 kg: (gold) Servet Tazegül (TUR) (silver) Mohammad Bagheri Motamed (IRI) (bronze) Rohullah Nikpai (AFG) & Martin Stamper (GBR)
  - Women:
    - –57 kg: (gold) Hou Yuzhuo (CHN) (silver) Jade Jones (GBR) (bronze) Marlène Harnois (FRA) & Lim Su-Jeong (KOR)
    - –62 kg: (gold) Rangsiya Nisaisom (THA) (silver) Marina Sumić (CRO) (bronze) Karine Sergerie (CAN) & Dürdane Altunel (TUR)

=== May 3, 2011 (Tuesday) ===
==== Basketball ====
- NBA playoffs (all series best-of-7; seeds in parentheses):
  - Eastern Conference semifinals:
    - Game 2 in Miami: (2) Miami Heat 102, (3) Boston Celtics 91. Heat lead series 2–0.
  - Western Conference semifinals:
    - Game 2 in Oklahoma City: (4) Oklahoma City Thunder 111, (8) Memphis Grizzlies 102. Series tied 1–1.

==== Football (soccer) ====
- European Under-17 Championship in Serbia:
  - Group A:
    - Serbia 2–3 Denmark
    - France 2–2 England
  - Group B:
    - Germany 0–2 Netherlands
    - Czech Republic 1–1 Romania
- UEFA Champions League Semi-finals, second leg (first leg score in parentheses):
  - **Barcelona** (Spain) 1–1 (2–0) (Spain) Real Madrid. Barcelona win 3–1 on aggregate.
    - Barcelona reach the final for the second time in three years, and the seventh time overall.
- Copa Libertadores Round of 16, second leg (first leg score in parentheses):
  - América (Mexico) 0–0 (0–1) (Brazil) **Santos**. Santos win 4–1 on points.
- AFC Champions League group stage, matchday 5 (teams in **bold** advance to the knockout stage):
  - Group B: **Al-Sadd** (Qatar) 2–2 (Iran) Esteghlal
    - Standings: Al-Sadd 9 points (5 matches), (Saudi Arabia) Al-Nassr 5 (4), Esteghlal 5 (5), (Uzbekistan) Pakhtakor 4 (4).
  - Group C:
    - Persepolis (Iran) 3–2 (Saudi Arabia) **Al-Ittihad**
    - **Bunyodkor** (Uzbekistan) 3–2 (United Arab Emirates) Al-Wahda
      - Standings (after 5 matches): Al-Ittihad 10 points, Bunyodkor 8, Persepolis 5, Al-Wahda 3.
  - Group D:
    - Emirates (United Arab Emirates) 0–1 (Iran) **Zob Ahan**
    - Al-Shabab (Saudi Arabia) 1–0 (Qatar) Al-Rayyan
      - Standings (after 5 matches): Zob Ahan 13 points, Al-Shabab 8, Emirates 6, Al-Rayyan 1.
  - Group G:
    - Arema (Indonesia) 0–4 (Japan) Cerezo Osaka
    - Shandong Luneng (China) 1–2 (South Korea) **Jeonbuk Hyundai Motors**
      - Standings (after 5 matches): Jeonbuk Hyundai Motors 12 points, Cerezo Osaka 9, Shandong Luneng 7, Arema 1.
  - Group H:
    - **Kashima Antlers** (Japan) 2–0 (China) Shanghai Shenhua
    - **Suwon Samsung Bluewings** (South Korea) 3–1 (Australia) Sydney FC
      - Standings (after 5 matches): Suwon Samsung Bluewings, Kashima Antlers 9 points, Sydney FC 5, Shanghai Shenhua 2.
- AFC Cup group stage, matchday 5 (teams in **bold** advance to the knockout stage):
  - Group C:
    - Duhok (Iraq) 1–0 (Kuwait) Al-Nasr
    - Al-Jaish (Syria) 1–1 (Jordan) Al-Faisaly
      - Standings (after 5 matches): Duhok, Al-Faisaly 10 points, Al-Jaish 8, Al-Nasr 0.
  - Group D:
    - **Al-Wehdat** (Jordan) 0–0 (Iraq) Al-Talaba
    - Al-Kuwait 0–0 (Oman) Al-Suwaiq
      - Standings (after 5 matches): Al-Wehdat 13 points, Al-Kuwait 7, Al-Talaba 5, Al-Suwaiq 2.
  - Group G:
    - Hà Nội T&T (Vietnam) 0–0 (Thailand) **Muangthong United**
    - **Tampines Rovers** (Singapore) 4–0 (Maldives) Victory
      - Standings (after 5 matches): Muangthong United, Tampines Rovers 11 points, Hà Nội T&T 5, Victory 0.
  - Group H:
    - **Persipura Jayapura** (Indonesia) 4–2 (Hong Kong) South China
    - **Chonburi** (Thailand) 4–0 (India) Kingfisher East Bengal
      - Standings (after 5 matches): Chonburi, Persipura Jayapura 10 points, South China 5, Kingfisher East Bengal 2.
- (Poland) Polish Cup final in Bydgoszcz: Lech Poznań 1–1 (4–5 pen.) **Legia Warszawa**
  - Legia win the Cup for the 14th time.

==== Ice hockey ====
- Men's World Championship in Slovakia (teams in **bold** advance to the qualifying round):
  - Group A in Bratislava:
    - Slovenia 2–3 (SO) **Germany**
    - **Russia** 4–3 **Slovakia**
      - Final standings: Germany 8 points, Russia 6, Slovakia 3, Slovenia 1.
  - Group B in Košice:
    - **Canada** 4–3 (OT) **Switzerland**
    - **France** 2–1 (OT) Belarus
      - Final standings: Canada 8 points, Switzerland 6, France 3, Belarus 1.
- Stanley Cup playoffs (all series best-of-7; seeds in parentheses):
  - Eastern Conference semifinals:
    - Game three in Tampa: (5) Tampa Bay Lightning 4, (1) Washington Capitals 3. Lightning lead series 3–0.
  - Western Conference semifinals:
    - Game three in Nashville: (1) Vancouver Canucks 3, (5) Nashville Predators 2 (OT). Canucks lead series 2–1.

==== Taekwondo ====
- World Championships in Gyeongju, South Korea:
  - Men −80 kg: (gold) Farzad Abdollahi (IRI) (silver) Yunus Sarı (TUR) (bronze) Issam Chernoubi (MAR) & Ramin Azizov (AZE)
  - Women:
    - –53 kg: (gold) Ana Zaninović (CRO) (silver) Lamyaa Bekkali (MAR) (bronze) Hatice Kübra Yangın (TUR) & Lee Hye-Young (KOR)
    - –67 kg: (gold) Sarah Stevenson (GBR) (silver) Guo Yunfei (CHN) (bronze) Hwang Kyung-Seon (KOR) & Helena Fromm (GER)

=== May 2, 2011 (Monday) ===
==== Auto racing ====
- IndyCar Series:
  - Itaipava São Paulo Indy 300 in São Paulo, Brazil: (1) Will Power (AUS) (Team Penske) (2) Graham Rahal (USA) (Chip Ganassi Racing) (3) Ryan Briscoe (AUS) (Team Penske)
    - Drivers' championship standings (after 4 of 17 races): (1) Power 168 points (2) Dario Franchitti (GBR) (Chip Ganassi Racing) 154 (3) Oriol Servià (ESP) (Newman/Haas Racing) 110

==== Basketball ====
- NBA playoffs (all series best-of-7; seeds in parentheses):
  - Eastern Conference semifinals:
    - Game 1 in Chicago: (5) Atlanta Hawks 103, (1) Chicago Bulls 95. Hawks lead series 1–0.
  - Western Conference semifinals:
    - Game 1 in Los Angeles: (3) Dallas Mavericks 96, (2) Los Angeles Lakers 94. Mavericks lead series 1–0.

==== Cricket ====
- Pakistan in the West Indies:
  - 4th ODI in Bridgetown, Barbados: Pakistan 248/9 (50 overs; Mohammad Hafeez 121); West Indies 154/4 (29.5/39 overs). **West Indies win by 1 run (D/L); Pakistan lead 5-match series 3–1.**

==== Ice hockey ====
- Men's World Championship in Slovakia (teams in **bold** advance to the qualifying round):
  - Group C in Košice:
    - **United States** 4–2 Norway
    - **Sweden** 3–0 Austria
      - Standings (after 2 games): United States 6 points, Sweden 4, Norway 2, Austria 0.
  - Group D in Bratislava:
    - **Czech Republic** 6–0 Denmark
    - Latvia 2–3 (SO) **Finland**
      - Standings (after 2 games): Czech Republic 6 points, Finland 5, Latvia 1, Denmark 0.
- Stanley Cup playoffs:
  - Eastern Conference semifinals: (series best-of-7; seeds in parentheses)
    - Game two in Philadelphia: (3) Boston Bruins 3, (2) Philadelphia Flyers 2 (OT). Bruins lead series 2–0.

==== Snooker ====
- World Championship in Sheffield, England, final:
  - Judd Trump (ENG) 15–18 **John Higgins** (SCO)
    - Higgins becomes the fourth player to win four world titles in the modern era, winning his sixth title of the season and his 24th career ranking title.

==== Taekwondo ====
- World Championships in Gyeongju, South Korea:
  - Men −58 kg: (gold) Joel González (ESP) (silver) Rui Bragança (POR) (bronze) Wei Chen-yang (TPE) & Gabriel Mercedes (DOM)
  - Women −49 kg: (gold) Wu Jingyu (CHN) (silver) Yang Shu-chun (TPE) (bronze) Brigitte Yagüe (ESP) & Sanaa Atabrour (MAR)

=== May 1, 2011 (Sunday) ===
==== Auto racing ====
- IndyCar Series:
  - Itaipava São Paulo Indy 300 in São Paulo, Brazil: Due to persistent rain, the race was called for the day after 14 of the scheduled 75 laps, and will resume on May 2.
- V8 Supercars:
  - Trading Post Perth Challenge in Perth, Western Australia:
    - Race 8: (1) Jason Bright (AUS) (Brad Jones Racing, Holden VE Commodore) (2) Jamie Whincup (AUS) (Triple Eight Race Engineering, Holden VE Commodore) (3) Jason Bargwanna (AUS) (Brad Jones Racing, Holden VE Commodore)
      - During the start of the race, there was a violent impact between Karl Reindler (AUS) (Britek Motorsport, Holden VE Commodore) and Steve Owen (AUS) (Paul Morris Motorsport, Holden VE Commodore) after Reindler stalled his #21 VE Commodore on the grid and Owen then collided with the back of Reindler's car at approximately 150 km/h, splitting the fuel cell and igniting a fireball which left Reindler with minor burns to his hands and face; Owen escaped unharmed. The race was subsequently red-flagged while cleanup began.
    - Race 9: (1) Whincup (2) Bright (3) Garth Tander (AUS) (Holden Racing Team, Holden VE Commodore)
      - Drivers' championship standings (after 9 of 27 races): (1) Whincup 946 points (2) Craig Lowndes (AUS) (Triple Eight Race Engineering, Holden VE Commodore) 804 (3) Tander 737

==== Badminton ====
- BWF Super Series:
  - India Super Series in New Delhi:
    - Men's singles: **Lee Chong Wei** (MAS) def. Peter Gade (DEN) 21–12, 12–21, 21–15
    - Women's singles: **Porntip Buranaprasertsuk** (THA) def. Bae Yeon-ju (KOR) 21–13. 21–16
    - Men's doubles: **Hirokatsu Hashimoto** (JPN)/**Noriyasu Hirata** (JPN) def. Angga Pratama (IDN)/Rian Agung Saputro (IDN) 21–17, 21–9
    - Women's doubles: **Miyuki Maeda** (JPN)/**Satoko Suetsuna** (JPN) def. Mizuki Fujii (JPN)/Reika Kakiiwa (JPN) 26–24, 21–15
    - Mixed doubles: **Tontowi Ahmad** (IDN)/**Liliyana Natsir** (IDN) def. Fran Kurniawan (IDN)/Pia Zebadiah Bernadet (IDN) 21–18, 23–21

==== Basketball ====
- EuroChallenge Final Four in Ostend, Belgium:
  - Third place: Spartak Saint Petersburg (Russia) 92–94 (Belgium) (bronze) **Telenet Oostende** (OT)
  - Championship: (silver) Lokomotiv–Kuban Krasnodar (Russia) 77–83 (Slovenia) (gold) **Krka Novo Mesto**
    - Krka become the first Slovenian team to win the EuroChallenge.
- NBA playoffs (all series best-of-7; seeds in parentheses):
  - Eastern Conference semifinals:
    - Game 1 in Miami: (2) Miami Heat 99, (3) Boston Celtics 90. Heat lead series 1–0.
  - Western Conference semifinals:
    - Game 1 in Oklahoma City: (8) Memphis Grizzlies 114, (4) Oklahoma City Thunder 101. Grizzlies lead series 1–0.

==== Cycling ====
- UCI World Tour:
  - Tour de Romandie, stage 5: (gold) Ben Swift (GBR) (Team Sky) 3h 50' 51" (silver) Davide Viganò (ITA) (Leopard Trek) s.t. (bronze) Óscar Freire (ESP) (Rabobank) s.t.
    - Final general classification: (1) Cadel Evans (AUS) (BMC Racing Team) 16h 51' 49" (2) Tony Martin (GER) (HTC–Highroad) + 18" (3) Alexander Vinokourov (KAZ) (Astana) + 19"
    - World Tour standings (after 13 of 27 races): (1) Philippe Gilbert (BEL) (Omega Pharma–Lotto) 356 points (2) Fabian Cancellara (SUI) (Leopard Trek) 236 (3) Evans 232

==== Equestrianism ====
- FEI World Cup finals in Leipzig, Germany:
  - Show jumping final: Christian Ahlmann (GER) on Taloubet Z (silver) Eric Lamaze (CAN) on Hickstead (bronze) Jeroen Dubbeldam (NED) on Simon
  - Four-in-hand driving Final: (gold) Boyd Exell (AUS) (silver) József Dobrovitz (HUN) (bronze) IJsbrand Chardon (NED)
- Rolex Kentucky Three Day Eventing in Lexington, Kentucky, USA (CCI 4*): (gold) Mary King (GBR) on Kings Temptress (silver) Mary King on Fernhill Urco (bronze) Sinead Halpin (USA) on Manoir de Carneville

==== Football (soccer) ====
- African Youth Championship in South Africa:
  - Third place playoff: Mali 0–1 (bronze) **Egypt**
  - Final: (silver) Cameroon 2–3 (a.e.t.) (gold) **Nigeria**
    - Nigeria win the title for the sixth time.
- (Azerbaijan) Premier League, matchday 29 (team in **bold** qualifies for the UEFA Champions League, team in italics qualifies for the UEFA Europa League):
  - Qarabağ 2–2 Baku
  - AZAL 1–3 **Neftchi Baku**
    - Standings: Neftchi Baku 65 points, Khazar Lankaran 55, Qarabağ 54.
    - Neftchi win the title for the sixth time and their first since 2004–05.

==== Golf ====
- PGA Tour:
  - Zurich Classic of New Orleans in Avondale, Louisiana:
    - Winner: Bubba Watson (USA) 273 (−15)^{PO}
      - Watson defeats Webb Simpson (USA) on the second playoff hole to win his third PGA Tour title.
- European Tour:
  - Ballantine's Championship in Jeju, South Korea:
    - Winner: Lee Westwood (ENG) 276 (−12)
      - The current World #1 wins his 21st European Tour title and first since 2009.
- LPGA Tour:
  - Avnet LPGA Classic in Mobile, Alabama:
    - Winner: Maria Hjorth (SWE) 278 (−10)
      - Hjorth wins her fifth career LPGA Tour title.

==== Ice hockey ====
- Men's World Championship in Slovakia (teams in **bold** advance to the qualifying round):
  - Group A in Bratislava:
    - **Russia** 6–4 Slovenia
    - **Slovakia** 3–4 **Germany**
      - Standings (after 2 games): Germany 6 points, Slovakia, Russia 3, Slovenia 0.
  - Group B in Košice:
    - **Canada** 9–1 France
    - **Switzerland** 4–1 Belarus
      - Standings (after 2 games): Canada 6 points, Switzerland 5, France 1, Belarus 0.
- Stanley Cup playoffs (all series best-of-7; seeds in parentheses):
  - Eastern Conference semifinals:
    - Game two in Washington: (5) Tampa Bay Lightning 3, (1) Washington Capitals 2 (OT). Lightning lead series 2–0.
  - Western Conference semifinals:
    - Game two in San Jose: (2) San Jose Sharks 2, (3) Detroit Red Wings 1. Sharks lead series 2–0.

==== Motorcycle racing ====
- Moto GP:
  - Portuguese Grand Prix in Estoril, Portugal:
    - MotoGP: (1) Dani Pedrosa (ESP) (Honda) (2) Jorge Lorenzo (ESP) (Yamaha) (3) Casey Stoner (AUS) (Honda)
      - Riders' championship standings (after 3 of 18 races): (1) Lorenzo 65 points (2) Pedrosa 61 (3) Stoner 41
    - Moto2: (1) Stefan Bradl (GER) (Kalex) (2) Julián Simón (ESP) (Suter) (3) Yuki Takahashi (JPN) (Moriwaki)
      - Riders' championship standings (after 3 of 17 races): (1) Bradl 61 points (2) Andrea Iannone (ITA) (Suter) 48 (3) Simone Corsi (ITA) (FTR) 37
    - 125cc: (1) Nicolás Terol (ESP) (Aprilia) (2) Sandro Cortese (GER) (Aprilia) (3) Johann Zarco (FRA) (Derbi)
      - Riders' championship standings (after 3 of 17 races): (1) Terol 75 points (2) Cortese 50 (3) Jonas Folger (GER) (Aprilia) & Zarco 42

==== Rugby union ====
- Heineken Cup semi-finals:
  - **Northampton Saints** (England) 23–7 (France) Perpignan in Milton Keynes

==== Snooker ====
- World Championship in Sheffield, England, final:
  - Judd Trump (ENG) 10–7 John Higgins (SCO)

==== Surfing ====
- Women's World Tour:
  - Subaru Pro TSB Bank Women's Surf Festival at Taranaki, New Zealand: (1) Sally Fitzgibbons (AUS) (2) Carissa Moore (USA) (3) Coco Ho (USA) & Tyler Wright (AUS)
    - Standings (after 3 of 7 events): (1) Fitzgibbons 26,500 points (2) Moore 26,000 (3) Wright 19,700

==== Tennis ====
- ATP World Tour:
  - BMW Open in Munich, Germany:
    - Final: **Nikolay Davydenko** (RUS) def. Florian Mayer (GER) 6–3, 3–6, 6–1
      - Davydenko wins the tournament for the second time, for the 21st title of his career.
  - Serbia Open in Belgrade, Serbia:
    - Final: **Novak Djokovic** (SRB) def. Feliciano López (ESP) 7–6(4), 6–2
      - The tournament host wins his second Serbia Open title, fifth title of the season, and 23rd of his career. He also extends his season match record to 27–0.
  - Estoril Open in Estoril, Portugal:
    - Final: **Juan Martín del Potro** (ARG) def. Fernando Verdasco (ESP) 6–2, 6–2
      - Del Potro wins his second title of the season, and the ninth of his career.
