= List of teams and cyclists in the 2011 Giro d'Italia =

All 18 UCI ProTeams are invited automatically and obligated to attend, with nine cyclists per team. Two UCI Professional Continental were announced well ahead of time, Androni Giocattoli and Farnese Vini–Neri Sottoli. UCI rules normally limit races to a peloton of 200 riders, but the Giro received special dispensation for a 207-rider peloton, allowing a 23rd team. The three additional invited teams are Acqua & Sapone, Colnago–CSF Inox, and Geox–TMC. Despite talk that ProTeam Vacansoleil–DCM might be excluded to the doping scandals involving team members Riccardo Riccò and Ezequiel Mosquera, they were included pursuant to UCI rules.

The cyclists wore numbers from 1 to 229; the first team had numbers 1 to 9, the second team 11 to 19, etc. The exception to this rule was the Farnese Vini–Neri Sottoli, who wore numbers 150 to 158 instead of 151 to 159, thus giving Italian champion Giovanni Visconti the number 150, as in 2011 it is 150 years after Italy was unified in the Kingdom of Italy.

== By rider ==
Legend
No.	Starting number worn by the rider during the Giro
Pos.	Position in the general classification
†	Denotes riders born on or after 1 January 1986 eligible for the Young rider classification
A pink jersey	Denotes the winner of the General classification
A red jersey	Denotes the winner of the Points classification
A green jersey	Denotes the winner of the Mountains classification
A white jersey	Denotes the winner of the Young rider classification (eligibility indicated by †)
DNS	Denotes a rider who did not start, followed by the stage before which he withdrew
DNF	Denotes a rider who did not finish, followed by the stage in which he withdrew
HD	Denotes a rider who failed to finish within the time limit, followed by the stage in which this occurred
Age correct as of 7 May 2011, the date on which the Giro began

No.	Rider	Nationality	Team	Age	Pos.
1	Stefano Garzelli	Italy	Acqua & Sapone	37	26
2	Massimo Codol	Italy	Acqua & Sapone	38	32
3	Claudio Corioni	Italy	Acqua & Sapone	28	150
4	Carlos Betancur	Colombia	Acqua & Sapone	21^{†}	59
5	Ruggero Marzoli	Italy	Acqua & Sapone	35	118
6	Vladimir Miholjević	Croatia	Acqua & Sapone	37	31
7	Danilo Napolitano	Italy	Acqua & Sapone	30	DNF-11
8	Cayetano Sarmiento	Colombia	Acqua & Sapone	24^{†}	33
9	Fabio Taborre	Italy	Acqua & Sapone	25	98
11	Rinaldo Nocentini	Italy	Ag2r–La Mondiale	33	70
12	Julien Bérard	France	Ag2r–La Mondiale	23^{†}	132
13	Mikaël Cherel	France	Ag2r–La Mondiale	25^{†}	62
14	Cyril Dessel	France	Ag2r–La Mondiale	36	99
15	Hubert Dupont	France	Ag2r–La Mondiale	30	12
16	John Gadret	France	Ag2r–La Mondiale	32	4
17	Ben Gastauer	Luxembourg	Ag2r–La Mondiale	23^{†}	88
18	Yuriy Krivtsov	France	Ag2r–La Mondiale	32	119
19	Matteo Montaguti	Italy	Ag2r–La Mondiale	27	77
21	José Serpa	Colombia	Androni Giocattoli	32	52
22	Emanuele Sella	Italy	Androni Giocattoli	30	35
23	José Rujano	Venezuela	Androni Giocattoli	29	7
24	Alessandro De Marchi	Italy	Androni Giocattoli	24^{†}	109
25	Giairo Ermeti	Italy	Androni Giocattoli	30	104
26	Roberto Ferrari	Italy	Androni Giocattoli	28	143
27	Carlos José Ochoa	Venezuela	Androni Giocattoli	30	65
28	Jackson Rodríguez	Venezuela	Androni Giocattoli	26	DNF-9
29	Ángel Vicioso	Spain	Androni Giocattoli	34	71
31	Chris Barton	United States	BMC Racing Team	22^{†}	DNF-5
32	Chad Beyer	United States	BMC Racing Team	24^{†}	152
33	Mathias Frank	Switzerland	BMC Racing Team	24^{†}	85
34	Martin Kohler	Switzerland	BMC Racing Team	25	DNF-13
35	Alexander Kristoff	Norway	BMC Racing Team	23^{†}	157
36	Chris Butler	United States	BMC Racing Team	23^{†}	DNS-9
37	Johann Tschopp	Switzerland	BMC Racing Team	28	16
38	Danilo Wyss	Switzerland	BMC Racing Team	25	126
39	Simon Zahner	Switzerland	BMC Racing Team	28	131
41	Domenico Pozzovivo	Italy	Colnago–CSF Inox	28	DNF-15
42	Manuel Belletti	Italy	Colnago–CSF Inox	25	DNS-13
43	Sacha Modolo	Italy	Colnago–CSF Inox	23^{†}	DNF-13
44	Stefano Pirazzi	Italy	Colnago–CSF Inox	24^{†}	61
45	Filippo Savini	Italy	Colnago–CSF Inox	26	DNF-19
46	Federico Canuti	Italy	Colnago–CSF Inox	25	94
47	Simone Stortoni	Italy	Colnago–CSF Inox	25	80
48	Gianluca Brambilla	Italy	Colnago–CSF Inox	23^{†}	95
49	Marco Frapporti	Italy	Colnago–CSF Inox	26	132
51	Igor Antón	Spain	Euskaltel–Euskadi	28	18
52	Daniel Sesma	Spain	Euskaltel–Euskadi	26	149
53	Miguel Minguez	Spain	Euskaltel–Euskadi	22^{†}	135
54	Iñaki Isasi	Spain	Euskaltel–Euskadi	34	63
55	Pierre Cazaux	France	Euskaltel–Euskadi	26	124
56	Javier Aramendia	Spain	Euskaltel–Euskadi	24^{†}	115
57	Jorge Azanza	Spain	Euskaltel–Euskadi	28	68
58	Juan José Oroz	Spain	Euskaltel–Euskadi	30	DNF-15
59	Mikel Nieve	Spain	Euskaltel–Euskadi	26	11
61	Denis Menchov	Russia	Geox–TMC	33	8
62	Carlos Sastre	Spain	Geox–TMC	36	30
63	Marcel Wyss	Switzerland	Geox–TMC	24^{†}	34
64	David Blanco	Spain	Geox–TMC	36	66
65	Giampaolo Cheula	Italy	Geox–TMC	31	97
66	Dmitry Kozonchuk	Russia	Geox–TMC	27	75
67	Fabio Duarte	Colombia	Geox–TMC	24^{†}	DNF-8
68	Mauricio Ardila	Colombia	Geox–TMC	31	122
69	Rafael Valls	Spain	Geox–TMC	23^{†}	DNF-14
71	Mark Cavendish	Great Britain	HTC–Highroad	25	DNS-13
72	Marco Pinotti	Italy	HTC–Highroad	35	DNF-19
73	Patrick Gretsch	Germany	HTC–Highroad	24^{†}	138
74	Craig Lewis	United States	HTC–Highroad	26	DNF-19
75	Lars Bak	Denmark	HTC–Highroad	31	127
76	František Raboň	Czech Republic	HTC–Highroad	27	DNF-15
77	Alex Rasmussen	Denmark	HTC–Highroad	26	154
78	Mark Renshaw	Australia	HTC–Highroad	28	DNS-13
79	Kanstantsin Sivtsov	Belarus	HTC–Highroad	28	10
81	Joaquim Rodríguez	Spain	Team Katusha	31	5
82	Danilo Di Luca	Italy	Team Katusha	35	69
83	Pavel Brutt	Russia	Team Katusha	29	128
84	Giampaolo Caruso	Italy	Team Katusha	30	42
85	Daniel Moreno	Spain	Team Katusha	29	29
86	Eduard Vorganov	Russia	Team Katusha	28	37
87	Alberto Losada	Spain	Team Katusha	29	55
88	Joan Horrach	Spain	Team Katusha	37	53
89	Aleksandr Kuschynski	Belarus	Team Katusha	31	90
91	Michele Scarponi	Italy	Lampre–ISD	31	2
92	Alessandro Petacchi	Italy	Lampre–ISD	37	DNS-13
93	Marco Marzano	Italy	Lampre–ISD	30	DNF-15
94	Diego Ulissi	Italy	Lampre–ISD	21^{†}	41
95	Danilo Hondo	Germany	Lampre–ISD	37	DNS-13
96	Przemysław Niemiec	Poland	Lampre–ISD	31	40
97	Alessandro Spezialetti	Italy	Lampre–ISD	36	107
98	Daniele Righi	Italy	Lampre–ISD	35	125
99	Simon Špilak	Slovenia	Lampre–ISD	24^{†}	117
101	Brice Feillu	France	Leopard Trek	25	DNS-5
102	Dominic Klemme	Germany	Leopard Trek	24^{†}	DNS-5
103	Thomas Rohregger	Austria	Leopard Trek	28	DNS-5
104	Tom Stamsnijder	Netherlands	Leopard Trek	25	DNS-5
105	Bruno Pires	Portugal	Leopard Trek	29	DNS-5
106	Davide Viganò	Italy	Leopard Trek	26	DNS-5
107	Fabian Wegmann	Germany	Leopard Trek	30	DNS-5
108	Wouter Weylandt	Belgium	Leopard Trek	26	†-3^{‡}
109	Oliver Zaugg	Switzerland	Leopard Trek	29	DNS-5
111	Vincenzo Nibali	Italy	Liquigas–Cannondale	26	3
112	Valerio Agnoli	Italy	Liquigas–Cannondale	26	83
113	Eros Capecchi	Italy	Liquigas–Cannondale	24^{†}	60
114	Alan Marangoni	Italy	Liquigas–Cannondale	26	142
115	Tiziano Dall'Antonia	Italy	Liquigas–Cannondale	27	139
116	Fabio Sabatini	Italy	Liquigas–Cannondale	26	104
117	Cristiano Salerno	Italy	Liquigas–Cannondale	26	57
118	Sylwester Szmyd	Poland	Liquigas–Cannondale	33	82
119	Alessandro Vanotti	Italy	Liquigas–Cannondale	30	73
121	David Arroyo	Spain	Movistar Team	31	14
122	Vasil Kiryienka	Belarus	Movistar Team	29	25
122	Ignatas Konovalovas	Lithuania	Movistar Team	25	102
124	Carlos Oyarzún	Chile	Movistar Team	24^{†}	112
125	Pablo Lastras	Spain	Movistar Team	35	38
126	Sergio Pardilla	Spain	Movistar Team	27	48
127	Luis Pasamontes	Spain	Movistar Team	31	51
128	Branislau Samoilau	Belarus	Movistar Team	25	46
129	Francisco Ventoso	Spain	Movistar Team	28	DNS-13
131	Jan Bakelants	Belgium	Omega Pharma–Lotto	25^{†}	23
132	Adam Blythe	Great Britain	Omega Pharma–Lotto	21^{†}	DNF-10
133	Francis De Greef	Belgium	Omega Pharma–Lotto	26	24
134	Bart De Clercq	Belgium	Omega Pharma–Lotto	24^{†}	27
135	Gert Dockx	Belgium	Omega Pharma–Lotto	22^{†}	96
136	Olivier Kaisen	Belgium	Omega Pharma–Lotto	28	141
137	Sebastian Lang	Germany	Omega Pharma–Lotto	31	56
138	Jussi Veikkanen	Finland	Omega Pharma–Lotto	30	120
139	Klaas Lodewyck	Belgium	Omega Pharma–Lotto	23^{†}	147
141	Roman Kreuziger	Czech Republic	Astana	24^{†}	6
142	Paolo Tiralongo	Italy	Astana	33	19
143	Francesco Masciarelli	Italy	Astana	24^{†}	DNS-17
144	Robert Kišerlovski	Croatia	Astana	24^{†}	43
145	Maxim Gourov	Kazakhstan	Astana	32	151
146	Josep Jufré	Spain	Astana	35	74
147	Alexsandr Dyachenko	Kazakhstan	Astana	27	111
148	Evgeni Petrov	Russia	Astana	32	39
149	Gorazd Štangelj	Slovenia	Astana	38	86
150	Giovanni Visconti	Italy	Farnese Vini–Neri Sottoli	28	49
151	Francesco Failli	Italy	Farnese Vini–Neri Sottoli	27	DNF-5
152	Leonardo Giordani	Italy	Farnese Vini–Neri Sottoli	33	114
153	Oscar Gatto	Italy	Farnese Vini–Neri Sottoli	26	105
154	Matteo Rabottini	Italy	Farnese Vini–Neri Sottoli	23^{†}	113
155	Luca Mazzanti	Italy	Farnese Vini–Neri Sottoli	37	103
156	Elia Favilli	Italy	Farnese Vini–Neri Sottoli	22^{†}	158
157	Andrea Noè	Italy	Farnese Vini–Neri Sottoli	42	DNF-14
158	Davide Ricci Bitti	Italy	Farnese Vini–Neri Sottoli	27	148
161	Francesco Chicchi	Italy	Quick-Step	30	DNF-14
162	Dario Cataldo	Italy	Quick-Step	26	13
163	Gerald Ciolek	Germany	Quick-Step	24^{†}	DNF-13
164	Francesco Reda	Italy	Quick-Step	28	134
165	Addy Engels	Netherlands	Quick-Step	33	110
166	Davide Malacarne	Italy	Quick-Step	23^{†}	146
167	Jérôme Pineau	France	Quick-Step	31	84
168	Kevin Seeldraeyers	Belgium	Quick-Step	24^{†}	50
169	Kristof Vandewalle	Belgium	Quick-Step	26	93
171	Graeme Brown	Australia	Rabobank	32	HD-9
172	Rick Flens	Netherlands	Rabobank	28	155
173	Steven Kruijswijk	Netherlands	Rabobank	23^{†}	9
174	Stef Clement	Netherlands	Rabobank	28	108
175	Tom-Jelte Slagter	Netherlands	Rabobank	21^{†}	DNF-5
176	Bram Tankink	Netherlands	Rabobank	32	36
177	Jos van Emden	Netherlands	Rabobank	23^{†}	159
178	Dennis van Winden	Netherlands	Rabobank	23^{†}	121
179	Pieter Weening	Netherlands	Rabobank	30	45
181	Alberto Contador	Spain	Saxo Bank–SunGard	28	1
182	Laurent Didier	Luxembourg	Saxo Bank–SunGard	26	130
183	Volodymir Gustov	Ukraine	Saxo Bank–SunGard	34	72
184	Jesús Hernández	Spain	Saxo Bank–SunGard	29	28
185	Kasper Klostergaard	Denmark	Saxo Bank–SunGard	27	153
186	Richie Porte	Australia	Saxo Bank–SunGard	26	81
187	Daniel Navarro	Spain	Saxo Bank–SunGard	27	44
188	Matteo Tosatto	Italy	Saxo Bank–SunGard	36	136
189	Michael Mørkøv	Denmark	Saxo Bank–SunGard	26	156
191	Thomas Löfkvist	Sweden	Team Sky	27	21
192	Michael Barry	Canada	Team Sky	35	54
193	Kjell Carlström	Finland	Team Sky	34	133
194	Dario Cioni	Italy	Team Sky	36	76
195	Russell Downing	Great Britain	Team Sky	32	140
196	Davide Appollonio	Italy	Team Sky	21^{†}	DNF-13
197	Lars Petter Nordhaug	Norway	Team Sky	26	92
198	Peter Kennaugh	Great Britain	Team Sky	21^{†}	87
199	Morris Possoni	Italy	Team Sky	26	79
201	Tyler Farrar	United States	Garmin–Cervélo	26	DNS-5
202	Brett Lancaster	Australia	Garmin–Cervélo	31	DNF-15
203	Thomas Peterson	United States	Garmin–Cervélo	24^{†}	89
204	Murilo Fischer	Brazil	Garmin–Cervélo	31	DNF-17
205	Christophe Le Mével	France	Garmin–Cervélo	30	15
206	Cameron Meyer	Australia	Garmin–Cervélo	23^{†}	137
207	David Millar	Great Britain	Garmin–Cervélo	34	100
208	Peter Stetina	United States	Garmin–Cervélo	23^{†}	22
209	Matt Wilson	Australia	Garmin–Cervélo	33	DNF-17
211	Tiago Machado	Portugal	Team RadioShack	25	20
212	Yaroslav Popovych	Ukraine	Team RadioShack	31	64
213	Robbie McEwen	Australia	Team RadioShack	38	HD-9
214	Fumiyuki Beppu	Japan	Team RadioShack	28	67
215	Manuel Cardoso	Portugal	Team RadioShack	28	DNF-15
216	Philip Deignan	Ireland	Team RadioShack	27	47
217	Robert Hunter	South Africa	Team RadioShack	34	DNS-15
218	Ivan Rovny	Russia	Team RadioShack	23^{†}	78
219	Bjørn Selander	United States	Team RadioShack	23^{†}	129
221	Matteo Carrara	Italy	Vacansoleil–DCM	32	17
222	Borut Božič	Slovenia	Vacansoleil–DCM	30	DNF-11
223	Maxim Belkov	Russia	Vacansoleil–DCM	26	101
224	Michał Gołaś	Poland	Vacansoleil–DCM	27	DNS-16
225	Johnny Hoogerland	Netherlands	Vacansoleil–DCM	27	58
226	Sergey Lagutin	Uzbekistan	Vacansoleil–DCM	30	91
227	Alberto Ongarato	Italy	Vacansoleil–DCM	35	145
228	Mirko Selvaggi	Italy	Vacansoleil–DCM	26	116
229	Frederik Veuchelen	Belgium	Vacansoleil–DCM	32	106

‡ Died as a result of a collision

== By nationality ==
Country	No. of riders	Finishers	Stage wins
Italy	62	51	5 (Alessandro Petacchi, Oscar Gatto, Diego Ulissi, Eros Capecchi, Paolo Tiralongo)
Spain	25	23	6 (Ángel Vicioso, Francisco Ventoso, Alberto Contador x2, Igor Antón, Mikel Nieve)
Netherlands	11	9	1 (Pieter Weening)
Belgium	10	9	1 (Bart De Clercq)
France	10	9	1 (John Gadret)
United States	8	6	0
Australia	7	3	0
Russia	7	7	0
Switzerland	7	5	0
Germany	6	2	0
Colombia	5	4	0
Great Britain	5	3	3 (Mark Cavendish x2, David Millar)
Belarus	4	4	1 (Vasil Kiryienka)
Denmark	4	4	0
Poland	3	3	0
Portugal	3	1	0
Slovenia	3	2	0
Venezuela	3	2	1 (José Rujano)
Croatia	2	2	0
Czech Republic	2	1	0
Finland	2	2	0
Kazakhstan	2	2	0
Luxembourg	2	2	0
Norway	2	2	0
Ukraine	2	2	0
Austria	1	0	0
Brazil	1	1	0
Canada	1	1	0
Chile	1	1	0
Ireland	1	1	0
Japan	1	1	0
Lithuania	1	1	0
South Africa	1	0	0
Sweden	1	1	0
Uzbekistan	1	1	0
TOTAL'	207	166	19
