= 2011 Giro d'Italia, Stage 1 to Stage 11 =

Cycling race stages

Overview of the stages; purple lines represent distances covered in the individual stages, while black dotted lines are the distances covered in transfers between the stages

The 2011 Giro d'Italia began on 7 May, and stage 11 occurred on 18 May. The 2011 edition commemorated the 150th anniversary of Italian unification. The majority of the race, and the entire first half, was situated entirely within Italy without visiting any other nations. The race commenced with a team time trial, an event where each member of a team starts together racing against the clock. The stage provided for the first two race leaders, members of the winning HTC–Highroad team.

The race, and the entire cycling world, were turned upside down by the death of Leopard Trek rider Wouter Weylandt in stage 3. Weylandt had crashed from near the back of the race while descending a hill, and sustained such grievous injury that he was established to have died instantly upon falling to the road. The next day's stage was neutralized, as the peloton rode slowly and allowed Weylandt's teammates, as well as his good friend and training partner Tyler Farrar from the Garmin–Cervélo squad, to cross the line first with their arms around one another. All of them subsequently withdrew from the Giro.

Dutch rider Pieter Weening won the first stage competitively raced after Weylandt's death, and took over the race leadership for four days. He surrendered it to another stage winner, strong overall favorite Alberto Contador who dominated the field on the way up Mount Etna. Although it was perhaps against his will, Contador continued to hold the race leadership through the end of the first half of the race, topping the overall standings with the much more difficult second half of the Giro still to race.

Legend
A pink jersey	Denotes the leader of the General classification	A green jersey	Denotes the leader of the Mountains classification
A red jersey	Denotes the leader of the Points classification	A white jersey	Denotes the leader of the Young rider classification
	s.t. indicates that the rider crossed the finish line in the same group as the one receiving the time above him, and was therefore credited with the same finishing time.		

== Stage 1 ==
7 May 2011 – Venaria Reale to Turin, 19.3 km (12.0 mi) (team time trial)

The Giro begins with a team time trial, a favored event of race director Angelo Zomegnan who has included such a stage in every Giro since he first assumed that mantle. The course is flat, but is also technical, with several sharp turns, and it also covers tram tracks. Pre-race analysis found it comparable to the equivalent stage in Venice which began the 2009 Giro. The HTC–Highroad team, known at that time as Team Columbia–High Road, are again favorites, along with several other teams. While the Giro itself commemorates the anniversary of Italian unification, so too does the first stage in particular, by visiting Italy's first capital of Turin.

The Omega Pharma–Lotto team was the first on the course, and stopped the clock in 21'21", which held up as a competitive time for the rest of the stage. Nearly every squad came within a second, on either side, of matching their time of ten minutes flat at the 9 km (5.6 mi) intermediate time check. The one which was notably faster was HTC–Highroad, who were at 9'48" after 9 km. They were the only squad to finish in under 21 minutes, winning the stage with a time of 20'59". Team time trial winners from the 2010 Giro Liquigas–Cannondale opted to ride somewhat conservatively, particularly over the tram tracks, knowing that with less than 20 km of racing that resultant time gaps would not be excessive. Their leader Vincenzo Nibali effectively gained eight seconds on Giro favorite Alberto Contador with Saxo Bank–SunGard finishing eighth to Liquigas-Cannondale's fourth. Michele Scarponi also gained time on Contador, with the Lampre–ISD six seconds better than Contador's squad. The most notable time loss on the day however was suffered by Joaquim Rodríguez, with his Team Katusha squad finishing a distant 20th, over a minute off HTC-Highroad's winning time. Marco Pinotti was the first HTC-Highroad rider over the finish line, giving him the first pink jersey. He had previously held the jersey for four days in the 2007 Giro, but he made it clear after the stage that he would work for Mark Cavendish in the first road race stage and could possibly cede the jersey to the Manxman.

Stage 1 result

	Team	Time
1	HTC–Highroad	20' 59"
2	Team RadioShack	+ 10"
3	Liquigas–Cannondale	+ 22"
4	Omega Pharma–Lotto	+ 22"
5	Garmin–Cervélo	+ 24"
6	Lampre–ISD	+ 24"
7	Rabobank	+ 26"
8	Saxo Bank–SunGard	+ 30"
9	Team Sky	+ 37"
10	Vacansoleil–DCM	+ 37"

General classification after stage 1

	Rider	Team	Time
1	Marco Pinotti (ITA)	HTC–Highroad	20' 59"
2	Lars Bak (DEN)	HTC–Highroad	+ 0"
3	Kanstantsin Sivtsov (BLR)	HTC–Highroad	+ 0"
4	Mark Cavendish (GBR)	HTC–Highroad	+ 0"
5	Craig Lewis (USA)	HTC–Highroad	+ 0"
6	Robbie McEwen (AUS)	Team RadioShack	+ 10"
7	Tiago Machado (POR)	Team RadioShack	+ 10"
8	Fumiyuki Beppu (JPN)	Team RadioShack	+ 10"
9	Bjørn Selander (USA)	Team RadioShack	+ 10"
10	Robert Hunter (RSA)	Team RadioShack	+ 10"

== Stage 2 ==
8 May 2011 – Alba to Parma, 244 km (152 mi)

This stage was flat, and one of few stages intended to end in a mass sprint. It took place on National Bicycle Day in Italy, the second time such an occasion was observed. A very short fourth-category climb occurred 30 km (19 mi) from the finish line, to award the first green jersey. The arrival town of Parma hosted the Giro on eight other occasions, and was chosen for National Bicycle Day due to the vast quantities of bike trails it has.

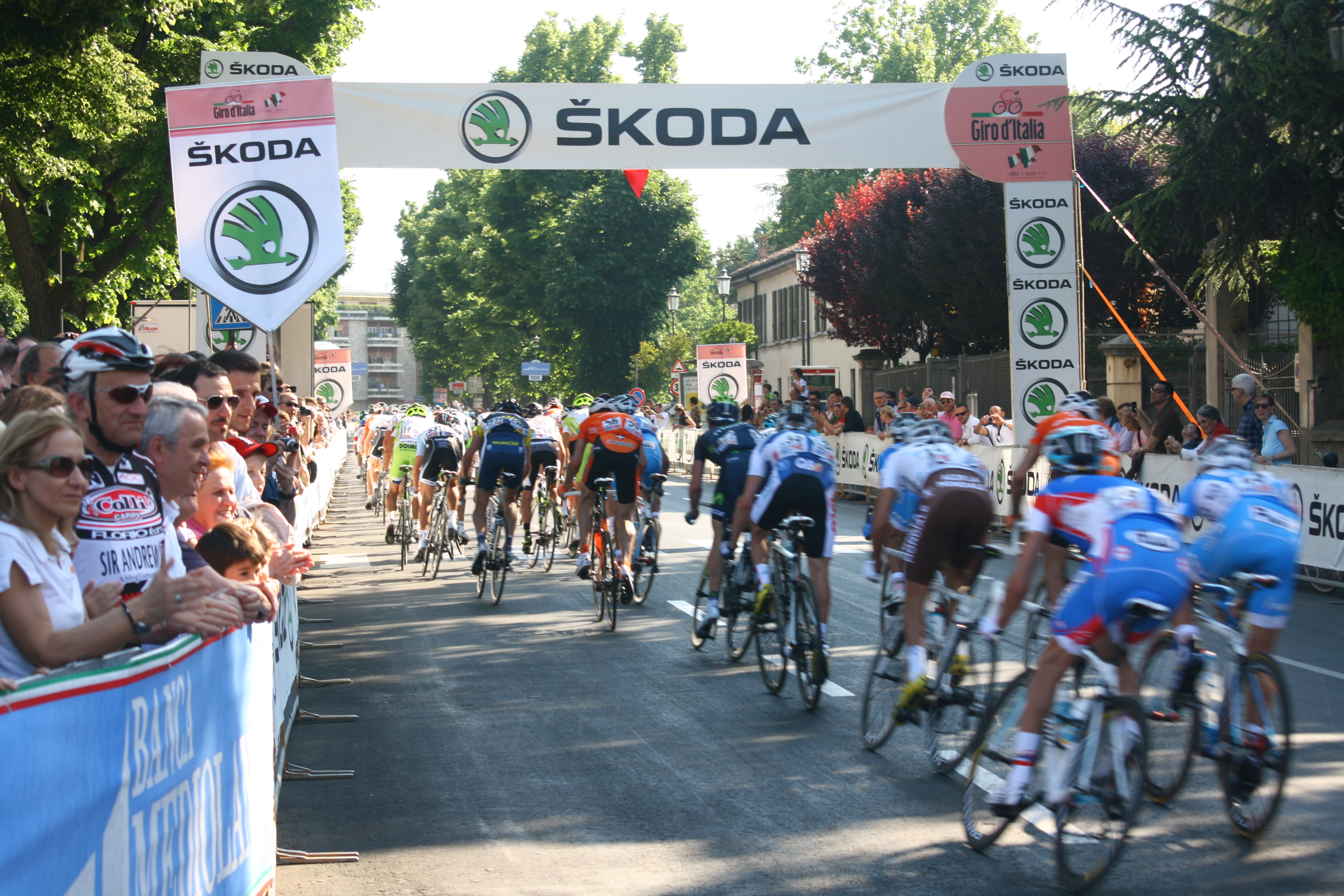
The peloton nearing the finish of stage 2 in Parma.

A singular rider formed the day's breakaway. Sebastian Lang of Omega Pharma–Lotto accelerated out of the peloton after just 3 km (1.9 mi). No one joined him, and the German stayed out front alone for the next 215 km (134 mi), having held an advantage at one point of over 20 minutes. He had still been in first position over the fourth-category climb, meaning he was awarded the green jersey on the podium after the stage. After he was caught, some 26 km (16 mi) from the finish, an eight-man counter-attack formed. Their advantage was never greater than 30 seconds, and when Eduard Vorganov crashed 10 km (6.2 mi) from the end of the stage, the others lost their rhythm and were caught soon after. Garmin–Cervélo rode on the front of the peloton in the final kilometers, trying to set up the finish for their sprinter Tyler Farrar. At the finish, however, Farrar's last leadout man Murilo Fischer was unable to match the accelerations of Mark Renshaw and Danilo Hondo, respective leadout men for Mark Cavendish and Alessandro Petacchi, and the American faded to seventh on the day. Petacchi opened the sprint first, to the right of Renshaw, leaving Cavendish to take the line to Renshaw's left. Just as Cavendish occupied a position with open road in front of him, Petacchi deviated from his line and rode directly in front of Cavendish for a few meters. When Cavendish tried to go around Petacchi, the Italian again changed his line to stay in front of Cavendish. After a moment, both sprinted with open road in front of them, and Petacchi came across the line first by a matter of millimeters. Cavendish was visibly upset, shouting and gesticulating at Petacchi after they crossed the finish line.

Cavendish's 12-second time bonus for second place nonetheless made him the new overall race leader. Cavendish later explained that his frustration was not directed at Petacchi, but at race officials, since he felt he would be relegated if he had sprinted in a similar manner. However, he also said that he never had the intention of appealing the result. His sporting director Valerio Piva also took that stance, stating that Petacchi's sprint was "not really fair play." The next day, Cavendish made a point of apologizing to Petacchi via Twitter for his outburst after crossing the finish line.

Stage 2 result

	Rider	Team	Time
1	Alessandro Petacchi (ITA)	Lampre–ISD	5h 45' 40"
2	Mark Cavendish (GBR)	HTC–Highroad	s.t.
3	Manuel Belletti (ITA)	Colnago–CSF Inox	s.t.
4	Roberto Ferrari (ITA)	Androni Giocattoli	s.t.
5	Borut Božič (SLO)	Vacansoleil–DCM	s.t.
6	Davide Appollonio (ITA)	Team Sky	s.t.
7	Tyler Farrar (USA)	Garmin–Cervélo	s.t.
8	Robbie McEwen (AUS)	Team RadioShack	s.t.
9	Wouter Weylandt (BEL)	Leopard Trek	s.t.
10	Matteo Montaguti (ITA)	Ag2r–La Mondiale	s.t.

General classification after stage 2

	Rider	Team	Time
1	Mark Cavendish (GBR)	HTC–Highroad	6h 06' 27"
2	Kanstantsin Sivtsov (BLR)	HTC–Highroad	+ 12"
3	Craig Lewis (USA)	HTC–Highroad	+ 12"
4	Marco Pinotti (ITA)	HTC–Highroad	+ 12"
5	Lars Bak (DEN)	HTC–Highroad	+ 12"
6	Alessandro Petacchi (ITA)	Lampre–ISD	+ 16"
7	Robbie McEwen (AUS)	Team RadioShack	+ 22"
8	Fumiyuki Beppu (JPN)	Team RadioShack	+ 22"
9	Yaroslav Popovych (UKR)	Team RadioShack	+ 22"
10	Tiago Machado (POR)	Team RadioShack	+ 22"

== Stage 3 ==
9 May 2011 – Reggio Emilia to Rapallo, 173 km (107 mi)

This stage was categorized flat, though there were two climbs near the end. The third-category Passo del Bocco was expected to split the peloton, while the fourth-category Madonna delle Grazie climb was expected to make the finish trying for any sprinters remaining at the front of the race. Pre-race analysis led to speculation that the race lead would probably change hands on this stage. The departure town of Reggio Emilia was chosen for this Giro because it is where the flag of Italy was first created.

=== Race report ===
Four riders distinguished themselves as the day's breakaway – Bart De Clercq, Gianluca Brambilla, Pavel Brutt, and Davide Ricci Bitti. They established their position as the day's signature escape after 32 km (20 mi). Overnight race leader Mark Cavendish had repeated mechanical trouble, needing two full bike changes early in the stage. This gapped him off from the front of the race, leaving him three minutes back of the stage winner at day's end and surrendering the pink jersey. The break's time gap began to fall at the 60 km (37 mi) to go mark, having been at a maximum of six minutes. De Clercq tried to accelerate out of the breakaway for the mountains points at the top of the Passo del Bocco, since his teammate Sebastian Lang held the mountains jersey after his day-long breakaway in stage 2. He started his sprint much too early, however, and Brambilla beat him to the summit, making the Italian the new wearer of the green jersey. The main field, paced mostly by Lampre–ISD as they tried to keep the pace difficult to isolate Cavendish while protecting their sprinter Alessandro Petacchi, caught them with 12 km (7.5 mi) left to race. Shortly thereafter, another four-man group formed. After some moments, they were joined by David Millar to make for a leading quintet. This group stayed away to the finish, with Androni Giocattoli's Ángel Vicioso was easily the strongest sprinter present, taking the win. Millar's time bonus for second, coupled with the group's 21-second gap over the main field, made the Briton the new race leader.

Stage 3 result

	Rider	Team	Time
1	Ángel Vicioso (ESP)	Androni Giocattoli	3h 57' 38"
2	David Millar (GBR)	Garmin–Cervélo	s.t.
3	Pablo Lastras (ESP)	Movistar Team	s.t.
4	Daniel Moreno (ESP)	Team Katusha	s.t.
5	Christophe Le Mével (FRA)	Garmin–Cervélo	s.t.
6	Bram Tankink (NED)	Rabobank	+ 12"
7	Jérôme Pineau (FRA)	Quick-Step	+ 12"
8	Sacha Modolo (ITA)	Colnago–CSF Inox	+ 21"
9	Fabio Taborre (ITA)	Acqua & Sapone	+ 21"
10	Matteo Montaguti (ITA)	Ag2r–La Mondiale	+ 21"

General classification after stage 3

	Rider	Team	Time
1	David Millar (GBR)	Garmin–Cervélo	10h 04' 29"
2	Ángel Vicioso (ESP)	Androni Giocattoli	+ 7"
3	Kanstantsin Sivtsov (BLR)	HTC–Highroad	+ 9"
4	Marco Pinotti (ITA)	HTC–Highroad	+ 9"
5	Craig Lewis (USA)	HTC–Highroad	+ 9"
6	Christophe Le Mével (FRA)	Garmin–Cervélo	+ 12"
7	Alessandro Petacchi (ITA)	Lampre–ISD	+ 13"
8	Pablo Lastras (ESP)	Movistar Team	+ 18"
9	Yaroslav Popovych (UKR)	Team RadioShack	+ 19"
10	Tiago Machado (POR)	Team RadioShack	+ 19"

=== Death of Wouter Weylandt ===
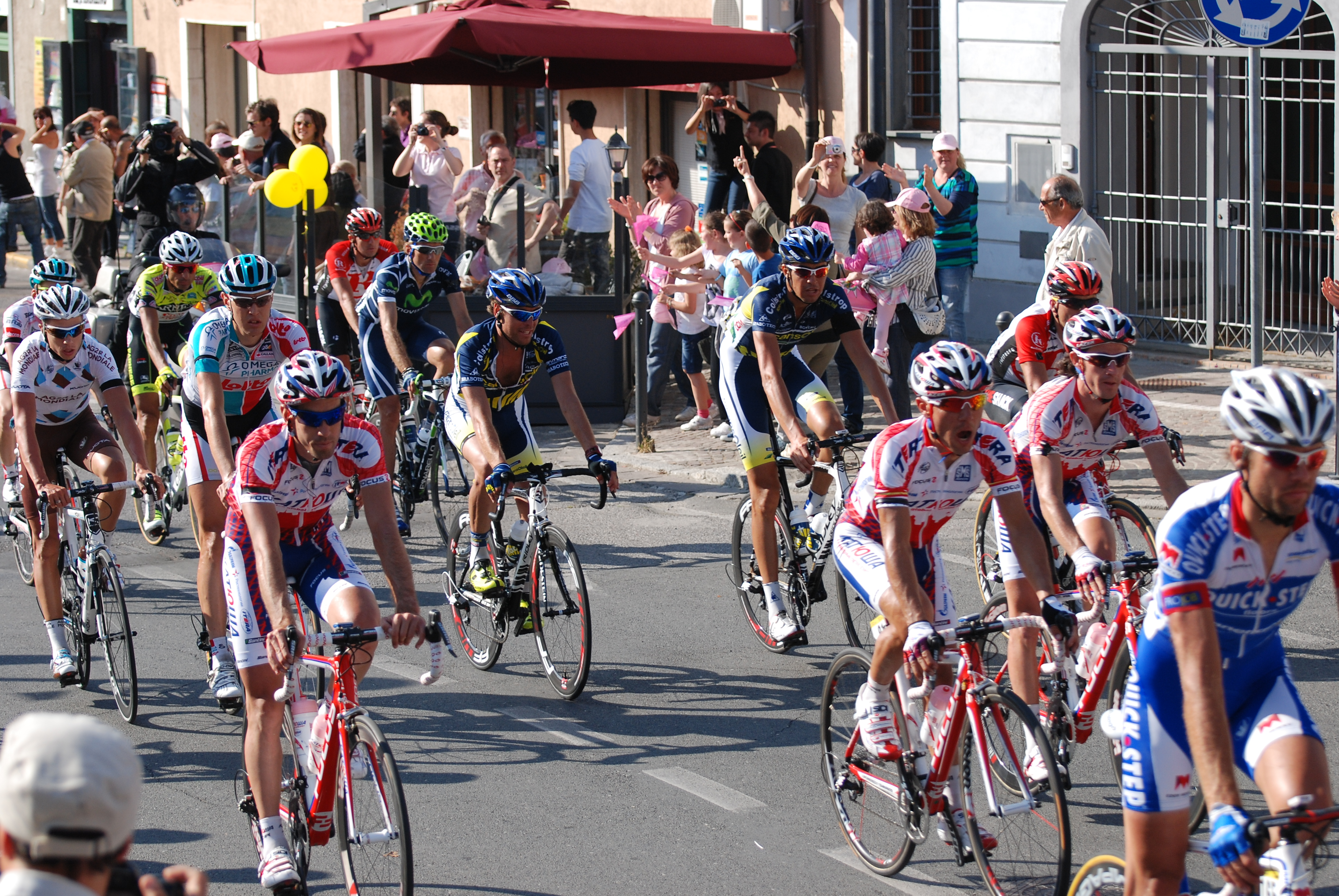
The majority of the field finished this stage 21 seconds behind the five leaders. None of the riders were aware of Wouter Weylandt's death until the stage had concluded fully.

During the descent of the Passo del Bocco, Leopard Trek rider Wouter Weylandt crashed and suffered catastrophic injury. Race doctor Giovanni Tredici, and the doctor for the Garmin–Cervélo team were in cars very near Weylandt's group on the road, and administered cardiopulmonary resuscitation for approximately 40 minutes. Doctors also gave Weylandt adrenaline and atropine to try to restart his heart, though Tredici stated that resuscitation efforts were rather clearly in vain, and that Weylandt was already dead by the time they got to him. Doctors were never able to revive Weylandt, and he was declared dead on the spot. A short time later, Weylandt's body was airlifted off the descent and taken to a nearby hospital, where the pathologist conducting the autopsy concluded that the Belgian had died immediately upon crashing. Weylandt's death was the first at the Giro in 25 years, and the first at one of cycling's Grand Tours since Fabio Casartelli died during the 1995 Tour de France.

Manuel Antonio Cardoso of Team RadioShack had been nearest to Weylandt when he crashed, and stated that Weylandt had touched a small retaining wall on the left side of the road with either his pedal or his handlebars, and was then catapulted across the road to the other side, where he again collided with something. He had looked behind him to ascertain his exact position in the race when he clipped the wall. Teammate Tom Stamsnijder also witnessed the accident, saying "it was a very hard fall." Italian police, conducting an inquest into Weylandt's death, also took an official statement from the Portuguese rider at Team RadioShack's hotel. A memorial was placed at the crash site, where Weylandt's widow and mother, along with cyclists, passersby and residents of nearby villages, placed flowers. The Leopard Trek team remained in the race for another day at the encouragement of Weylandt's family. Zomegnan said in a post-stage press conference that race officials would respect whatever decision the peloton made regarding the next day's stage. New race leader Millar spent the evening discussing with members of Leopard Trek, Weylandt's best friend Tyler Farrar, and his widow and mother how best to pay tribute to the fallen rider. Weylandt wore bib number 108 in the race, and Giro officials have said they will not assign the number in future editions of the race.

== Stage 4 ==
10 May 2011 – Quarto dei Mille to Livorno, 216 km (134 mi)

This stage was categorized medium mountain, though it was nearly as flat as stage 3. The third-category Passo del Bracco crested after 62 km (39 mi), and the fourth-category Montenero climb occurred just before the finish.

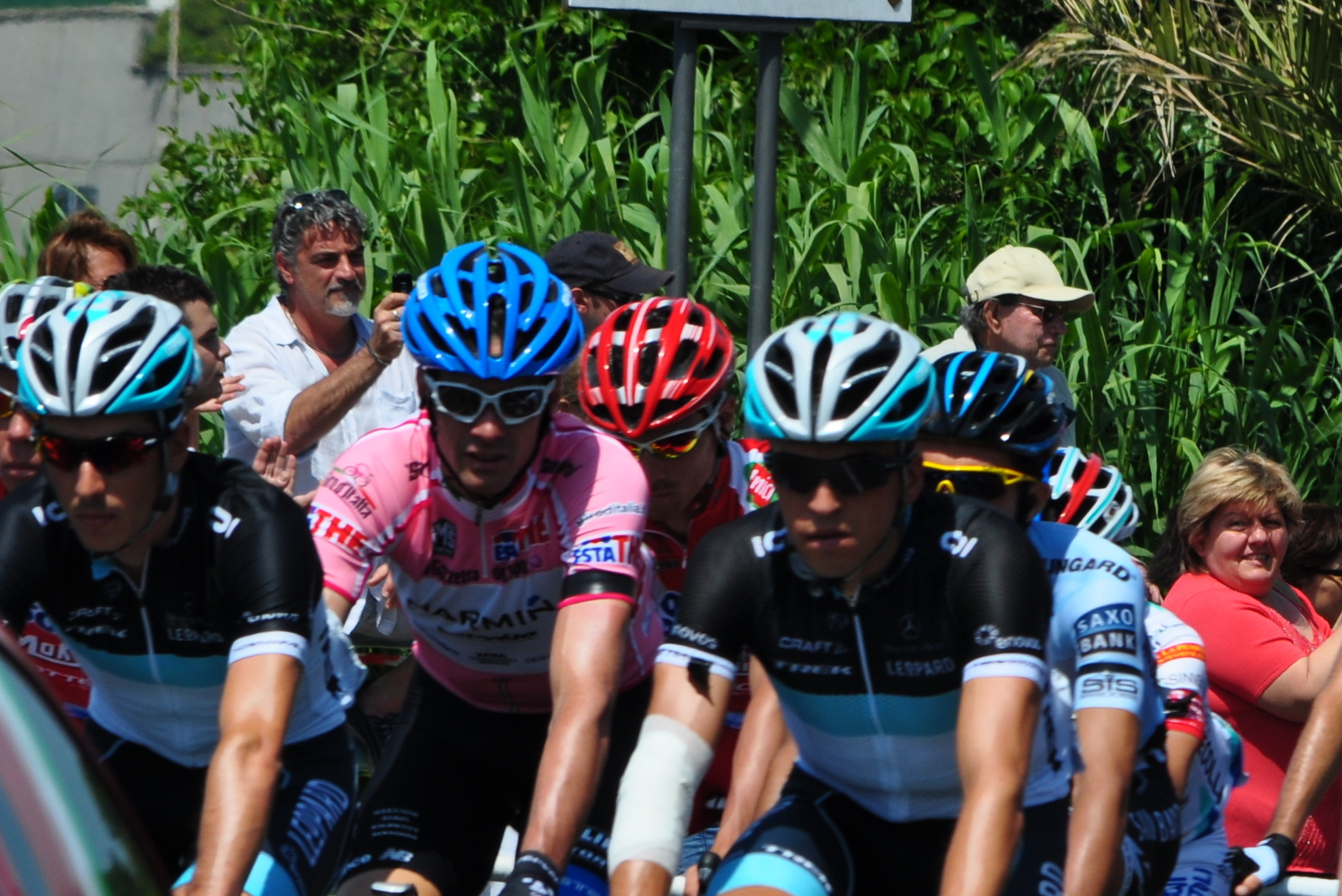
Race leader David Millar rides alongside Alberto Contador behind the Leopard Trek squad during the neutralized fourth stage.

Following the death of Wouter Weylandt, this stage was preceded by a minute's silence, and ridden as a procession in his memory. In keeping with convention, there was no competitive racing. Each of the 23 teams took to the front of the peloton for about 15 minutes, and members of his team Leopard Trek, along with his friend and training mate Tyler Farrar, were allowed to finish first with their arms around each other. Race leader David Millar led the rest of the field across the line a few seconds later. No results for the stage were recorded, and it did not count towards the general classification or any of the points competitions. After the stage, instead of any podium presentations, the four jersey classification leaders (Millar, Alessandro Petacchi, Gianluca Brambilla, and Jan Bakelants) appeared on stage with the Leopard Trek team to lead another moment of silence. Subsequently, Farrar and the remaining Leopard Trek squad all decided to leave the race.

Remained the General classification after stage 4

	Rider	Team	Time
1	David Millar (GBR)	Garmin–Cervélo	10h 04' 29"
2	Ángel Vicioso (ESP)	Androni Giocattoli	+ 7"
3	Kanstantsin Sivtsov (BLR)	HTC–Highroad	+ 9"
4	Marco Pinotti (ITA)	HTC–Highroad	+ 9"
5	Craig Lewis (USA)	HTC–Highroad	+ 9"
6	Christophe Le Mével (FRA)	Garmin–Cervélo	+ 12"
7	Alessandro Petacchi (ITA)	Lampre–ISD	+ 13"
8	Pablo Lastras (ESP)	Movistar Team	+ 18"
9	Yaroslav Popovych (UKR)	Team RadioShack	+ 19"
10	Tiago Machado (POR)	Team RadioShack	+ 19"

== Stage 5 ==
11 May 2011 – Piombino to Orvieto, 191 km (119 mi)

The profile for this stage was bumpy, but more significantly, it incorporated 23 km (14 mi) of unpaved roads. One analyst referred to the course profile as resembling "a mini Tour of Lombardy." Along with two third-category climbs on course, there was a brief uphill at the finish that counted as a mountain climb, as well as numerous uncategorized rises. Zomegnan selected this course specifically to include the sectors of so-called "white roads" after the similar stage in Tuscany in the 2010 Giro opened some large time gaps among the race favorites and was generally accepted as one of the race's more spectacular stages.

After the withdrawals of Tyler Farrar and Leopard Trek, 197 riders took the start for stage five. BMC Racing Team rider Martin Kohler went on the attack after 12 km (7.5 mi), and for the second time in this Giro, they day's principal breakaway comprised a single rider. His advantage ballooned to almost 13 minutes at one point, but even when it did begin to fall, it did not fall precipitously at first. With 70 km (43 mi) left to race, the Swiss rider still had eight minutes on the main field. He was therefore first over the two third-category climbs on the course, and while mountains leader Gianluca Brambilla took maximum points from the peloton on both, Kohler took the green jersey from him at day's end. Where the dirt roads had been muddy in the 2010 Giro, due to heavy rainfall the day that stage was run, on this dry, sunny day, the peloton's passage over unpaved roads led to massive amounts of dust being kicked up in the air.

Race leader David Millar and second-place man Ángel Vicioso collided and crashed while contesting the intermediate sprint for its bonus time. The crash would later prove costly for Millar. He was caught behind an acceleration from the Liquigas–Cannondale team at the top of the Croce di Fighime, the first dirt-road climb. The only riders with him after the split were Fabio Taborre and Valerio Agnoli, riders whose team leaders were up the road, meaning Millar would have to mount the chase all on his own. Nagging injuries from the crash and allergies exacerbated by the dust in the air made the task extremely trying for Millar. He bridged back up to the leading group once, but fell off a second time in the final dirt sector, eventually finishing 2'50" back on the day and surrendering the pink jersey. He later said that despite his effort, "it wasn't possible" to successfully defend the jersey. Numerous other crashes occurred on the day, with Rabobank's Tom Slagter's the most striking. The Dutch neo-pro lay prone on the road for several minutes, during which time race officials had to frantically wave oncoming riders to pass to the right of him. He was taken to a local hospital and diagnosed with a broken jaw, but was not seriously hurt.

Bram Tankink and Dario Cataldo were the first attackers out of the main field to try to bridge to Kohler, but both had mechanical trouble and had to drop back again. A short time after their effort, Pieter Weening and John Gadret successfully made the bridge, joining the front of the race with about 10 km (6.2 mi) left to race. After moments, Weening attacked out of this group and became the sole leader on the road, as Gadret and Kohler were both swept up by the group of overall favorites, the next on the road. Weening continued to hold a tenuous lead the rest of the way, but just as the overall favorites appeared to be about to overtake him, their tactics changed and they simply marked one another in the final kilometer. David Arroyo tried an acceleration with about 500 m (1,600 ft) to go, but it was much too late to have any effect, and Weening stayed away for the stage win. Fabio Duarte and José Serpa took the remaining time bonuses, for second and third, with Christophe Le Mével just behind. Had Le Mével taken any of the time bonuses on offer, he would have become the new race leader. Instead, Weening took the pink jersey, the first Dutchman to hold it since Jeroen Blijlevens in the 1999 Giro d'Italia. He gave the physical jersey awarded to him on the podium to Wouter Weylandt's family.

Stage 5 result

	Rider	Team	Time
1	Pieter Weening (NED)	Rabobank	4h 54' 49"
2	Fabio Duarte (COL)	Geox–TMC	+ 8"
3	José Serpa (COL)	Androni Giocattoli	+ 8"
4	Christophe Le Mével (FRA)	Garmin–Cervélo	+ 8"
5	Oscar Gatto (ITA)	Farnese Vini–Neri Sottoli	+ 8"
6	Vincenzo Nibali (ITA)	Liquigas–Cannondale	+ 8"
7	Alberto Contador (ESP)	Saxo Bank–SunGard	+ 8"
8	Michele Scarponi (ITA)	Lampre–ISD	+ 8"
9	Joaquim Rodríguez (ESP)	Team Katusha	+ 8"
10	Roman Kreuziger (CZE)	Astana	+ 8"

General classification after stage 5

	Rider	Team	Time
1	Pieter Weening (NED)	Rabobank	14h 59' 33"
2	Marco Pinotti (ITA)	HTC–Highroad	+ 2"
3	Kanstantsin Sivtsov (BLR)	HTC–Highroad	+ 2"
4	Christophe Le Mével (FRA)	Garmin–Cervélo	+ 5"
5	Pablo Lastras (ESP)	Movistar Team	+ 22"
6	Vincenzo Nibali (ITA)	Liquigas–Cannondale	+ 24"
7	Michele Scarponi (ITA)	Lampre–ISD	+ 26"
8	Steven Kruijswijk (NED)	Rabobank	+ 28"
9	Alberto Contador (ESP)	Saxo Bank–SunGard	+ 30"
10	José Serpa (COL)	Androni Giocattoli	+ 33"

== Stage 6 ==
12 May 2011 – Orvieto to Fiuggi, 216 km (134 mi)

There are no categorized climbs in this course, but it is again undulating, visiting the Apennines east of Rome. Michele Scarponi offered his analysis of the stage, believing it unlikely that it would be a stage for the sprinters, and that a small breakaway would likely decide the day. Zomegnan concurred that a breakaway would be likely to stay away on this stage, believing it a prelude to the Giro's first high mountain stage the next day.

This was a more straightforward day of racing than the one previous. Five riders formed the day's principal breakaway – Yaroslav Popovych, Kristof Vandewalle, Sacha Modolo, Frederik Veuchelen, and the original instigator Jussi Veikkanen. Their maximum advantage was left carefully controlled at six minutes. Modolo was the first to lose the pace, and rode for several kilometers in a no-man's land between the other four and the peloton, an effort that cost him sufficient strength that he finished last on the day. Veikkanen next fell off the pace to leave a leading trio. At this point, Modolo's teammate Stefano Pirazzi set off on the attack from the main field to try to bridge up to the leaders, but he was never able, being caught between the two groups for some 10 km (6.2 mi). Pirazzi's attack made little if any strategic sense, but it pleased the roadside fans who had brought signs showing their support for the Italian. With about 10 km left to race, Vandewalle tried to solo to the finish, leaving Popovych and Veuchelen behind to be swept up by the main field. His advantage was only 48 seconds at that point, and the peloton reabsorbed him with just under 2 km (1.2 mi) remaining. Attacks from David Millar, František Raboň, Matthias Frank, and Robert Kišerlovski were all very short-lived. Within the final kilometer, Danilo Di Luca took first position on the road and for a moment appeared poised for victory before he was passed up by former teammate Alessandro Petacchi. The points leader had started his sprint from nearly 600 m (2,000 ft) out, since leadout man Danilo Hondo pulled off at that point upon seeing that Francisco Ventoso and not Petacchi was sitting in his slipstream. Ventoso occupied first position with about 100 m (330 ft) to go, at which point it seemed that Petacchi was going to pass him and claim the stage win, but the Italian suddenly stopped pedaling just meters from the finish line, giving Ventoso the stage win. When interviewed by media shortly after the stage's conclusion, Petacchi was so exhausted that for over a minute he did not have sufficient breath to speak, and could only gasp for air. He later said he was satisfied with second on the day, since the uphill finish meant victory was unlikely for a field sprinter like him. Ventoso, for his part, had targeted this stage ahead of time, believing that the group that arrived at the finish together would be select and not include the entire peloton. The top ten in the overall standings were essentially unchanged, giving Pieter Weening another day in the pink jersey.

Stage 6 result

	Rider	Team	Time
1	Francisco Ventoso (ESP)	Movistar Team	5h 15' 39"
2	Alessandro Petacchi (ITA)	Lampre–ISD	s.t.
3	Roberto Ferrari (ITA)	Androni Giocattoli	s.t.
4	Danilo Di Luca (ITA)	Team Katusha	s.t.
5	Davide Appollonio (ITA)	Team Sky	s.t.
6	Michele Scarponi (ITA)	Lampre–ISD	s.t.
7	Christophe Le Mével (FRA)	Garmin–Cervélo	s.t.
8	Gerald Ciolek (GER)	Quick-Step	s.t.
9	Paolo Tiralongo (ITA)	Astana	s.t.
10	Ruggero Marzoli (ITA)	Acqua & Sapone	s.t.

General classification after stage 6

	Rider	Team	Time
1	Pieter Weening (NED)	Rabobank	20h 15' 12"
2	Kanstantsin Sivtsov (BLR)	HTC–Highroad	+ 2"
3	Marco Pinotti (ITA)	HTC–Highroad	+ 2"
4	Christophe Le Mével (FRA)	Garmin–Cervélo	+ 5"
5	Pablo Lastras (ESP)	Movistar Team	+ 22"
6	Vincenzo Nibali (ITA)	Liquigas–Cannondale	+ 24"
7	Michele Scarponi (ITA)	Lampre–ISD	+ 26"
8	Steven Kruijswijk (NED)	Rabobank	+ 28"
9	Alberto Contador (ESP)	Saxo Bank–SunGard	+ 30"
10	José Serpa (COL)	Androni Giocattoli	+ 33"

== Stage 7 ==
13 May 2011 – Maddaloni to Montevergine di Mercogliano, 110 km (68 mi)

Montevergine di Mercogliano is a frequently used summit arrival in the Giro. Damiano Cunego and Danilo Di Luca both won stages ending at this climb en route to overall victory, in 2004 and 2007 respectively. The climb is 17 km (11 mi) long but averages only 5 percent gradient, with its hardest sections at 10 percent. Former Giro champion Gilberto Simoni analyzed the stage, believing that with a flat stage to follow that the overall contenders would show themselves on this one, with a pure climber the likes of Joaquim Rodríguez perhaps the favorite.

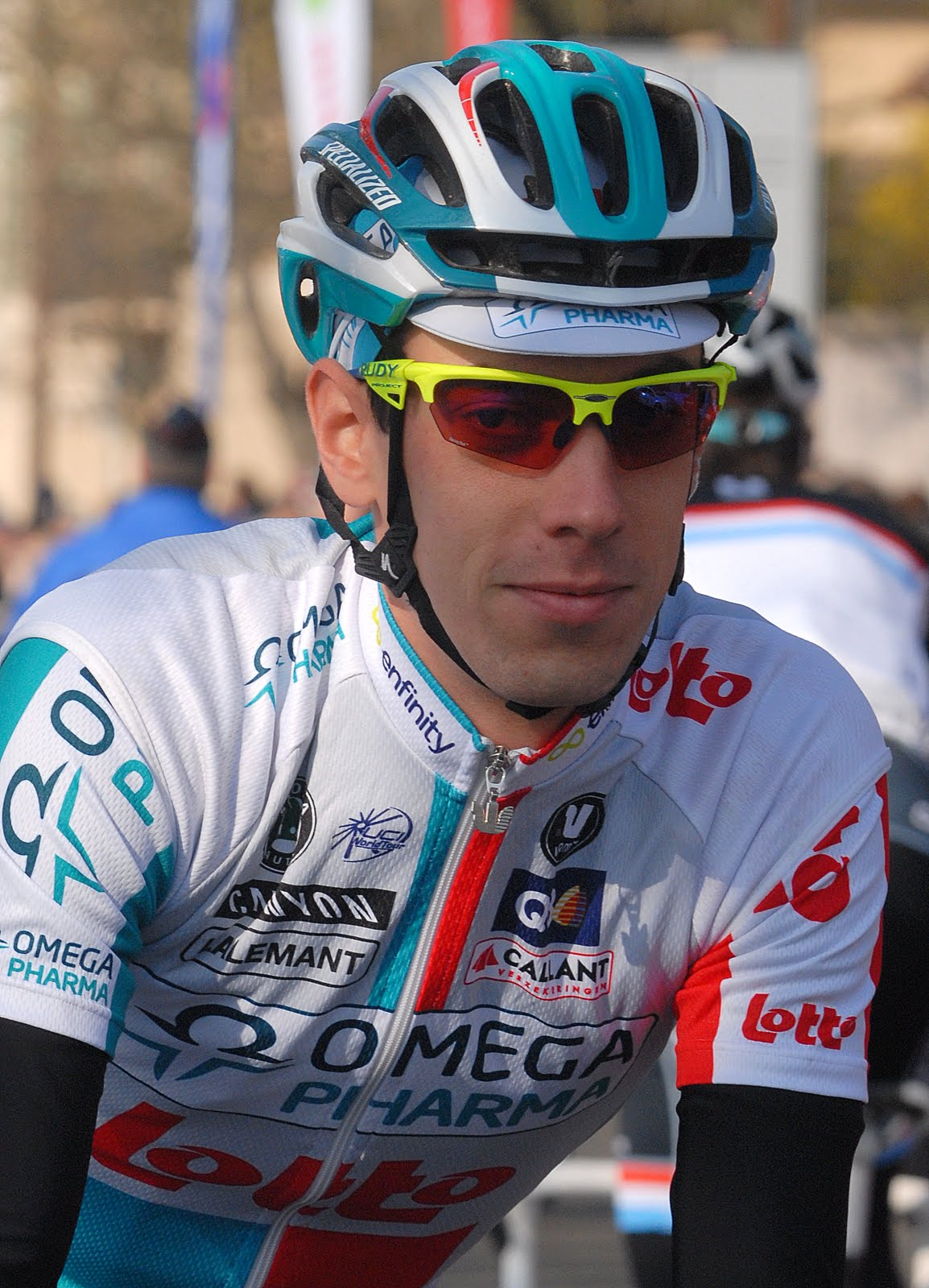
This stage was the first professional win for Bart De Clercq, a 24-year-old neo-pro.

This stage was largely similar to stage 5 in terms of how it played out. A five-rider breakaway distinguished itself after 40 km (25 mi), with Federico Canuti, Jérôme Pineau, Lars Bak, Giovanni Visconti, and Matteo Montaguti the riders involved. Their time gap was kept quite small, due to the short distance of the stage. Vacansoleil–DCM rider Johnny Hoogerland made the bridge to the leading group and not only kept their wheels, he pulled at the front for several kilometers. By the time the Montevergine climb, began Pineau and Visconti had been reabsorbed by the peloton. Canuti then crashed, and fell back. Bak was the rider to put in the solo attack, leaving Montaguti and Hoogerland behind. This was more likely to protect Kanstantsin Sivtsov's and Marco Pinotti's high positions in the overall classification than for Bak's own chances at victory, since the stocky Dane hardly had the right build to succeed on a summit finish. With their teammate up the road, Sivtsov and Pinotti could sit on wheels and led the onus for chasing down the remaining breakaway rider fall on other teams. Bak was caught with about 8 km (5.0 mi) remaining to race.

Omega Pharma–Lotto's Sebastian Lang briefly escaped, but later his teammate, Belgian neo-pro Bart De Clercq, was able to get away and build a solid lead. His advantage stretched to 30 seconds entering the final 3 km (1.9 mi), which averaged a 6% gradient. He still had a time gap entering the final kilometer. At this point, Michele Scarponi accelerated out of the group of overall favorites, second on the road, and the resultant responses brought the race's elite rapidly up to De Clercq at the front of the race. De Clercq was able to hold on for the first win of his pro career by about the length of his front tire.

De Clercq said after the stage that he had been suffering badly in the final 3 km and saw the elite riders closing on him, but managed to just maintain his advantage. He admitted that his departed compatriot Weylandt had not really been in his thoughts when he crossed the finish line. Roman Kreuziger, who took third on the stage, felt that Scarponi had been the strongest rider in the uphill sprint, but he also said he was pleased with his own placing. Stefano Garzelli, fourth on the day, had had his Acqua & Sapone squad doing the bulk of the pacemaking in the peloton at the foot of the climb and on its early stretches. He criticized his rivals' teams after the stage for a seeming lack of interest in stage wins, since none of them sent any riders to the front to aid the chase. Going against pre-stage expectations, race leader Pieter Weening managed to retain the pink jersey by finishing 19th on the day, safely in with the 26-rider group that finished together at the head of the race.

Stage 7 result

	Rider	Team	Time
1	Bart De Clercq (BEL)	Omega Pharma–Lotto	2h 54' 47"
2	Michele Scarponi (ITA)	Lampre–ISD	s.t.
3	Roman Kreuziger (CZE)	Astana	s.t.
4	Stefano Garzelli (ITA)	Acqua & Sapone	s.t.
5	Vincenzo Nibali (ITA)	Liquigas–Cannondale	s.t.
6	Joaquim Rodríguez (ESP)	Team Katusha	s.t.
7	José Rujano (VEN)	Androni Giocattoli	s.t.
8	Dario Cataldo (ITA)	Quick-Step	s.t.
9	Alberto Contador (ESP)	Saxo Bank–SunGard	s.t.
10	Christophe Le Mével (FRA)	Garmin–Cervélo	s.t.

General classification after stage 7

	Rider	Team	Time
1	Pieter Weening (NED)	Rabobank	23h 09' 59"
2	Kanstantsin Sivtsov (BLR)	HTC–Highroad	+ 2"
3	Marco Pinotti (ITA)	HTC–Highroad	+ 2"
4	Christophe Le Mével (FRA)	Garmin–Cervélo	+ 5"
5	Michele Scarponi (ITA)	Lampre–ISD	+ 14"
6	Pablo Lastras (ESP)	Movistar Team	+ 22"
7	Vincenzo Nibali (ITA)	Liquigas–Cannondale	+ 24"
8	Steven Kruijswijk (NED)	Rabobank	+ 28"
9	Alberto Contador (ESP)	Saxo Bank–SunGard	+ 30"
10	José Serpa (COL)	Androni Giocattoli	+ 33"

== Stage 8 ==
14 May 2011 – Sapri to Tropea, 217 km (135 mi)

This was a flat stage, with the course staying right along the Tyrrhenian coast. There were no categorized climbs, short uncategorized rises on course, and a slight, but sudden, uphill right at the finish.

Two Italian riders found an early breakaway in this stage. They were Vacansoleil–DCM's Mirko Selvaggi and Farnese Vini–Neri Sottoli's Leonardo Giordani. They rode off the front after just 2 km (1.2 mi) and were afforded nearly 11 minutes as their maximum time gap, a sizable margin considering the stage's flat profile. HTC–Highroad led the chase from the peloton for their sprinter Mark Cavendish, who noted before the stage that positioning coming into the slight uphill at the finale would be critical. Though their advantage held up than the stage's profile might have indicated, Giordani and Selvaggi did not stay away. The two Italians patted one another on the back as the main field passed them up with some 7.5 km (4.7 mi) to go. The Farnese Vini–Neri Sottoli team took over at the front at that point, setting up Oscar Gatto to accelerate out of the main field with just under 2 km (1.2 mi) remaining. He quickly attained a time gap, and with the uphill at the finish, the sprinters' teams were unable to bring him back, giving him the stage win. The day's major surprise came just behind him, as Saxo Bank–SunGard captain and prohibitive Giro favorite Alberto Contador duplicated Gatto's attack to surge clear moments later. He too stayed out front to the finish, coming in just behind Gatto to gain 5 seconds of actual time and a 12-second time bonus. This moved him up to fifth overall, best placed among the true overall favorites. Contador's manager Bjarne Riis commented after the stage that his star rider's attack had not been planned going into the stage, but he credited the Spaniard for seizing an opportunity when it presented itself.

Stage 8 result

	Rider	Team	Time
1	Oscar Gatto (ITA)	Farnese Vini–Neri Sottoli	4h 59' 45"
2	Alberto Contador (ESP)	Saxo Bank–SunGard	s.t.
3	Alessandro Petacchi (ITA)	Lampre–ISD	+ 5"
4	Alexander Kristoff (NOR)	BMC Racing Team	+ 5"
5	Roberto Ferrari (ITA)	Androni Giocattoli	+ 5"
6	Davide Appollonio (ITA)	Team Sky	+ 5"
7	Francisco Ventoso (ESP)	Movistar Team	+ 5"
8	Rinaldo Nocentini (ITA)	Ag2r–La Mondiale	+ 5"
9	Christophe Le Mével (FRA)	Garmin–Cervélo	+ 5"
10	Klaas Lodewyck (BEL)	Omega Pharma–Lotto	+ 5"

General classification after stage 8

	Rider	Team	Time
1	Pieter Weening (NED)	Rabobank	28h 09' 49"
2	Kanstantsin Sivtsov (BLR)	HTC–Highroad	+ 2"
3	Marco Pinotti (ITA)	HTC–Highroad	+ 2"
4	Christophe Le Mével (FRA)	Garmin–Cervélo	+ 5"
5	Alberto Contador (ESP)	Saxo Bank–SunGard	+ 13"
6	Michele Scarponi (ITA)	Lampre–ISD	+ 14"
7	Pablo Lastras (ESP)	Movistar Team	+ 22"
8	Vincenzo Nibali (ITA)	Liquigas–Cannondale	+ 24"
9	Steven Kruijswijk (NED)	Rabobank	+ 28"
10	José Serpa (COL)	Androni Giocattoli	+ 33"

== Stage 9 ==
15 May 2011 – Messina to Etna, 169 km (105 mi)

Europe's most active volcano was the principal feature of stage 9. The peloton ascended the mountain twice, first up the northern face and then on the steeper southern face for a summit arrival. The departure town of Messina is general classification contender Vincenzo Nibali's hometown, and pre-race analysis expected that he may target this stage for that reason.

The Giro's most difficult stage so far also featured the largest morning breakaway so far. Nine riders found the breakaway, among them Giovanni Visconti and Yaroslav Popovych, both of whom had been in breakaways earlier in the race also, as well as Pablo Lastras, who came into the day in seventh place in the overall classification. Their maximum advantage was five minutes, though after the chase had begun in earnest and the time gap fell to 3'32" it again went up to 4'27". The official beginning of the Etna summit finish came with just under 20 km (12 mi) to race, but the road went uphill for easily twice that distance, meaning the final climb was quite long indeed. At 13 km (8.1 mi) to go, only Visconti, Lastras, Mathias Frank and Jan Bakelants remained at the front of the race, with a gap of 2'30" over the group of overall favorites and their remaining teammates. Bakelants tried a solo move at this point, but this succeeded in only in dropping Lastras, and the other three continued to form a leading trio.

At about 10 km (6.2 mi) to go, race leader Pieter Weening lost the pace of the group of favorites, after he had held it during the first ascent of Etna. He finished the day six and a half minutes back of the stage winner, now the fourth rider to lose the pink jersey. Around this time, Bakelants accelerated from the front of the race again to become sole leader on the road. José Rujano also put in a move from the group of favorites and quickly got a time gap.

Just after Rujano's move came an acceleration from overall favorite Alberto Contador. Michele Scarponi tried to follow, but very quickly lost the pace and struggled even to keep the pace of those Contador initially left behind, ceding 17 seconds at the finish line to most of the other overall contenders. Rujano put in an intensive effort simply to hold Contador's wheel. The two very quickly passed up the remaining three riders from the morning breakaway, and attained nearly a minute's advantage over the other contenders in only about 2 kilometers. Contador gestured to Rujano to seemingly ask him to take a pull at the front, but when the Venezuelan did not do so, Contador shed him as well to solo to a dominant stage win. Though Contador had won the 2008 Giro d'Italia, this was his first stage win at the Italian Grand Tour.

Everyone lost major time to Contador. Stefano Garzelli, Vincenzo Nibali, Roman Kreuziger, David Arroyo, and Kanstantsin Sivtsov (who began the day second overall and retained that position) lost 50 seconds. Igor Antón lost 59 seconds. Scarponi's group 1'07" down also included Christophe Le Mével and José Serpa. The most noteworthy time losses among the overall contenders were sustained by Denis Menchov and Joaquim Rodríguez. Both lost over two minutes, which coupled with mediocre stage 1 team trial performances effectively eliminated the overall hopes for either, as they sat over three minutes down in 20th and 22nd place respectively. At the end of the day, the group containing Mark Cavendish and several of his teammates and leadout men narrowly missed disqualification based on the time cut, beating the minimum survival time by 30 seconds. This near miss touched off a bit of controversy, as fellow sprinter Francisco Ventoso claimed that Cavendish had illegally used the race caravan for slipstreams to ease his way up the mountain and should have been disqualified. Two riders, however, did succumb to the time cut, Robbie McEwen and Graeme Brown. The two Australian sprinters had remarkably finished nearly an hour slower than Contador and over half an hour beyond the time cut, leading to their disqualifications from the race. After the stage, Nibali and Kreuziger both commented that Contador seemed well better than the rest of the field on Etna, though the Spaniard himself cautioned that there was a long way and several very difficult stages left to go in the race.

Stage 9 result

	Rider	Team	Time
1	Alberto Contador (ESP)	Saxo Bank–SunGard	4h 54' 09"
2	José Rujano (VEN)	Androni Giocattoli	+ 3"
3	Stefano Garzelli (ITA)	Acqua & Sapone	+ 50"
4	Vincenzo Nibali (ITA)	Liquigas–Cannondale	+ 50"
5	Roman Kreuziger (CZE)	Astana	+ 50"
6	David Arroyo (ESP)	Movistar Team	+ 50"
7	Kanstantsin Sivtsov (BLR)	HTC–Highroad	+ 50"
8	Igor Antón (ESP)	Euskaltel–Euskadi	+ 59"
9	John Gadret (FRA)	Ag2r–La Mondiale	+ 1' 07"
10	Hubert Dupont (FRA)	Ag2r–La Mondiale	+ 1' 07"

General classification after stage 9

	Rider	Team	Time
1	Alberto Contador (ESP)	Saxo Bank–SunGard	33h 03' 51"
2	Kanstantsin Sivtsov (BLR)	HTC–Highroad	+ 59"
3	Christophe Le Mével (FRA)	Garmin–Cervélo	+ 1' 19"
4	Vincenzo Nibali (ITA)	Liquigas–Cannondale	+ 1' 21"
5	Michele Scarponi (ITA)	Lampre–ISD	+ 1' 28"
6	David Arroyo (ESP)	Movistar Team	+ 1' 37"
7	Roman Kreuziger (CZE)	Astana	+ 1' 41"
8	José Serpa (COL)	Androni Giocattoli	+ 1' 47"
9	Dario Cataldo (ITA)	Quick-Step	+ 2' 21"
10	Matteo Carrara (ITA)	Vacansoleil–DCM	+ 2' 21"

== Stage 10 ==
17 May 2011 – Termoli to Teramo, 159 km (99 mi)

This stage was to take place after a very long transfer on the race's first rest day and was to be another flat stage. Scarponi believed that with the long, shallow uphill at the end of the course it was unlikely to feature a mass sprint, instead favoring an attacking rider like Di Luca. This stage visited the small Molise region, one of 17 visited by this year's Giro, due to unification celebrations (the three regions not visited – Sardinia, Apulia, and Valle d'Aosta – would be utilized in later editions of the Giro). The course turned northwards to head back towards the finishing city of Milan. Zomegnan, unlike Scarponi, believed that this would be a sprinter's stage.

Nearly immediately after the true beginning of the stage, Fumiyuki Beppu and Pierre Cazaux went on the attack and got clear of the field. Yuriy Krivtsov made the bridge a short while later, and the three formed the day's breakaway. When their time gap began to exceed six minutes, Saxo Bank–SunGard took to the front of the peloton to protect race leader Alberto Contador. Beppu did most of the work in the breakaway, and won the one hill climb and intermediate sprint on the course. At 50 km (31 mi) to go, the time gap had fallen to under three minutes, which meant the peloton risked catching the escapees too early and inviting a counter move. Their pace eased a bit, and the trio was not brought back until 11.6 km (7.2 mi) to go. No one attempted a counterattack at that time. The sprint teams, most notably HTC–Highroad and Movistar Team, took over at the front at that point. As the peloton passed under the 3 km (1.9 mi) to go banner, former race leader David Millar surged clear. He occupied first position until just before the red kite at 1 km (0.62 mi) to go. HTC–Highroad had been the ones to chase him down, and in so doing their sprinter Mark Cavendish was left without his usual leadout train – from Cavendish's team only he, Kanstantsin Sivtsov and Marco Pinotti (two general classification riders), finished with the leading group. Danilo Hondo was in position to lead out Alessandro Petacchi, but pulled off early and left the Italian to sprint for victory from 250 m (820 ft) out. This was much too far, as Petacchi admitted after the stage. At 150 m (490 ft) to go, Cavendish came around Petacchi and easily had the speed to beat him to the finish line for the stage win. Francisco Ventoso also overtook Petacchi, to finish second. After the stage, Cavendish addressed Ventoso's remarks from the day before, challenging the Spaniard to join him in the gruppetto for a stage. Cavendish claimed that, due to his celebrity status, he was always surrounded by race officials and cameramen, even when he was nowhere near the front of the race. There was no significant change to the overall classification with the day's results.

Stage 10 result

	Rider	Team	Time
1	Mark Cavendish (GBR)	HTC–Highroad	4h 00' 49"
2	Francisco Ventoso (ESP)	Movistar Team	s.t.
3	Alessandro Petacchi (ITA)	Lampre–ISD	s.t.
4	Roberto Ferrari (ITA)	Androni Giocattoli	s.t.
5	Davide Appollonio (ITA)	Team Sky	s.t.
6	Francesco Chicchi (ITA)	Quick-Step	s.t.
7	Klaas Lodewyck (BEL)	Omega Pharma–Lotto	s.t.
8	Sacha Modolo (ITA)	Colnago–CSF Inox	s.t.
9	Alexander Kristoff (NOR)	BMC Racing Team	s.t.
10	Oscar Gatto (ITA)	Farnese Vini–Neri Sottoli	s.t.

General classification after stage 10

	Rider	Team	Time
1	Alberto Contador (ESP)	Saxo Bank–SunGard	37h 04' 40"
2	Kanstantsin Sivtsov (BLR)	HTC–Highroad	+ 59"
3	Christophe Le Mével (FRA)	Garmin–Cervélo	+ 1' 19"
4	Vincenzo Nibali (ITA)	Liquigas–Cannondale	+ 1' 21"
5	Michele Scarponi (ITA)	Lampre–ISD	+ 1' 28"
6	David Arroyo (ESP)	Movistar Team	+ 1' 37"
7	Roman Kreuziger (CZE)	Astana	+ 1' 41"
8	José Serpa (COL)	Androni Giocattoli	+ 1' 47"
9	Dario Cataldo (ITA)	Quick-Step	+ 2' 21"
10	Matteo Carrara (ITA)	Vacansoleil–DCM	+ 2' 21"

== Stage 11 ==
18 May 2011 – Tortoreto to Castelfidardo, 142 km (88 mi)

This was another heavily undulating stage. Four fourth-category ascents were the only point-awarding climbs, but at least eight other uncategorized rises occurred. The stage ended about 50 km (31 mi) from Scarponi's hometown, and one pre-race analyst expected him to be among the attackers on the day. Scarponi himself seemed to leave the possibility open. This was the first time the departure town of Tortoreto has featured in the Giro.

Race leader Alberto Contador hinted in the previous days that he and his team may tactically relinquish the pink jersey in this stage. While the sprinters teams took up the chase in stage 10 and were likely to do so again in the even flatter stage 12, there was no particular benefit (beyond a difficult-to-achieve stage victory) to any team to chasing down a breakaway on a hilly course like this one. Thus, it made this day's breakaway a very important one, since one of its members could quite possibly obtain the race leadership.

The day's racing was preceded by a moment of silence and a blessing from a Catholic priest for Wouter Weylandt, whose funeral was held the same day. Because of the significance to this particular breakaway, it took a very long time for a group to get away. Nearly half the stage was covered before 11 riders from 10 teams (Acqua & Sapone was the squad to place two riders in the break) came clear. The best-placed man in the group was Christophe Le Mével, third overall and a rider who had come close to claiming the pink jersey earlier in the Giro. Le Mével said he went for the break "on instinct," and had not planned to escape, since he figured his high GC position would keep him from being allowed up the road. Le Mével was the virtual race leader much of the day, when the group's time gap over the peloton exceeded the 1'19" by which he trailed Contador entering the stage. The time gap held steady at two minutes for much of the stage. In the peloton, Contador spoke with Le Mével's teammates David Millar and Murilo Fischer, likely discussing whether the Spaniard was content to allow Le Mével to take the race lead.

The breakaway group's teamwork fell apart when Team Katusha's Daniel Moreno sprinted for the last hill climb, 26 km (16 mi) from the finish. Instead of waiting for the other riders to rejoin him, he kept riding hard. The other riders were unable to work together in any effort to chase Moreno down. Le Mével led a four-man chase, with catching Moreno and maintaining the time gap over Contador of equal concern, but Moreno's advantage continued to increase. Movistar Team's Ignatas Konovalovas, a time trial specialist who won the second individual time trial at the 2009 Giro d'Italia, put those skills to work by escaping Le Mével's group and catching Moreno with 9.6 km (6.0 mi) remaining. With 3 km (1.9 mi) to go, the peloton caught all the breakaway members except Konovalovas and Moreno, who held a 45-second advantage. They had been driven mostly by Lampre–ISD, with even points leader Alessandro Petacchi taking pulls at the front of the main field, to set up their captain Michele Scarponi. The final kilometer of the stage featured a section with a 10% gradient. Konovalovas and Moreno had 11 seconds going into it. Moreno shed the Lithuanian with 450 m (1,480 ft) remaining, only to be passed up himself by Ag2r–La Mondiale's John Gadret with 200 m (660 ft) to go. Gadret's attack proved to have the right timing, as the Frenchman stayed in first position across the line for the stage win. Gadret said he had had Weylandt on his mind when racing, and although the two were not well acquainted, Gadret dedicated his win to the fallen Belgian. Gadret called it "the most beautiful win in [his] career." It was his first Grand Tour stage win and his team's first Giro stage win since the 2006 Giro d'Italia. He described seeing Konovalovas and Moreno slowing, and knew that the overall contenders in the main field were not gunning for the stage win, which made him decide to make his well-fated attack. Scarponi admitted after the stage that he had hoped for victory, but Gadret's attack caught the field by surprise. He praised his team, mentioning Petacchi in particular, for their hard work at the front of the race much of the day. Largely due to Scarponi's team, Contador retained the pink jersey. There was a minor change to the overall standings. After being caught, Le Mével missed a late split at the front of the race and finished 13 seconds back. Since he won bonus time in the breakaway, his loss for the day was 9 seconds, but this was still enough to drop him from third to fourth overall. Contador said after the stage that he would have been perfectly happy to let Le Mével take the jersey, but the ambitions of other teams (namely, the stage win) meant the peloton had little choice but to catch the breakaway.

Stage 11 result

	Rider	Team	Time
1	John Gadret (FRA)	Ag2r–La Mondiale	3h 33' 11"
2	Joaquim Rodríguez (ESP)	Team Katusha	s.t.
3	Giovanni Visconti (ITA)	Farnese Vini–Neri Sottoli	s.t.
4	José Serpa (COL)	Androni Giocattoli	s.t.
5	Alberto Contador (ESP)	Saxo Bank–SunGard	s.t.
6	Roman Kreuziger (CZE)	Astana	s.t.
7	Dario Cataldo (ITA)	Quick-Step	s.t.
8	Michele Scarponi (ITA)	Lampre–ISD	s.t.
9	Pablo Lastras (ESP)	Movistar Team	s.t.
10	Vincenzo Nibali (ITA)	Liquigas–Cannondale	s.t.

General classification after stage 11

	Rider	Team	Time
1	Alberto Contador (ESP)	Saxo Bank–SunGard	40h 37' 51"
2	Kanstantsin Sivtsov (BLR)	HTC–Highroad	+ 59"
3	Vincenzo Nibali (ITA)	Liquigas–Cannondale	+ 1' 21"
4	Christophe Le Mével (FRA)	Garmin–Cervélo	+ 1' 28"
5	Michele Scarponi (ITA)	Lampre–ISD	+ 1' 28"
6	David Arroyo (ESP)	Movistar Team	+ 1' 37"
7	Roman Kreuziger (CZE)	Astana	+ 1' 41"
8	José Serpa (COL)	Androni Giocattoli	+ 1' 47"
9	Dario Cataldo (ITA)	Quick-Step	+ 2' 21"
10	Matteo Carrara (ITA)	Vacansoleil–DCM	+ 2' 21"
