= Amstel Curaçao Race =

Road bicycle race in Curaçao

Race details
- Date: November
- Region: Curaçao
- Type: One-day race
- Web site: www.amstelcuracaorace.com

History
- First edition: 2002
- Editions: 12 (2013)
- First winner: Michael Boogerd (NED)
- Most wins: Alberto Contador (ESP); Niki Terpstra (NED) (2 times each)
- Most recent: ♂ Niki Terpstra (NED) ♀ Ellen van Dijk (NED)

The Amstel Curaçao Race was a road bicycle race held on Curaçao, an island off the Venezuelan coast. The last race was held in 2014. The race was generally about 80 kilometres long and was held at the end of the cycling season. Since it is not as competitive as many other races (it is not included in the UCI World Tour), the Amstel Curaçao Race is considered to be an 'after-party' to the cycling season. Despite its comparative unimportance, the race has been won by several notable cyclists, including classics specialist Tom Boonen and Grand Tour winners Andy Schleck, Alejandro Valverde and Alberto Contador. The race is sponsored by the Netherlands brewery Amstel, who also sponsor the more eminent Amstel Gold Race, a one day classic held in the Netherlands. Contador and Terpstra currently stand as the most prolific winners of the race with two wins each.

== List of winners ==
Year	♂/♀	First	Second	Third
2002	♂	(Netherlands) Michael Boogerd	(Italy) Paolo Bettini	(Netherlands) Stefan Van Dijk
2003	♂	(Belgium) Peter Van Petegem	(Spain) Alejandro Valverde	(Netherlands) Michael Boogerd
2004	♂	(Spain) Óscar Freire	(Netherlands) Max van Heeswijk	(Italy) Davide Rebellin
2005	♂	(Belgium) Tom Boonen	(Italy) Paolo Savoldelli	(Netherlands) Pieter Weening
2006	♂	(Spain) Alejandro Valverde	(Luxembourg) Fränk Schleck	(Netherlands) Erik Dekker
2007	♂	(Spain) Alberto Contador	(Netherlands) Thomas Dekker	(Luxembourg) Fränk Schleck
2008	♂	(Luxembourg) Andy Schleck	(Belgium) Stijn Devolder	(Netherlands) Theo Bos
2009	♂	(Spain) Alberto Contador	(Norway) Thor Hushovd	(Netherlands) Koos Moerenhout
2010	♂	(Luxembourg) Fränk Schleck	(Italy) Alessandro Petacchi	(Netherlands) Niki Terpstra
2011	♂	(Germany) Marcel Kittel	(Luxembourg) Andy Schleck	(Netherlands) Johnny Hoogerland
2012	♂	(Netherlands) Niki Terpstra	(Curaçao) Marc de Maar	(Belgium) Thomas De Gendt
2012	♀	(Netherlands) Marianne Vos	(Netherlands) Ellen van Dijk	(Netherlands) Annemiek van Vleuten
2013	♂	(Netherlands) Johnny Hoogerland	(Belgium) Jan Bakelants	(Curaçao) Marc de Maar
2013	♀	(Netherlands) Ellen van Dijk	(Curaçao) Lisa Groothuesheidkamp	(Netherlands) Ines klok
2014	♂	(Netherlands) Niki Terpstra	(Belgium) Tim Wellens	(Netherlands) Sebastian Langeveld
