= 2012 Amstel Curaçao Race =

Race details
- Dates: 3 November
- Stages: 1
- Distance: 73.6 km (45.7 mi)
- Winning time: ♂ 1h 49' 50", ♀ 1h 50' 52"

Results
	Winner	♂ Niki Terpstra (NED) ♀ Marianne Vos (NED)	(Omega Pharma–Quick-Step) (Rabobank Women Cycling Team)
	Second	♂ Marc De Maar (CUR) ♀ Ellen van Dijk (NED)	(UnitedHealth Group#UnitedHealthcare) (Team Specialized–lululemon)
	Third	♂ Thomas De Gendt (BEL) ♀ Annemiek van Vleuten (NED)	(Vacansoleil–DCM) (Rabobank Women Cycling Team)

The 2012 Amstel Curaçao Race took place on 3 November 2012. It was the 11th edition of the Amstel Curaçao Race. The race was held on Curaçao, an island off the Venezuelan coast and spanned 73.6 km (45.7 mi). It was the only road bicycle race in which men and women competed against each other in the same race.

== Results ==
Men's results

#	Cyclist	Team	Time
1	Niki Terpstra (NED)	Omega Pharma–Quick-Step	1h 49' 50"
2	Marc De Maar (CUR)	UnitedHealth Group#UnitedHealthcare	s.t.
3	Thomas De Gendt (BEL)	Vacansoleil–DCM	+ 4"
4	François Van Rooij (NED)	Ogott	+ 6"
5	Bert-Jan Lindeman (NED)	Vacansoleil–DCM	+ 12"
6	Peter Koning (NED)	Metec continental team	+ 12"
7	Wilfrid Camelia (CUR)	PPCC	+ 56"
8	Mitchell Cornelisse (NED)	-	+ 57"
9	Quinten Winkel (CUR)	Bellisima	+ 59"
10	Sebastiaan Ton (CUR)	Bellisima	+ 1' 01"

Women's results

#*	Cyclist	Team	Time
1 (12)	Marianne Vos (NED)	Rabobank Women Cycling Team	1h 50' 52"
2 (21)	Ellen van Dijk (NED)	Team Specialized–lululemon	+ 40"
3 (22)	Annemiek van Vleuten (NED)	Rabobank Women Cycling Team	+ 1' 05"
4 (41)	Loes Gunnewijk (NED)	Orica–GreenEDGE	+ 4' 16"
5 (49)	Joukje Braam (NED)	Toni marchell	+ 9' 00"
6 (51)	Aagtje Dijkman (NED)	NWTT/Peoples Trust	+ 9' 01"
7 (53)	Anneke Beerten (NED)	-	+ 9' 01"
8 (58)	Irene Tesink (NED)	Amsterdam Cycling Babes	+ 9' 04"
9 (73)	Lisa Groothuesheidkamp (CUR)	PPCC	+ 11' 50"
10 (75)	Marlies Kort (CUR)	-	+ 11' 54"

*Rank (position including men). Source
