= 2013 Amstel Curaçao Race =

Race details
- Dates: 2 November
- Stages: 1
- Distance: 73.6 km (45.73 mi)
- Winning time: Men 2h 05' 21"; Women 2h 10' 10"

Results
	Winner	Men Johnny Hoogerland (NED); Women Ellen van Dijk (NED)

The 2013 Amstel Curaçao Race was the 12th edition of the Amstel Curaçao Race and takes place on Curaçao, an island off the Venezuelan coast, on 2 November 2013. The course is 73.6 km (45.7 mi). It is the only road bicycle race in which men and women compete against each other in the same race.

== Results ==
Men's results

#	Cyclist	Team	Time
1	Johnny Hoogerland (NED)	Vacansoleil–DCM	2h 05' 21"
2	Jan Bakelants (BEL)	RadioShack–Leopard	+ 16"
3	Marc de Maar (CUW)	UnitedHealthcare	+ 19"
4	Hillard Cijntje (CUW)	Pedal Pushers	+ 4' 19"
5	Wilfrid Camelia (CUW)	Pedal Pushers	+ 4' 19"
6	Boy van Poppel (NED)	Vacansoleil–DCM	+ 4' 23"
7	Wout Poels (NED)	Vacansoleil–DCM	+ 4' 29"
8	Pieter Weening (NED)	Orica–GreenEDGE	+ 4' 29"
9	Warren Barguil (FRA)	Argos–Shimano	+ 4' 29"
10	Ruiggeri Pinedoe (CUW)	Pedal Pushers	+ 4' 33"

Women's results

#	Cyclist	Team	Time
1	Ellen van Dijk (NED)	Specialized–lululemon	2h 10' 10"
2	Lisa Groothuesheidkamp (CUW)	P.P.C.C	s.t.
3	Ines klok (NED)		s.t.
4	Maaike Boogaard (NED)	HRTC Hoorn	s.t.
5	Joukje Braam (NED)	Toni marchell	+ 15' 23"
6	Hannah Welter (NED)	Parkhotel Valkenburg	+ 15' 23"
7	Leonie Dingemans (NED)	KLM Wings Of Support	+ 15' 23"
8	Amanda Tuttle (USA)		+ 15' 23"
9	Yvonne Baltus (NED)	PPCC	+ 23' 53"
10	Kathie Sanderson Morgan (CUW)		+ 24' 33"
