= Frederiek Nolf =

Belgian cyclist

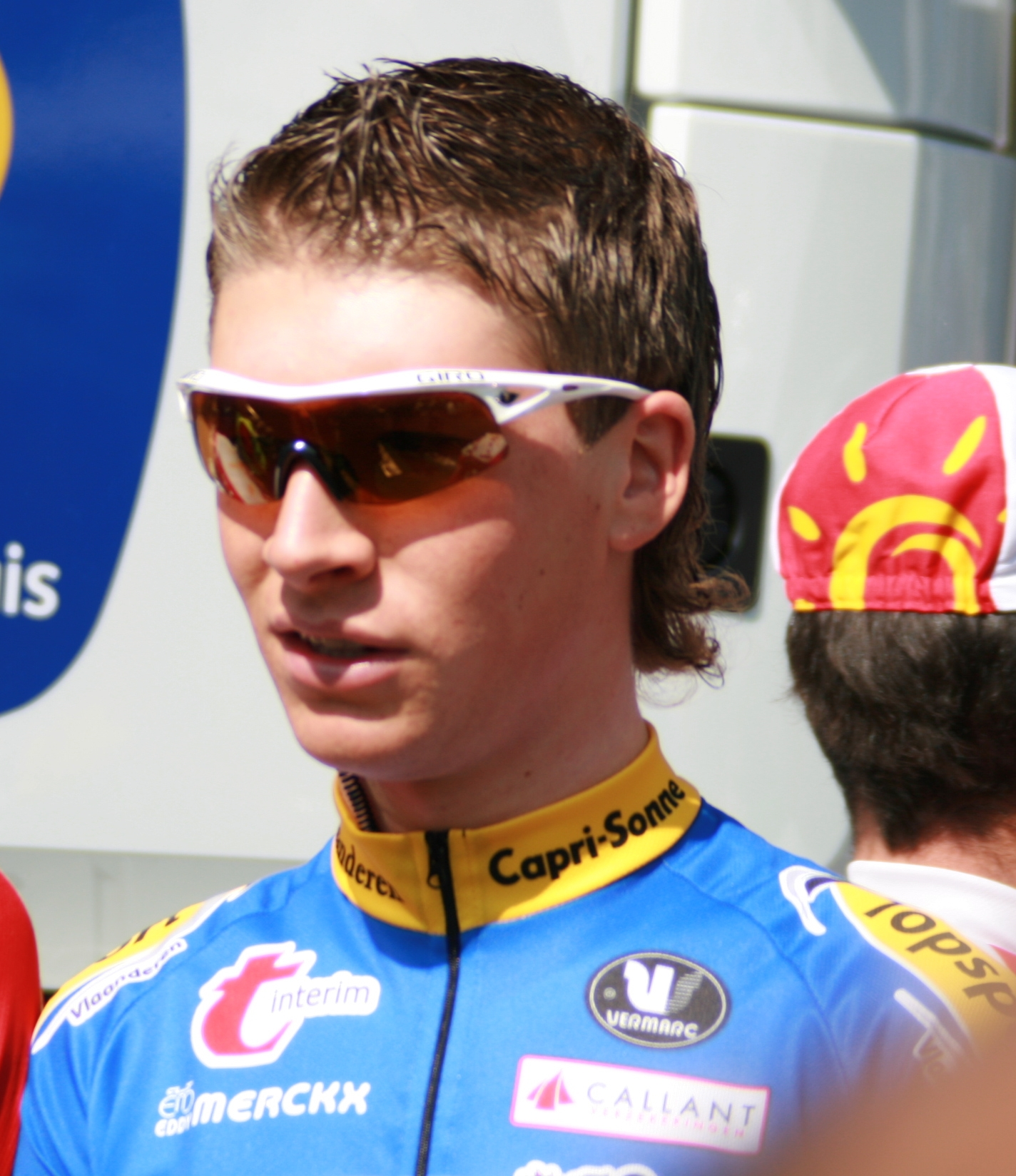

Personal information
- Full name: Frederiek Nolf
- Born: 10 February 1987 Kortrijk, Belgium
- Died: 5 February 2009 (aged 21) Doha, Qatar

Cycling career
- Sport: Cycling
- Discipline: Road
- Role: Rider

Professional team
- 2008–2009: Topsport Vlaanderen

Frederiek Nolf (10 February 1987 – 5 February 2009) was a Belgian professional road bicycle racer, who died in Doha in his sleep of an apparent heart attack between stages 4 and 5 of the 2009 Tour of Qatar. Nolf was born in Kortrijk. He was a friend of cyclist Wouter Weylandt, who died two years after Nolf, in a racing accident in May 2011.
