= Curaçao National Road Championships =

National road cycling championships in Curaçao

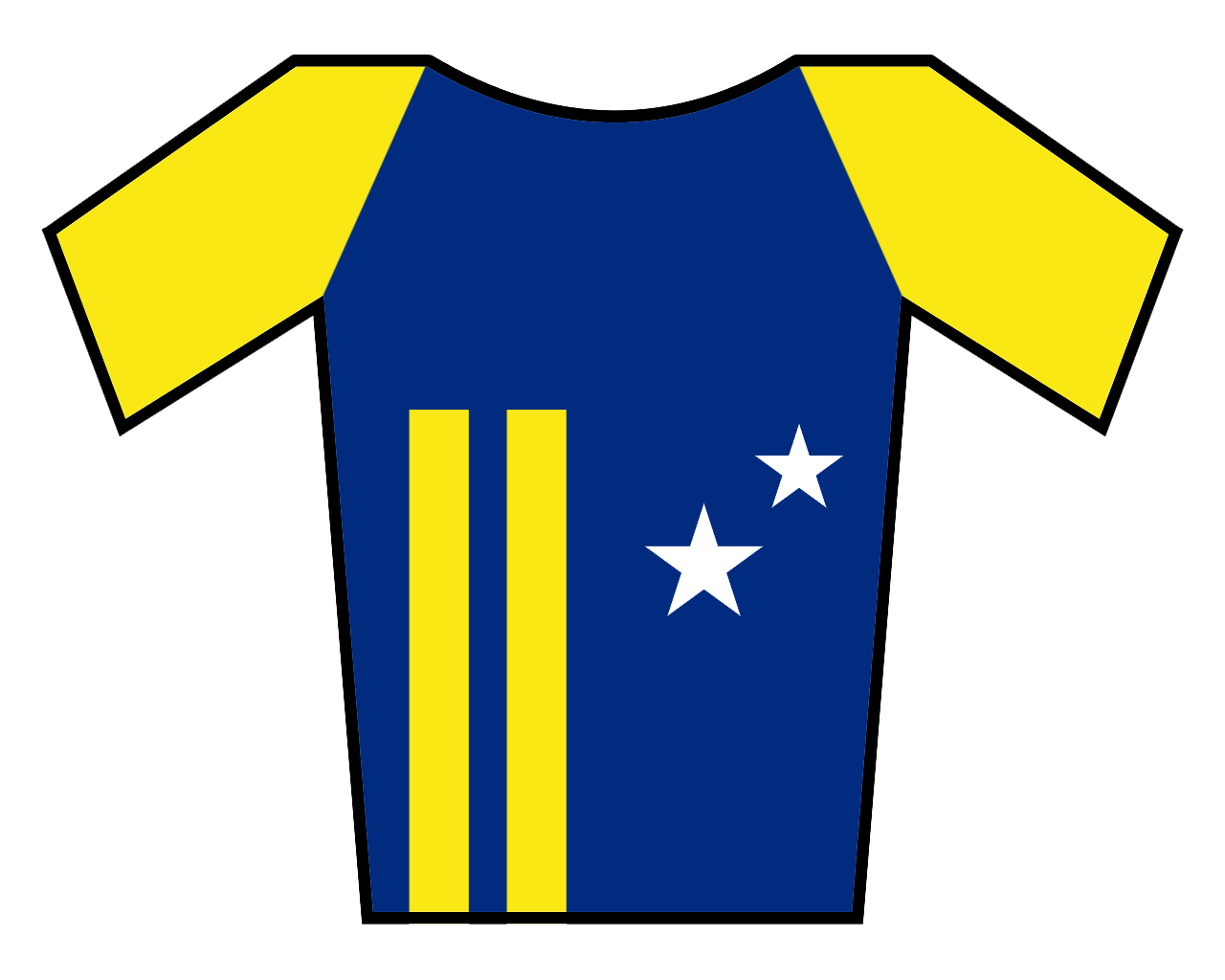

Race details
- Date: June
- Discipline: Road
- Type: One-day race

The Curaçao National Road Championships are held annually to decide the cycling champions in both the road race and time trial discipline, across various categories.

== Men ==
=== Road race ===
Year	Winner	Second	Third
2011	Marc de Maar	Ruiggeri Pinedoe	Wilfrid Camelia
2012	Marc de Maar	Wilfrid Camelia	Sebastiaan Ton
2013	Luis Javier Martinez	Jendelo Paula	Jarizinho Beker
2014	Manuel Seintje	Wilfrid Camelia	Faisel Camelia
2016	Quinten Winkel	Hillard Cijntje	Gijs Hendriks

=== Time trial ===
Year	Winner	Second	Third
2011	Marc de Maar	Wilfred Camelia	Timothy Lampe
2012	Marc de Maar	Quinten Winkel	Barry Bakker
2013	Jendelo Paula	Manuel Seintje	Wilfred Camelia
2014	Hillard Cijntje	Faisel Camelia	Wilfrid Camelia
2015	Jasper Kiburg	Reynaldo Mosquea	Stijn Watkis
2016	Quinten Winkel	Hillard Cijntje	Gijs Hendriks

== Women ==
Year	Road Race	Time Trial
2011	Gerda Fokker	Gerda Fokker
2012	Gerda Fokker	Gerda Fokker
2013	Lisa Groothuesheidkamp	Lisa Groothuesheidkamp
2014	Lisa Groothuesheidkamp	Marlies Kort (Netherlands)
2015		Marlies Kort (Netherlands)
2019	Lisa Groothuesheidkamp	Lisa Groothuesheidkamp
