= 2004 Hel van het Mergelland =

Race details
- Dates: 3 April 2004
- Stages: 1
- Distance: 191.8 km (119.2 mi)
- Winning time: 5h 03' 08"

Results
	Winner	Allan Johansen (DEN)
	Second	David Kopp (GER)
	Third	Jens Heppner (GER)

The 2004 Hel van het Mergelland was the 31st edition of the Volta Limburg Classic cycle race and was held on 3 April 2004. The race started and finished in Eijsden. The race was won by Allan Johansen.

== General classification ==
Final general classification

Rank	Rider	Time
1	Allan Johansen (DEN)	5h 03' 08"
2	David Kopp (GER)	+ 8"
3	Jens Heppner (GER)	+ 21"
4	Jos Lucassen (NED)	+ 32"
5	Joost Posthuma (NED)	+ 48"
6	Stefan Kupfernagel (GER)	+ 1' 31"
7	Enrico Poitschke (GER)	+ 1' 31"
8	Marc de Maar (NED)	+ 1' 33"
9	Piet Rooijakkers (NED)	+ 1' 33"
10	Theo Eltink (NED)	+ 1' 33"
