= Marc de Maar =

Curaçaoan road bicycle racer

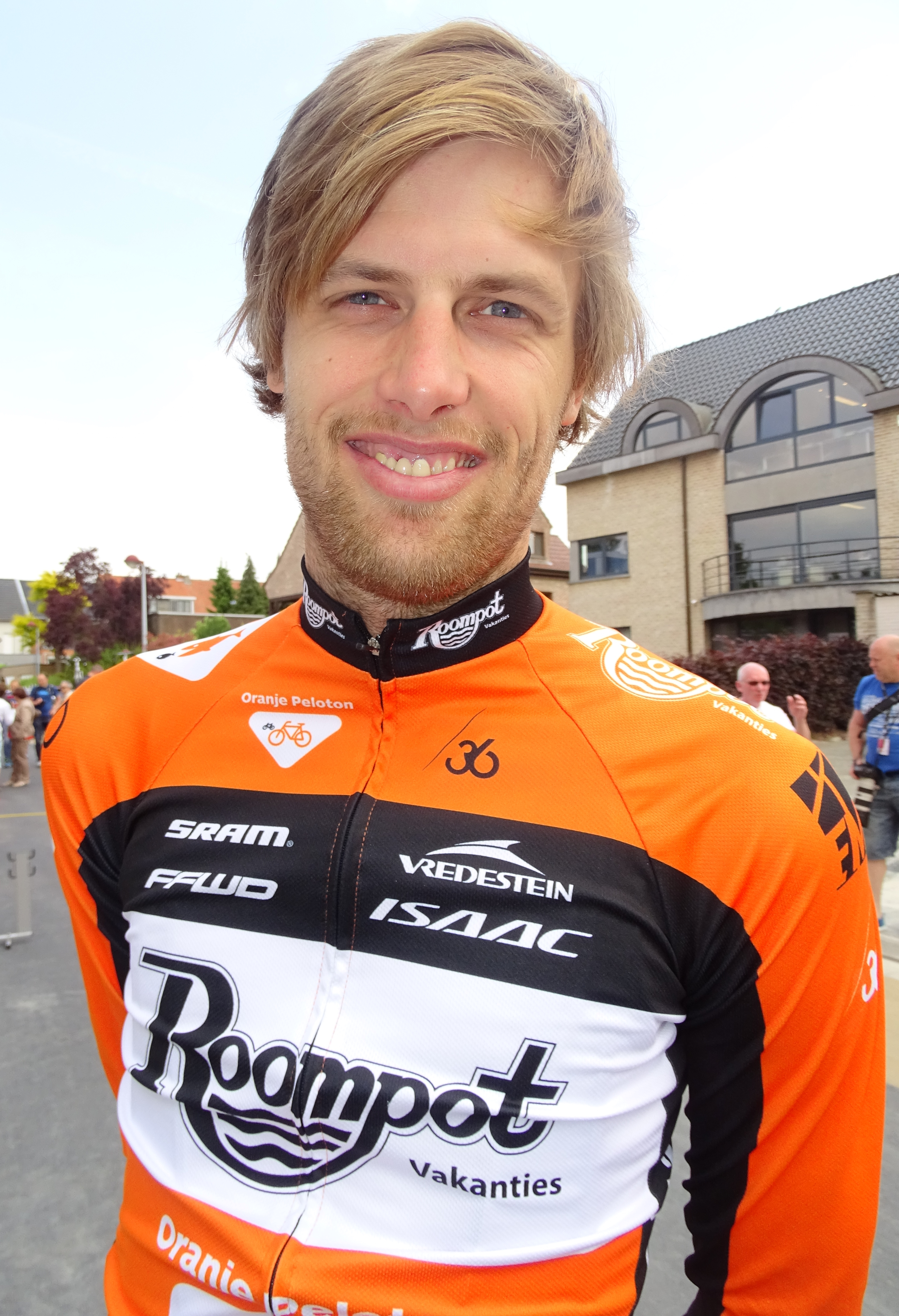
- De Maar in 2015

Personal information
- Full name: Marc de Maar
- Born: 15 February 1984 (age 42) Assen, the Netherlands
- Height: 1.82 m (6 ft 0 in)
- Weight: 68 kg (150 lb)

Cycling career
- Sport: Cycling
- Current team: Retired
- Discipline: Road
- Role: Rider

Amateur teams
- 2001–2002: Rabobank Beloften
- 2003: Cycling Team Löwik–Tegeltoko
- 2004–2005: Rabobank GS3

Professional teams
- 2006–2009: Rabobank
- 2010: UnitedHealthcare–Maxxis
- 2011: Quick-Step
- 2012–2014: UnitedHealthcare
- 2015–2016: Team Roompot
- 2017: Hengxiang Cycling Team
- 2018: Team UKYO
Medal record
Representing Netherlands Antilles
Men's road cycling
Pan American Games
| Gold medal – first place | 2011 Guadalajara | Road race |

Marc de Maar (born 15 February 1984) is a Curaçaoan former professional road racing cyclist, who rode professionally between 2006 and 2018.

== Biography ==
=== Amateur career ===
At the age of 14, de Maar was ice skating in the winter and cycling in the summer, with better results in cycling. In 2000, de Maar won some criteriums in the Netherlands, and signed a youth contract for two years for Rabobank Beloften.

In his first year as a junior for that team, de Maar won some races, and finished 18th in the World Road race championship for young riders. The second year was not so good, and after his contract ended in 2002, he did not get a new contract.

De Maar found a different team, "Löwik-Tegeltoko". In 2003, he performed better, although he had no victories. Still, the Rabobank team decided to sign him again.

In 2004 and 2005 he rode in the Rabobank GS3. In those years, he won some races, and in 2006 he became a member of the professional division of Rabobank.

=== Professional career ===
De Maar signed with Quick-Step for the 2011 season, but moved to UnitedHealthcare for the 2012 season.

In the 2012 Tour of Britain, de Maar took the victory on the fifth stage. With 9 kilometres (5.6 mi) left, he hit the tarmac with two other riders after taking a corner too wide. He slowly picked himself up, got back on his bike and reintegrated the group. He rode away solo 6.5 kilometres (4.0 mi) from the finish, and crossed the line with an advantage of 15 seconds on the chasers.

In September 2014 it was announced that de Maar would join the new Team Roompot squad for 2015.

== Major results ==
1999
1st Classique del Alpes U19
2003
3rd Overall Triptyque Ardennais
6th Circuit de Wallonie
8th Rund um den Henninger Turm U23
9th Overall Flèche du Sud
2004
1st Rund um den Henninger Turm U23
1st Hasselt–Spa–Hasselt
2nd Internatie Reningelst
3rd Overall Thüringen Rundfahrt der U23
8th Road race, UCI Under-23 Road World Championships
8th Hel van het Mergelland
9th Overall Giro d'Abruzzo
2005
1st Overall Tour du Loir-et-Cher

1st Stage 3

1st Overall Le Triptyque des Monts et Châteaux
Olympia's Tour

1st Prologue & Stage 8

1st Stage 2 Tour de Gironde
5th Grand Prix de la Ville de Lillers
9th Ronde van Drenthe
2008
6th Trofeo Sóller
2009
7th Overall Tour of Hainan
2010
Netherlands Antilles Road Championships

1st Road race
1st Time trial

3rd Overall Tour de Beauce

1st Stages 3 & 5

5th Chrono de Gatineau
2011
1st Road race, Pan American Games
Curaçao National Road Championships

1st Road race
1st Time trial

2012
Curaçao National Road Championships

1st Road race
1st Time trial

1st Stage 5 Tour of Britain
2nd Amstel Curaçao Race
4th Overall Tour of the Gila
5th Volta Limburg Classic
6th Overall Tour de Beauce
Pan American Road Championships

7th Road race
8th Time trial

2013
1st Stage 5 Tour de Beauce
3rd Amstel Curaçao Race
8th Volta Limburg Classic
10th Les Boucles du Sud Ardèche
2014
1st Mountains classification Tour of Turkey
2nd Overall Tour of Norway

1st Stage 2

7th Overall Tour de San Luis
7th Overall Tour des Fjords
2015
2nd Overall Tour de Luxembourg
5th Trofeo Serra de Tramuntana
2017
5th Overall Tour of China I
6th Overall Tour of Hainan
2018
1st Overall Tour de Kumano

1st Points classification
1st Mountains classification
