= Wouter Weylandt =

Belgian road bicycle racer

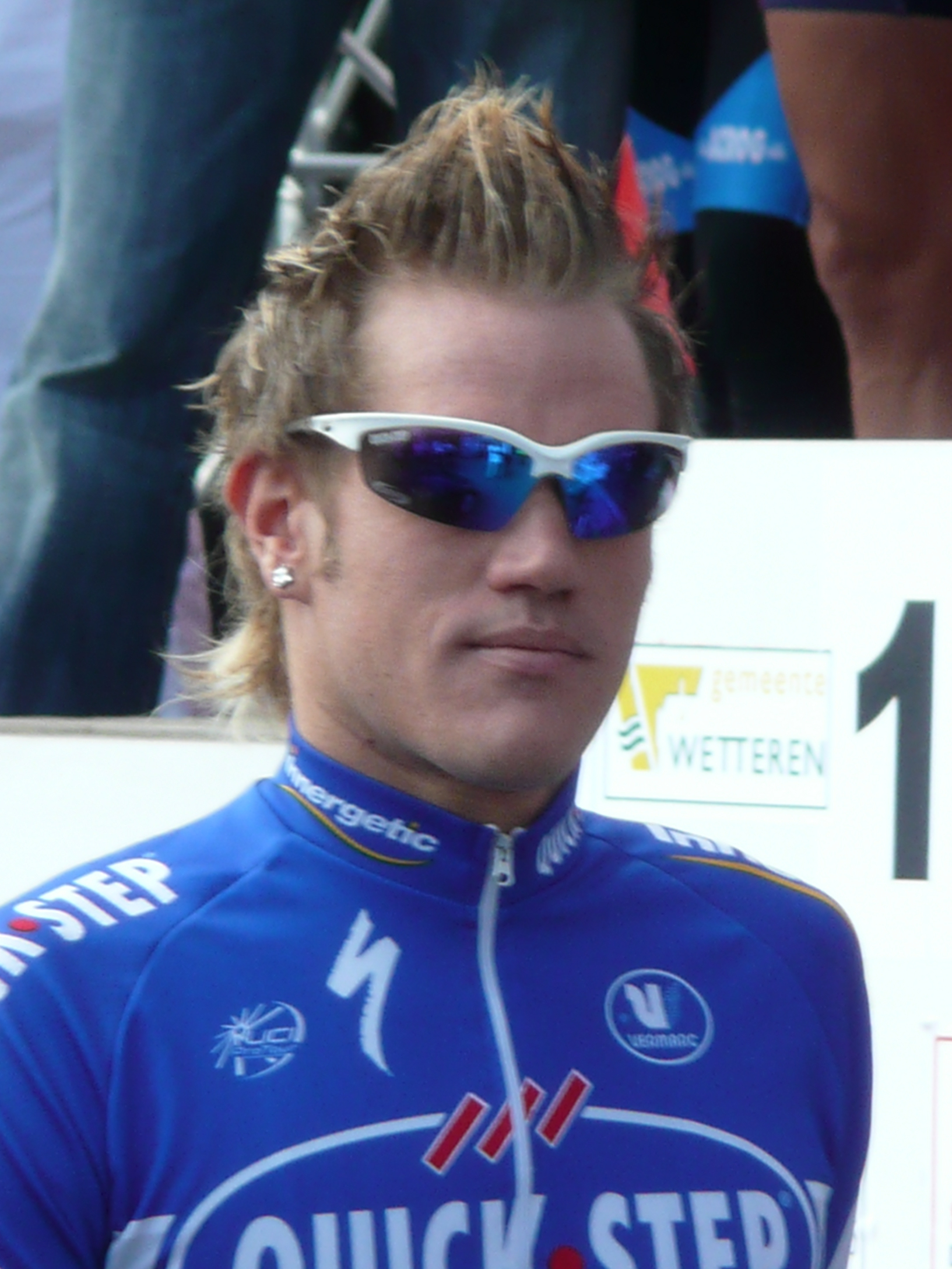
- Weylandt in Wetteren, Belgium, 2007

Personal information
- Full name: Wouter Weylandt
- Born: 27 September 1984 Ghent, Belgium
- Died: 9 May 2011 (aged 26) Mezzanego, Italy
- Height: 1.84 m (6 ft 0 in)
- Weight: 72 kg (159 lb)

Cycling career
- Sport: Cycling
- Discipline: Road
- Role: Rider
- Rider type: Sprinter

Professional teams
- 2004–2010: Quick-Step–Davitamon
- 2011: Leopard Trek

Major wins
- Grand Tours Giro d'Italia 1 individual stage (2010) Vuelta a España 1 individual stage (2008)

Wouter Weylandt (27 September 1984 – 9 May 2011) was a Belgian professional cyclist for UCI ProTeam Quick-Step–Davitamon and later for Leopard Trek. His first major win was the 17th stage of the 2008 Vuelta a España. He also won the third stage of the 2010 Giro d'Italia. He died in a crash during the third stage of the 2011 Giro d'Italia.

== Career ==
In September 2004, Wouter Weylandt became a member of the team Quick-Step–Davitamon, participating in the Memorial Rik Van Steenbergen, Grote Prijs Jef Scherens and Circuit Franco-Belge, where he took twelfth place. He was part of the Belgian team in the under-23 category at the 2005 UCI Road World Championships.

Weylandt turned professional for Quick-Step–Innergetic in 2005, but this first professional season was marred by mononucleosis detected at the beginning of the year. Towards the end of the season, he won the GP Briek Schotte, and finished fifth at the Memorial Rik Van Steenbergen event and the National Award, demonstrating his excellent sprinting qualities.

In 2006, his first full season, he finished fifth in the Three Days of West Flanders, then second in the Nokere Koerse, where he won the bunch sprint behind Bert Roesems. During this season, he failed to achieve any victories, apart from the small GP Vichte, but showed great consistency in the sprint, in particular, winning the points classification of the Tour of Poland and finishing fifth in the Championship of Flanders.

In 2007, Weylandt won further victories. In March, he won a stage of the Three Days of West Flanders, which he finished second overall, 5 seconds behind Jimmy Casper. Two weeks later, he won the Tour of Groene Hart, then finished fourth in the Grand Prix de l'Escaut. On good form, he won three more stage wins during the rest of the season in the Tour of Belgium, the Ster Elektrotoer and the Eneco Tour. Finally, during the Tour of Poland, he took advantage of a good performance with his team in the team time trial of the 1st stage to take the leader's yellow jersey for a day.

2008 began just as well for Weylandt. He won the sprint in Nokere Koerse, and finished second in the Tour of the Groene Hart, defeated by Tomas Vaitkus. In April came one of the best performances of his career on the one-day races, finishing third in the classic Gent–Wevelgem behind Óscar Freire and Aurelien Clerc after a fierce sprint. Late in the 2008 season, Weylandt took part in the Vuelta a España, his first grand tour. He participated as lead-out rider for team leader Tom Boonen, but when he dropped out Weylandt seized his chance and won the 17th stage in Valladolid. Building on the momentum of this victory, he took his fourth win of the season on the Omloop van de Vlaamse Scheldeboorden two weeks later.

Following the death of his friend Frederiek Nolf at the Tour of Qatar in February 2009, Weylandt won two more victories early in the season. He won the Memorial José Samyn race after a breakaway with Rémi Cusin, and four days later, he won another stage of the Three Days of West Flanders. He finished eleventh in Paris–Roubaix in April.

In the absence of satisfactory results in late 2009 and early 2010, he was publicly criticized by the Quick Step manager Patrick Lefevere. In May, he won the sprint of the third stage of the Tour of Italy. Suffering from gastroenteritis requiring hospitalization, he left the race a few days later.

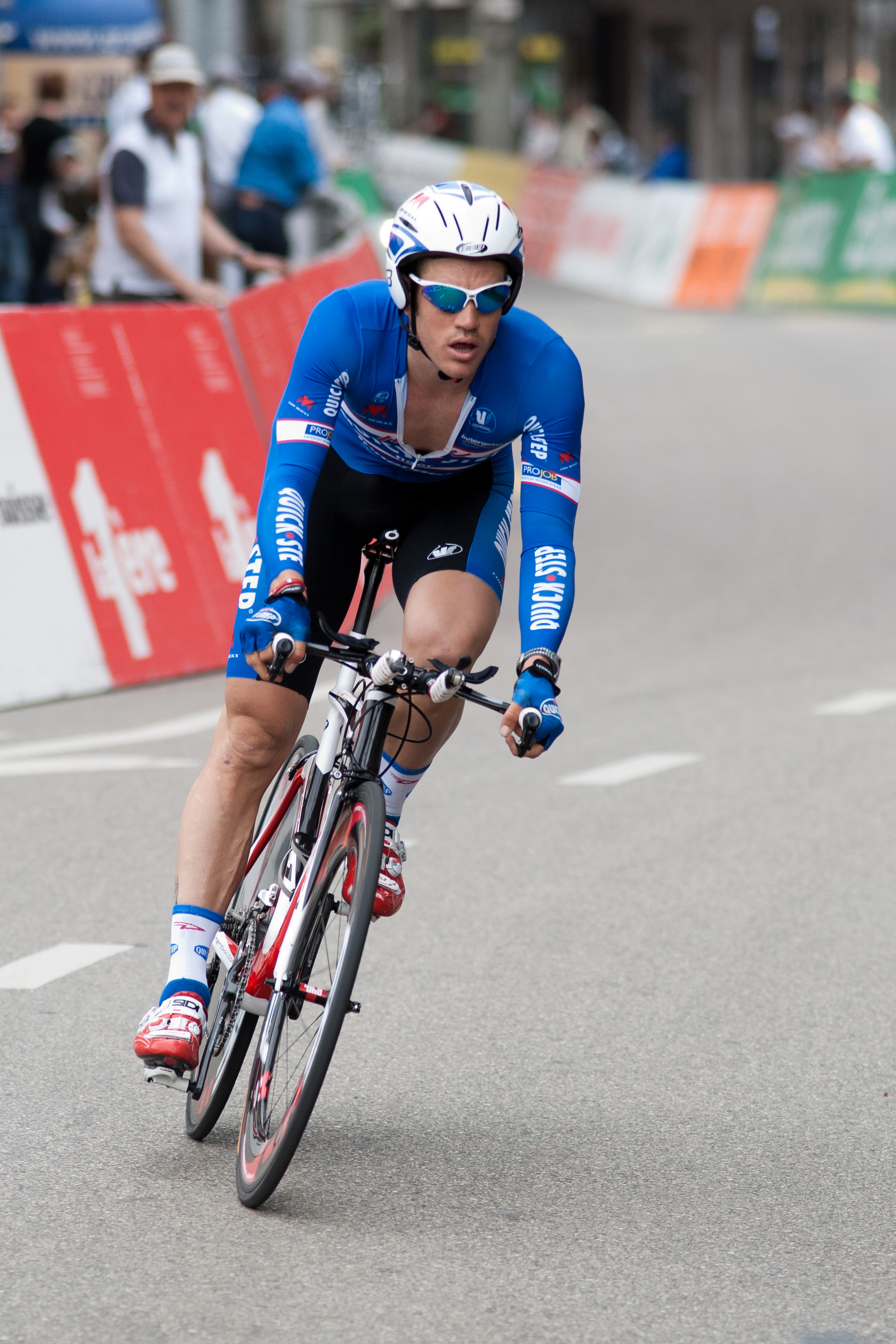
Weylandt during the 2010 Tour de Romandie

Although his contract at Quick-Step was not renewed, he gained a contract with another UCI ProTeam squad, the newly formed Leopard Trek. He was the second ranked sprinter on the squad, behind Daniele Bennati, and was placed in the team's squad for the 2011 Giro d'Italia as Bennati's lead-out rider. Bennati dropped out of the race line-up a few days before the start, meaning Weylandt entered the contest as the team's main sprinter.

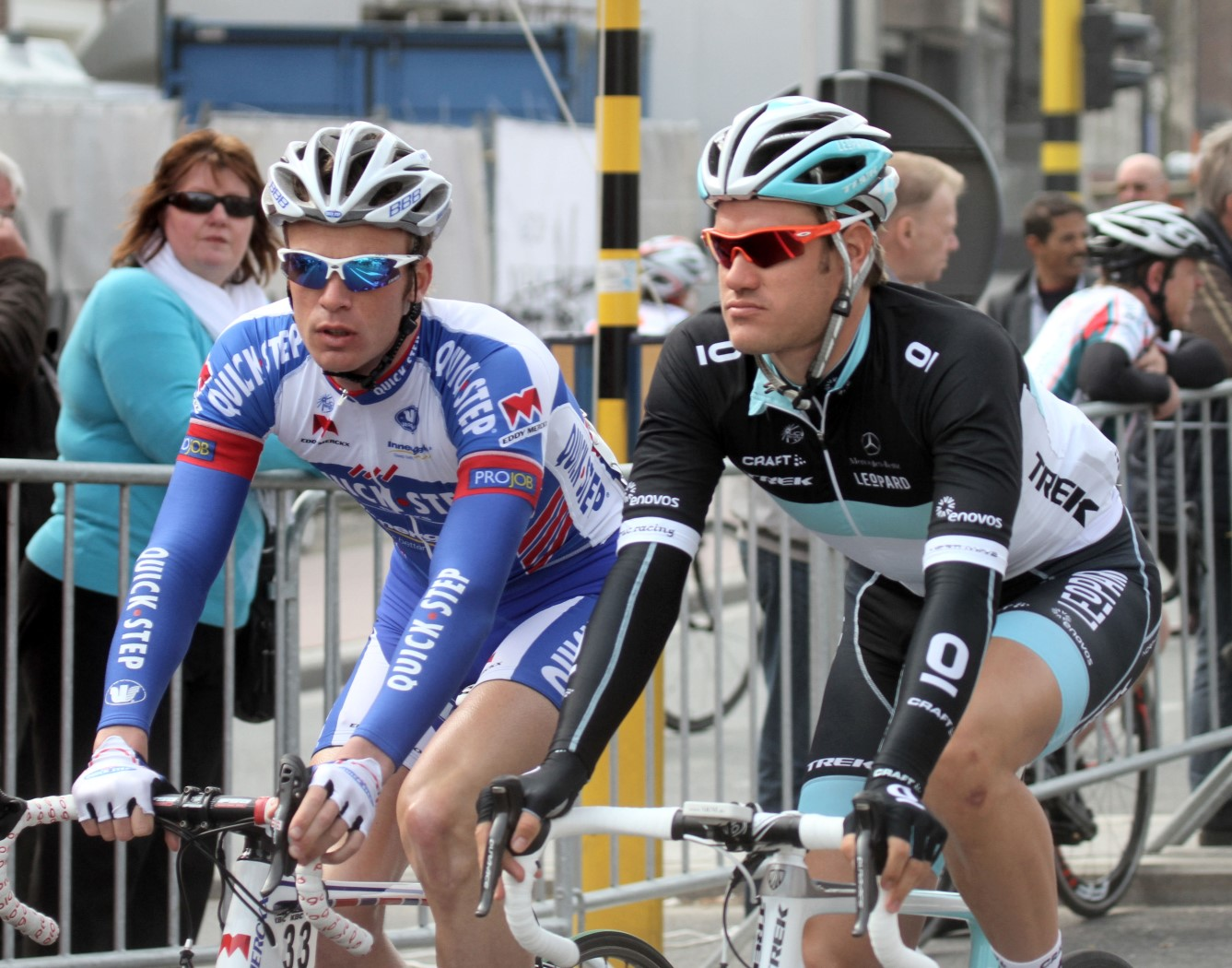
Iljo Keisse and Weylandt during the 2011 E3 Prijs Vlaanderen

== Death ==
In stage 3 of the 2011 Giro d'Italia, Weylandt crashed while descending the Passo del Bocco, in the frazione Isola di Borgonovo, municipality of Mezzanego, suffering a fatal injury. With some 17 km of the stage remaining, riders were going downhill in the final part of the descent, Weylandt trailing the main peloton, going perhaps 80 km/h (50 mph). According to Manuel Antonio Cardoso (a Team RadioShack rider who was trailing Weylandt), Weylandt looked back over his left shoulder at other riders before a slight left bend. Weylandt lost control and hit the leading edge of a low concrete guard rail on the left side of the road with his foot and pedal. He was thrown to the right side of the road, where he hit another obstacle.

The medical chief of staff of the Giro, Dr. Tredici, was right behind the accident in a service car and reported that he ran to Weylandt less than 20 seconds after the crash but, he said on Sky News, "...he was already and clearly dead upon impact. I had never seen such a thing before, such a sudden death." Tredici also reported about the very severe trauma Weylandt's contact with the wall had caused him: had Weylandt survived, injuries to his left foot and lower leg would likely have necessitated their amputation. The Giro d'Italia medical team and Garmin's team doctor performed resuscitation attempts for around 45 minutes, drying Weylandt's lungs, infusing liquids to counteract his large blood loss, and administering adrenaline and atropine to support and restart his heart beat and respiration. Meanwhile, an emergency team was rushing to the incident by helicopter. Upon their arrival, Weylandt was declared dead at the scene due to facial and basal skull fractures, as his injuries were too severe to allow resuscitation. It was determined that his heart had stopped immediately upon impact. Forensic exams the next day found extensive internal organ damage. This autopsy confirmed that the cyclist was "dead on the spot and did not suffer." Weylandt was wearing a helmet, as all professional road cyclists have been obliged to do since May 2003.

Weylandt was the fourth rider to die in the history of the Giro d'Italia.

Weylandt was survived by his girlfriend, An-Sophie, who, at the time of the crash, was five months pregnant with the couple's first child. Their daughter was born in September 2011.

=== Tributes ===
In tribute to Weylandt, the following day's stage of the race was neutralized, with teams taking turns to ride in front, and all riders wearing black armbands. A Bersaglieri band performed "Il Silenzio" at the beginning of the stage, while supporters held up condolence messages and replicas of Weylandt's race number, 108, as a token of respect along the route. Church bells tolled in mourning all along the stage. The Leopard Trek team was allowed to cross the finish line first, along with Weylandt's training partner Tyler Farrar, riding for Garmin–Cervélo, who linked arms as they finished the race. Farrar withdrew completely from the race at the finish of the stage and the next day the whole Leopard Trek team also announced their withdrawal. Weylandt's race number 108 has been retired from use in the Giro. On 4 July 2011, Farrar formed a two-handed 'W' as he crossed the line to win the third stage of the Tour de France, again as a tribute to Weylandt.

Before the start of the third stage of the 2012 Giro d'Italia, a short ceremony was held and a minute's silence was observed.

On 9 May 2013, the second anniversary of Weylandt's accident, the winner of the 6th stage of the 2013 Giro d'Italia, Mark Cavendish, held aloft Weylandt's race number, 108, in remembrance while standing on the victor's podium.

On the 14th anniversary of Weylandt's death, Mads Pedersen dedicated his win of the first stage of the 2025 Giro d'Italia to Weylandt's memory.

== Major results ==
2005
6th Overall Circuit Franco-Belge
9th Grand Prix de Fourmies
2006
1st Points classification Tour de Pologne
2nd Nokere Koerse
5th Overall Driedaagse van West-Vlaanderen
5th Kampioenschap van Vlaanderen
7th Halle–Ingooigem
7th Grand Prix Pino Cerami
2007
1st Ronde van het Groene Hart
1st Stage 1 Tour of Belgium
1st Stage 2 Ster Elektrotoer
1st Stage 5 Eneco Tour
2nd Overall Driedaagse van West-Vlaanderen

1st Stage 3

4th Scheldeprijs
6th Veenendaal–Veenendaal
8th Nationale Sluitingprijs
10th Overall Circuit Franco-Belge
2008
1st Stage 17 Vuelta a España
1st Nokere Koerse
1st Omloop van de Vlaamse Scheldeboorden
2nd Ronde van het Groene Hart
3rd Gent–Wevelgem
5th Overall Circuit Franco-Belge
6th Dutch Food Valley Classic
8th Scheldeprijs
2009
1st Le Samyn
1st Stage 3 Driedaagse van West-Vlaanderen
9th Dwars door Vlaanderen
10th Paris–Roubaix
2010
1st Stage 3 Giro d'Italia
1st Stage 4 Circuit Franco-Belge
2nd Nationale Sluitingsprijs
5th Scheldeprijs
5th Omloop van het Houtland
8th Paris–Tours
2011
9th Rund um Köln
