= Federico Canuti =

Italian racing cyclist

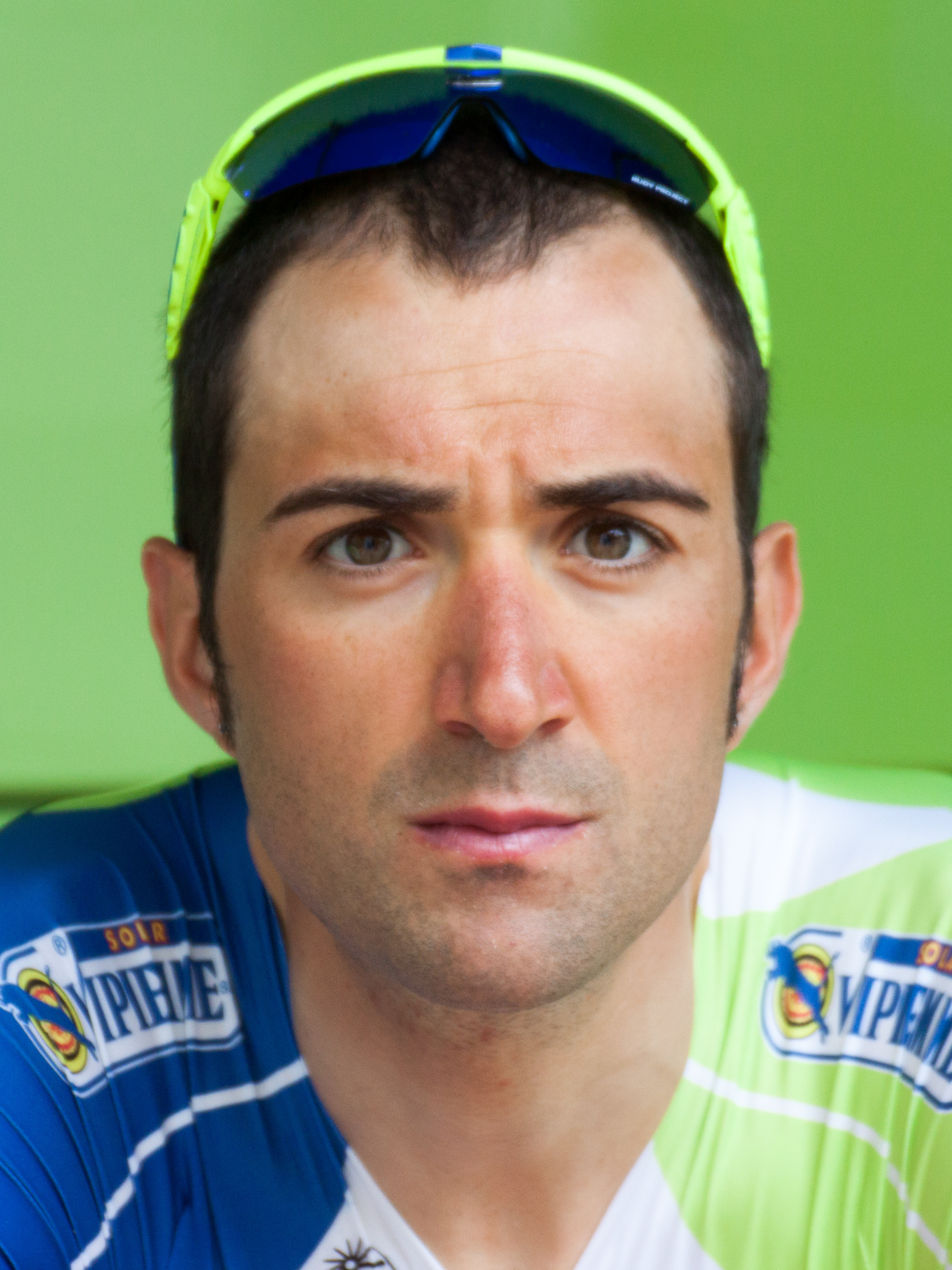
- Canuti at the 2012 Critérium du Dauphiné

Personal information
- Full name: Federico Canuti
- Nickname: Kaiser
- Born: 30 August 1985 (age 41) Pesaro, Italy
- Height: 1.82 m (6 ft 0 in)
- Weight: 68 kg (150 lb)

Cycling career
- Sport: Cycling
- Discipline: Road
- Role: Rider

Amateur team
- 2007: Bedogni Natalini Gruppo Praga Monsummanese

Professional teams
- 2008–2011: CSF Group–Navigare
- 2012–2013: Liquigas–Cannondale
- 2017: D'Amico Utensilnord

Federico Canuti (born 30 August 1985) is an Italian former professional road bicycle racer, who rode professionally between 2008 and 2013 for the Colnago–CSF Inox and Cannondale teams, and in 2017 for the D'Amico Utensilnord team.

Canuti was named a member of the Liquigas–Cannondale team for the 2012 Tour de France, making his début in the race.

After retiring from professional cycling, Canuti set up a cycling apparel brand, Kaiser KR Clothing.

== Major results ==
2006
1st Giro Valli Aretine
2007
1st GP Due Paesi in Festa
1st Trofeo Pedalata Elettrica
1st Stage 4 Giro della Toscana
2nd GP Pretola
2nd Trofeo Società Ciclistica Corsanico
2nd Trofeo Velo Club Seano
2nd La Ciociarissima
2nd Trofeo Alta Valle del Tevere
3rd Overall Giro delle Valli Cuneesi nelle Alpi del Mare
4th Coppa Città di Rosà
4th Due Giorni Marchigiana
4th Firenze–Viareggio
5th Coppa Comune di Castelfranco
5th Firenze–Empoli
2009
2nd Hel van het Mergelland
7th Giro della Romagna
2010
4th Overall Giro della Provincia di Reggio Calabria
6th Hel van het Mergelland
2011
2nd Hel van het Mergelland
6th GP Industria & Artigianato di Larciano
7th Tre Valli Varesine
8th Trofeo Matteotti
8th Gran Premio Città di Camaiore
9th Overall Giro della Provincia di Reggio Calabria

=== Grand Tour general classification results timeline ===
Grand Tour	2010	2011	2012	2013
Giro d'Italia	DNF	94	—	—
Tour de France	—	—	114	—
Vuelta a España	—	—	—	—

Legend
—	Did not compete
DNF	Did not finish
