= Craig Lewis (cyclist) =

American cyclist

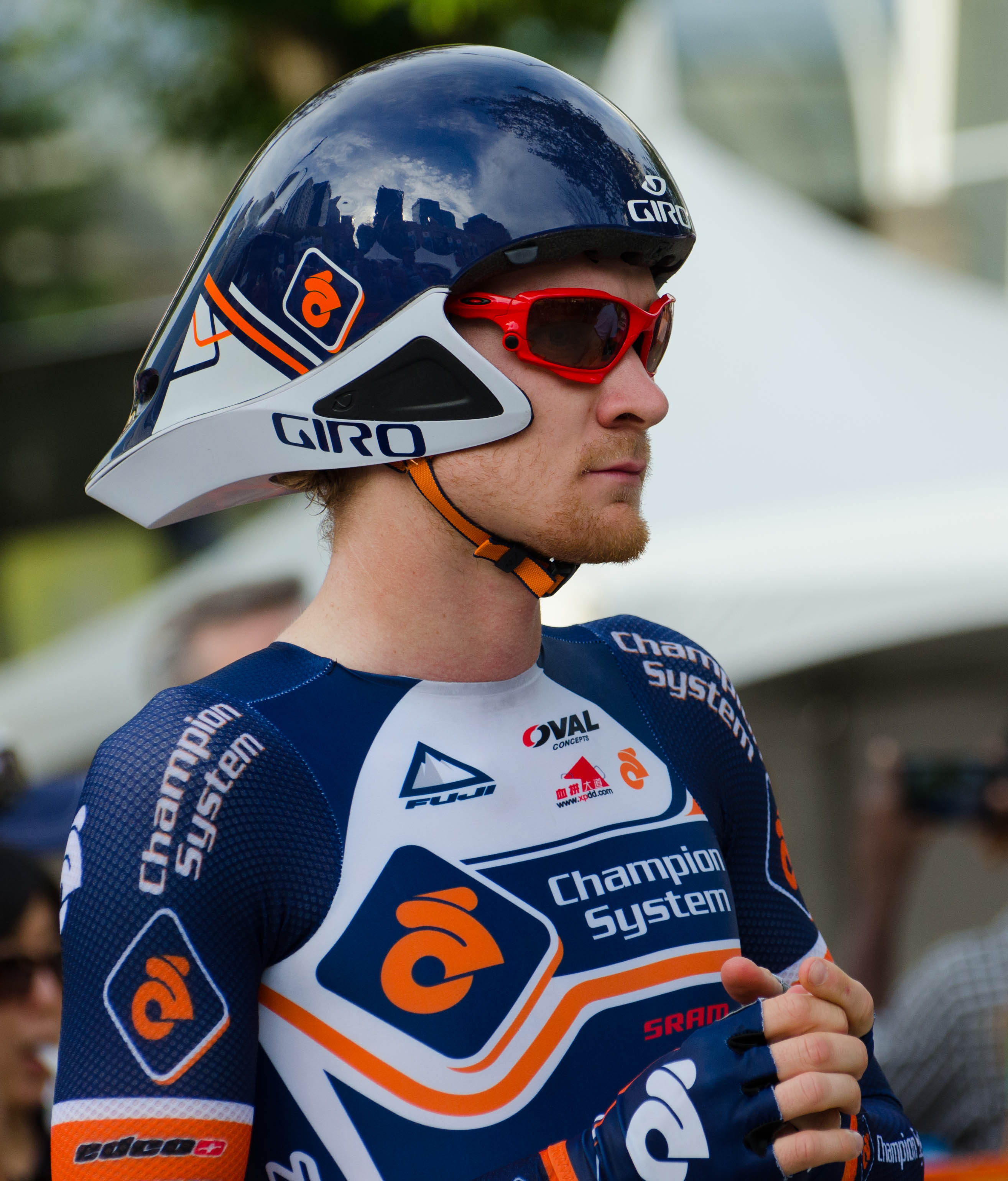
- Lewis at the 2013 Tour of Alberta

Personal information
- Born: January 10, 1985 (age 41) Moore, South Carolina, United States of America
- Height: 5 ft 10 in (1.78 m)
- Weight: 143 lb (65 kg)

Cycling career
- Sport: Cycling
- Current team: Retired
- Discipline: Road
- Role: Rider

Amateur team
- 2004–2006: TIAA–CREF

Professional teams
- 2007: Slipstream–Chipotle
- 2008–2011: Team High Road
- 2012–2013: Champion System

Craig Lewis (born January 10, 1985) is an American former professional road bicycle racer, who competed professionally between 2007 and 2013.

In 2004, while riding for TIAA–CREF – then a small team on the US circuit that would later grow to be one of the world's biggest, currently known as EF Education–EasyPost – Lewis was gravely injured when he was struck by a car during an individual time trial at the Tour de Georgia. He lost consciousness, punctured both lungs, suffered severe internal bleeding, and fractured dozens of bones. After months of rehab and physical therapy, and multiple surgeries, Lewis eventually made a full recovery.

After failing to earn a contract for the 2014 season, Lewis retired in February 2014.

== Palmares ==
2006
1st Under-23 National Road Race Championships
1st Under-23 National Criterium Championships
2007
3rd Overall Tour of Bahamas
6th Overall Tour of Ireland
7th Overall Tour de l'Avenir
2009
1st Stage 3 TTT Tour de Romandie
7th Overall Tour of Ireland
2011
1st Stage 1 TTT Giro d'Italia
2012
1st Stage 2 Tour de Beauce
