= Johnny Hoogerland =

Dutch racing cyclist

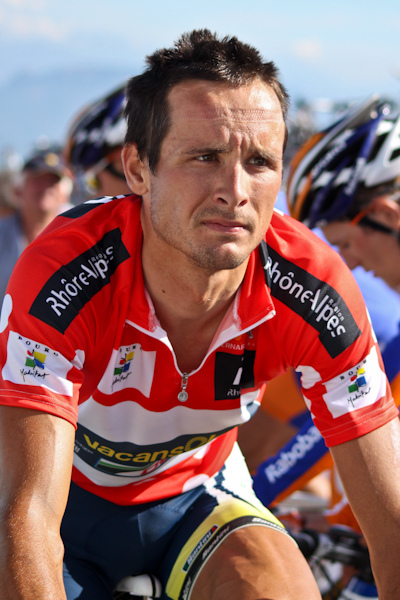
- Hoogerland at the 2011 Tour de l'Ain

Personal information
- Full name: Johnny Hoogerland
- Nicknames: Bull of Beveland, Hooligan
- Born: 13 May 1983 (age 43) Yerseke, the Netherlands
- Height: 1.79 m (5 ft 10 in)
- Weight: 70 kg (154 lb)

Cycling career
- Sport: Cycling
- Discipline: Road
- Role: Rider
- Rider type: Puncheur

Amateur teams
- 2003: Quick Step–Davitamon–Latexco
- 2025: Ho Chi Minh City Vinama

Professional teams
- 2004–2005: Van Hermet–Eurogifts
- 2006: Jartazi–7Mobile
- 2007–2008: Van Vliet–EBH Advocaten
- 2009–2013: Vacansoleil
- 2014: Androni Giocattoli–Venezuela
- 2015–2016: Team Roompot

Major wins
- National Road Race Championships (2013)

Johnny Hoogerland (born 13 May 1983) is a Dutch former professional cyclist, who rode professionally between 2004 and 2016 for the Van Hermet–Eurogifts, Jartazi–7Mobile, Van Vliet–EBH Elshof, Vacansoleil–DCM, Androni Giocattoli–Venezuela and Roompot–Oranje Peloton squads.

Due to the prominent bull-tattoo on his arm and his roots from the peninsula of Zuid-Beveland he is nicknamed the "Bull of Beveland". He had a reputation of being an aggressive rider who took part in long breakaways. His most notable victory was the overall classification of the Driedaagse van West-Vlaanderen in 2009, where he also won a stage.

Maintaining his love of the sport, post retirement, Hoogerland participated in the first UCI Gran Fondo World Championships in Scotland in 2023, as part of the inaugural UCI Cycling World Championships. Riding in the men's 40–44 years age class, Hoogerland won his career first rainbow jersey in the Gran Fondo road race. He participated in Vietnam's HTV Cup in 2025, riding for amateur team Ho Chi Minh City Vinama.

== Career ==
In 2009 Hoogerland won the Driedaagse van West-Vlaanderen, taking stage 1 along the way. He finished in 12th place in both the Tour of Flanders and the GC of the Vuelta. He was the highest placed Dutchman in the men's road race at the 2009 World Championships, finishing in 14th place overall.

At the 2011 Tour de France Hoogerland won the Mountain jersey in the 6th stage. After losing it in the 8th stage, Hoogerland managed to recapture it in the 9th stage. In that same stage, he was then involved in a dramatic crash after a fellow breakaway rider, Team Sky's Juan Antonio Flecha, was sideswiped by a France Télévisions car, causing Hoogerland to crash into a barbed wire fence. Despite deep cuts to his legs, requiring 33 stitches, Hoogerland finished the stage, losing nearly 17 minutes as a result of the crash. Flecha and Hoogerland were jointly awarded the Combativity award for the day. In November 2014 Hoogerland announced that he had reached a compensation agreement with insurance company AIG over the incident.

In early February 2013, Hoogerland collided with a car while he was training in Spain, preparing for the Tour Méditerranéen. He was hospitalized and it was announced that he suffered five fractured ribs, a bruised liver and bone fractures to his spine. It was believed that he would miss the whole classics season. On 23 June 2013 he unexpectedly won the National Championship of the Netherlands.

Hoogerland joined Androni Giocattoli–Venezuela for the 2014 season, after his previous team – Vacansoleil–DCM – folded at the end of the 2013 season.

In August 2014, Hoogerland was announced as the first signing for the new Dutch Pro-Continental Team Roompot, which formed for the 2015 season.

== Major results ==
2001
1st Junior Tour of Flanders
2003
8th Overall Olympia's Tour
2004
1st Stage 2 Ruban Granitier Breton
7th Ronde van Vlaanderen U23
2005
2nd Paris–Roubaix Espoirs
3rd Road race, National Under-23 Road Championships
3rd Brussels–Ingooigem
7th Grote Prijs Jef Scherens
8th Overall Olympia's Tour
9th Internationale Wielertrofee Jong Maar Moedig
2006
10th Ronde van Drenthe
2007
2nd Druivenkoers Overijse
8th Overall Tour de Slovaquie

1st Stage 2

2008
1st Stage 3 Clasico Ciclistico Banfoandes
3rd Overall Olympia's Tour
3rd Overall Ringerike GP
3rd Druivenkoers Overijse
4th Overall Tour de Bretagne
4th Vlaamse Pijl
4th Hel van het Mergelland
5th Overall Tour de Normandie
6th Overall Tour de Hokkaido
6th Ronde van Drenthe
7th Schaal Sels-Merksem
2009
1st Overall Driedaagse van West-Vlaanderen

1st Stage 1

4th Overall Étoile de Bessèges
5th Grand Prix d'Ouverture La Marseillaise
5th Giro di Lombardia
8th Eschborn-Frankfurt City Loop
2010
Tour de Pologne

1st Mountains classification
1st Sprints classification

2nd Grand Prix d'Ouverture La Marseillaise
3rd Overall Tour Méditerranéen
4th Druivenkoers Overijse
5th Overall Tour of Britain

1st Mountains classification

6th Halle–Ingooigem
2011
3rd Overall Étoile de Bessèges
4th Brabantse Pijl
Tour de France

Held after Stages 6–7 and 9–11
Combativity award Stage 9

2012
3rd Druivenkoers Overijse
5th Overall Tirreno–Adriatico
7th Overall Vuelta a Murcia
8th Grand Prix de Wallonie
8th Binche–Tournai–Binche
9th Overall Volta ao Algarve
2013
1st Road race, National Road Championships
1st Amstel Curaçao Race
2014
8th Prueba Villafranca de Ordizia

=== Grand Tour general classification results timeline ===
Grand Tour	2009	2010	2011	2012	2013	2014
Giro d'Italia	—	—	58	—	—	105
Tour de France	—	—	74	57	101	—
Vuelta a España	12	—	—	—	DNF	—

Legend
—	Did not compete
DNF	Did not finish

Sporting positions
Preceded by Niki Terpstra	Dutch National Road Race; Champion; 2013	Succeeded by Sebastian Langeveld
