= 2011 Giro d'Italia, Stage 12 to Stage 21 =

Cycling race stages

Overview of the stages; purple lines represent distances covered in the individual stages, while black dotted lines are the distances covered in transfers between the stages

Stage 12 of the 2011 Giro d'Italia took place on 19 May, and the race concluded on 29 May. The 2011 edition commemorated the 150th anniversary of Italian unification. The majority of the race was situated entirely within Italy – only the end of stage 13 and beginning of stage 14, in Austria, featured roads outside the home nation.

Alberto Contador entered the second half of the Giro holding the race lead, and never relinquished it. Instead, he continually added to his advantage. After no stage was second place closer to him than it had been the day before. The largest chunk of time taken in one day came in stage 13, the first of three high-mountain stages that preceded the Giro's second rest day. Contador and José Rujano finished over a minute and a half ahead of the rest of the field. Contador essentially gifted the stage win to Rujano, something he also did later in the race with his former teammate Paolo Tiralongo, since the three-minute overall advantage it gave him was already close to the largest he had ever had in a Grand Tour. He did take one stage win for himself in the second half of the Giro, the uphill individual time trial to the Nevegal.

Two stages in the second half of the Giro had their courses altered shortly before they were run. Stage 14 had been hyped as the debut of the Monte Crostis in the Giro d'Italia, but commissaries from the Union Cycliste Internationale (UCI) mandated it be removed the night before Stage 14 was run. The Giro's last stage, an individual time trial in Milan, was also shortened. Stage 15 was perhaps the queen stage, containing five high-rated climbs, including the Cima Coppi (the race's tallest climb) at the Passo Giau.

In the end, Contador won the Giro by over six minutes against Michele Scarponi, and also won the points classification. Roman Kreuziger and Stefano Garzelli won the other jersey awards.

Legend
A pink jersey	Denotes the leader of the General classification	A green jersey	Denotes the leader of the Mountains classification
A red jersey	Denotes the leader of the Points classification	A white jersey	Denotes the leader of the Young rider classification
	s.t. indicates that the rider crossed the finish line in the same group as the one receiving the time above him, and was therefore credited with the same finishing time.		

== Stage 12 ==
19 May 2011 – Castelfidardo to Ravenna, 184 km (114 mi)

This was the last flat stage, and as such was seen as likely to be the last stage in which the Giro's sprinters would take the start.

On easily the most straightforward day of racing at this year's Giro, four relatively unaccomplished riders formed the morning breakaway early in the race. Stef Clement, Michał Gołaś, Miguel Minguez, and Davide Ricci Bitti had just seven professional victories among them, all of them Clement's. Their time gap over the peloton was never more than four minutes, since the sprinters' teams, mainly HTC–Highroad, were vigilant not to let the prime opportunity go to waste. The catch was as controlled as the time gap had been for the stage, occurring with 12 km (7.5 mi) to go. HTC–Highroad drove the peloton into the final kilometers to set up their sprinter Mark Cavendish, effectively staying at the front of the field all day. With 2 km (1.2 mi) to go, a crash occurred about 15 riders deep in the peloton. Team RadioShack's sprinter Robbie Hunter lost the front wheel on his bicycle and bickered with Colnago–CSF Inox rider Sacha Modolo who had crashed near him, even though an Androni Giocattoli rider had caused the crash. While only a little more than a dozen riders actually finished together, everyone who was in the front group at the time of the crash was given the same time at the end of the stage since it took place within the stage's final 3 km (1.9 mi). HTC–Highroad executed a very strong leadout, with Lars Bak driving from 3.5 km (2.2 mi) to go before pulling off for Alex Rasmussen to do the same until a little about 600 m (2,000 ft) to go. At that point, Cavendish's favored leadout man Mark Renshaw took over, leaving the Manx sprint ace to launch from 200 m (660 ft) to go. The sprint was tight at the finish, with Team Sky's Davide Appollonio neck-and-neck with Cavendish, but the HTC–Highroad man paid off his team's efforts by taking his second win of the Giro, making them the only team to this point to win two mass-start stages. Points leader Alessandro Petacchi was third.

Stage 12 result

	Rider	Team	Time
1	Mark Cavendish (GBR)	HTC–Highroad	4h 17' 25"
2	Davide Appollonio (ITA)	Team Sky	s.t.
3	Alessandro Petacchi (ITA)	Lampre–ISD	s.t.
4	Roberto Ferrari (ITA)	Androni Giocattoli	s.t.
5	Gerald Ciolek (GER)	Quick-Step	s.t.
6	Fabio Sabatini (ITA)	Liquigas–Cannondale	s.t.
7	Manuel Belletti (ITA)	Colnago–CSF Inox	s.t.
8	Mirko Selvaggi (ITA)	Vacansoleil–DCM	s.t.
9	Mark Renshaw (AUS)	HTC–Highroad	s.t.
10	Manuel Antonio Cardoso (POR)	Team RadioShack	s.t.

General classification after stage 12

	Rider	Team	Time
1	Alberto Contador (ESP)	Saxo Bank–SunGard	44h 55' 16"
2	Kanstantsin Sivtsov (BLR)	HTC–Highroad	+ 59"
3	Vincenzo Nibali (ITA)	Liquigas–Cannondale	+ 1' 21"
4	Christophe Le Mével (FRA)	Garmin–Cervélo	+ 1' 28"
5	Michele Scarponi (ITA)	Lampre–ISD	+ 1' 28"
6	David Arroyo (ESP)	Movistar Team	+ 1' 37"
7	Roman Kreuziger (CZE)	Astana	+ 1' 41"
8	José Serpa (COL)	Androni Giocattoli	+ 1' 47"
9	Dario Cataldo (ITA)	Quick-Step	+ 2' 21"
10	Matteo Carrara (ITA)	Vacansoleil–DCM	+ 2' 21"

== Stage 13 ==
20 May 2011 – Spilimbergo to Grossglockner (Austria), 167 km (104 mi)

This was the first of three consecutive high mountain stages before the second rest day. This was the second time the Giro finished at Grossglockner, the first being 40 years prior. However, this time the race did not go to its summit, instead climbing to an elevation of 1,907 m (6,257 ft). The climb was 13 km (8.1 mi) long and averaged more than 6% gradient, with hardest sections at 14%, though the easiest part of the climb occurred right at the finish.

Several sprinters and leadout men pulled out of the Giro before this stage was run, and several more failed to complete it. A total of ten riders left the race, chief among them stage winners Mark Cavendish, Francisco Ventoso, and points leader Alessandro Petacchi. The points classification lead transferred to overall race leader Alberto Contador, with second-placed Roberto Ferrari wearing the red jersey during this stage. The race began with a flurry of attacks and counter-attacks, resulting in none going clear for quite a while. Finally, 41 km (25 mi) into the stage, 16 riders from 15 teams came free. Movistar Team was the squad to place two riders, having both Pablo Lastras and Branislau Samoilau in the group. Lastras was the best-placed rider in the group, 28th overall at just under seven minutes back of Contador. The chase was taken up not by Contador's squad Saxo Bank–SunGard but by Euskaltel–Euskadi, indicating perhaps that their leader Igor Antón was targeting the stage win.

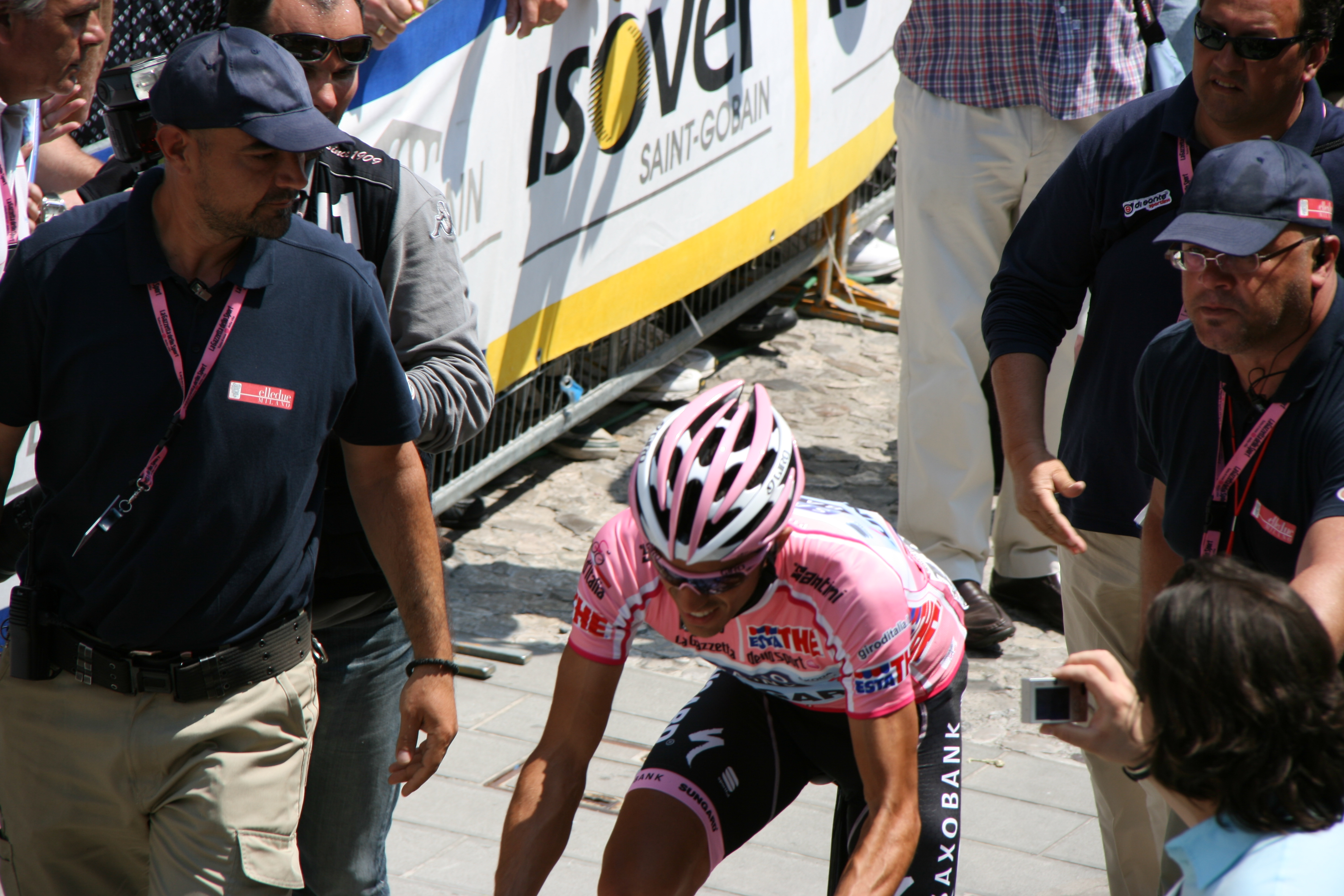
Race leader Alberto Contador after the conclusion of this stage at Grossglockner in Austria.

Samoilau won the first two climbs on the course, and as such was the leader of the mountains classification pending the conclusion of the stage. As the breakaway neared the top of the third climb, still a good 45 km (28 mi) from the finish of the stage, Robert Kišerlovski set out on the attack alone. After a short while, he attained a two-minute time gap over the rest of the morning escapees. The main field, rapidly dwindling to a select group of overall contenders and their support riders, began reabsorbing the members of the morning breakaway as the Grossglockner ascent began. Two riders from the breakaway, Cayetano Sarmiento and former race leader Pieter Weening made it to the front of the race and displaced Kiserlovski as the first man on the road with about 13 km (8.1 mi) to go. Mere minutes later, the group of overall contenders made it to the front of the race. Michele Scarponi and Igor Antón were the first riders on the attack up the Austrian peak, but neither got away. Contador then rode clear, but it was not an explosive attack like he had put in on the stage that ended at Mount Etna, rather a slow, grinding move. The only rider to have an answer was José Rujano. Again unlike the Etna stage, where Rujano struggled mightily simply to hold Contador's wheel, the two were able to work cohesively for the final 8 km (5.0 mi) of the stage and build a substantial time gap over the remainder of the field. Rujano, having lost five minutes during stage 5 earlier in the race, was an ideal ally for Contador in that had climbing prowess but was not an overall threat. The two approached the finish with the other overall contenders still a full 1 km (0.62 mi) away. Contador did not contest a sprint for the line, content to have Rujano win the stage. From behind them, the Ag2r–La Mondiale tandem of John Gadret and Hubert Dupont both rode away from the other overall contenders who Contador and Rujano left behind. Gadret crossed the line third, almost a full minute and a half down on Contador and Rujano but, with actual time and time bonus, 17 seconds better than the others.

Contador's lead in the overall standings surpassed three minutes with his gains on this stage. He was also awarded all three jerseys for which he was eligible, the pink for the general classification, the green for the mountains classification, and the red for the points classification. Due to greater losses by Kanstantsin Sivtsov and Christophe Le Mével, Vincenzo Nibali and Michele Scarponi were able to move into the top three overall, but at a significant gap to Contador.

Stage 13 result

	Rider	Team	Time
1	José Rujano (VEN)	Androni Giocattoli	4h 45' 54"
2	Alberto Contador (ESP)	Saxo Bank–SunGard	s.t.
3	John Gadret (FRA)	Ag2r–La Mondiale	+ 1' 27"
4	Hubert Dupont (FRA)	Ag2r–La Mondiale	+ 1' 29"
5	Igor Antón (ESP)	Euskaltel–Euskadi	+ 1' 29"
6	Roman Kreuziger (CZE)	Astana	+ 1' 36"
7	Michele Scarponi (ITA)	Lampre–ISD	+ 1' 36"
8	Vincenzo Nibali (ITA)	Liquigas–Cannondale	+ 1' 36"
9	Vasil Kiryienka (BLR)	Movistar Team	+ 1' 36"
10	Denis Menchov (RUS)	Geox–TMC	+ 1' 36"

General classification after stage 13

	Rider	Team	Time
1	Alberto Contador (ESP)	Saxo Bank–SunGard	49h 40' 58"
2	Vincenzo Nibali (ITA)	Liquigas–Cannondale	+ 3' 09"
3	Michele Scarponi (ITA)	Lampre–ISD	+ 3' 16"
4	David Arroyo (ESP)	Movistar Team	+ 3' 25"
5	Roman Kreuziger (CZE)	Astana	+ 3' 29"
6	Kanstantsin Sivtsov (BLR)	HTC–Highroad	+ 3' 53"
7	Igor Antón (ESP)	Euskaltel–Euskadi	+ 4' 02"
8	John Gadret (FRA)	Ag2r–La Mondiale	+ 4' 05"
9	Matteo Carrara (ITA)	Vacansoleil–DCM	+ 4' 35"
10	Hubert Dupont (FRA)	Ag2r–La Mondiale	+ 4' 38"

== Stage 14 ==
21 May 2011 – Lienz (Austria) to Monte Zoncolan, 170 km (110 mi)

As the course was originally designed, this was perhaps the Giro's single most difficult stage. The stage ends at Monte Zoncolan, visited for the fourth time in the past eight years and second year in a row. The Zoncolan is not especially tall, but it is absurdly steep, averaging a 12% gradient with sections as high as 22%. Originally, it was but the final challenge on the course as the first-category Monte Crostis, a new climb which was to be used for the first time in this year's Giro, crests 38 km (24 mi) from the finish. The Crostis is nearly as steep as the Zoncolan, and is taller, with its summit at 1,982 m (6,503 ft). Even before the Crostis were a second-category climb and two third-category climbs, leaving hardly a single kilometer of flat racing in this stage. Giro favorite Alberto Contador reconned both the Crostis and the Zoncolan climbs in the weeks before the Giro, saying that he liked the Zoncolan, but that he was afraid of the Crostis.

On the night before this stage was to be run, UCI commissaires ordered the Monte Crostis be removed from the race route. There had been talk of a rider protest on the basis of the extremely steep and poorly maintained roads the race was to go down, instigated somewhat after the death of Wouter Weylandt earlier in the race, but the UCI's decision was not on the basis of safety. Giro officials had set out a detailed protocol wherein team cars would not follow the race up or down the Crostis, and only motorbikes offering wheel changes would be present with the riders. Team managers expressed concern that they would not fully be able to fulfill their duties if not present with the riders like normal, and this was given as the basis of the UCI's decision. They held that Giro organizers had sufficiently ensured rider safety on the course, but the necessary protocols did not protect the sporting aspect of the race. Thus, the Crostis was eliminated, and the stage was reduced in length from its originally planned length of 210 km (130 mi). The resultant course was still quite hilly, and the second-category Tualis climb was added to the route for the day to offset the loss of the Crostis. However, protests from spectators disappointed by the removal of the Crostis part of the route, including many who had volunteered for works to make parts of that road safe, lead to the cancellation of the Tualis climb. The route was diverted while the stage was in progress to avoid a small village at the foot of the Tualis where protesters had gathered. Therefore, the exact distance of this stage is unknown. Race director Angelo Zomegnan had earlier insisted that the Crostis would stay in the race, but he was obligated to accept the overruling decision of cycling's governing body. Reportedly, five teams, including Lampre–ISD, Liquigas–Cannondale, and Farnese Vini–Neri Sottoli were willing to ride over and down the Crostis, but the other 17 were against it. Riders were satisfied that safety had been assured, but concurred that the sporting aspect of the race was not fairly served by only allowing a motorbike per team up the mountain. Zomegnan appeared on Italian television shortly before the stage was run and had scathing words for the teams and managers who had apparently approved the climb in October 2010 and again in March, in advance of the Giro, but lobbied for its removal at the last moment.

With Saxo Bank–SunGard leading the peloton at a relatively easy pace over the first two climbs on the course, the day's breakaway gained a lead over 10 minutes at one point. None of them – Matteo Rabottini, Bram Tankink, or Gianluca Brambilla – had particularly good climbing ability, meaning the peloton could afford to give them a large time gap. As the peloton approached the Zoncolan, Vincenzo Nibali had his teammates take to the front of the main field to quicken the pace and try to make the race selective. The time gap fell much more quickly in that time than it had when Saxo Bank–SunGard was leading the field. The breakaway still had four and a half minutes with 10 km (6.2 mi) remaining. Ordinarily, this would be enough time to assure that the day's winner would come from the lead group, but the incredibly steep pitches of the Zoncolan meant this was unlikely even with such a large time gap and little road remaining.

No cars followed the race up the Zoncolan due to the risk that they would stall on the mountain and obstruct the riders. With 7.5 km (4.7 mi) to go, Brambilla attacked from the leading group and got free to be the sole leader on the road. At the same time, Joaquim Rodríguez did the same out of the trailing group. Igor Antón and race leader Alberto Contador soon followed, and overtook Rodríguez. Michele Scarponi followed their wheels as they rode to the front of the race, easily passing up the three breakaway riders. Antón put in his own attack and succeeded in getting free, and Contador and Scarponi were subsequently able to drop Rodríguez back to the trailing group containing Nibali, Roman Kreuziger, and Denis Menchov. Nibali was eventually bridge up to Contador, and in trying to ride away from him he established himself and Contador as the second group on the road, behind Antón and ahead of Scarponi, Menchov, and John Gadret, as Kreuziger faded (eventually finishing 16th). Antón's lead was only a few seconds for most of the climb, but he stayed out front all the way to the finish line to claim the stage victory. Nibali motioned several times for Contador to take a pull at the front of their group, but the Spaniard refused. He eventually attacked Nibali near the finish line, taking second on the day seven seconds ahead of the Italian. Nibali complained after the stage that Contador's tactics were disrespectful, and revealed that he had not intended to aggressively descend the Monte Crostis should it have been raced. Contador added 11 seconds to his lead over second-placed Nibali, and Antón rose to third in the overall classification, just a single second behind Nibali. The ride achieved Antón's stated goal of a stage win, and he mused after the stage that he may try to hold onto his podium position.

Stage 14 result

	Rider	Team	Time
1	Igor Antón (ESP)	Euskaltel–Euskadi	5h 04' 26"
2	Alberto Contador (ESP)	Saxo Bank–SunGard	+ 33"
3	Vincenzo Nibali (ITA)	Liquigas–Cannondale	+ 40"
4	Michele Scarponi (ITA)	Lampre–ISD	+ 1' 11"
5	Denis Menchov (RUS)	Geox–TMC	+ 1' 21"
6	John Gadret (FRA)	Ag2r–La Mondiale	+ 1' 38"
7	Mikel Nieve (ESP)	Euskaltel–Euskadi	+ 1' 52"
8	Hubert Dupont (FRA)	Ag2r–La Mondiale	+ 1' 55"
9	Kanstantsin Sivtsov (BLR)	HTC–Highroad	+ 2' 05"
10	José Rujano (VEN)	Androni Giocattoli	+ 2' 11"

General classification after stage 14

	Rider	Team	Time
1	Alberto Contador (ESP)	Saxo Bank–SunGard	54h 45' 45"
2	Vincenzo Nibali (ITA)	Liquigas–Cannondale	+ 3' 20"
3	Igor Antón (ESP)	Euskaltel–Euskadi	+ 3' 21"
4	Michele Scarponi (ITA)	Lampre–ISD	+ 4' 06"
5	John Gadret (FRA)	Ag2r–La Mondiale	+ 5' 23"
6	Kanstantsin Sivtsov (BLR)	HTC–Highroad	+ 5' 37"
7	Denis Menchov (RUS)	Geox–TMC	+ 6' 06"
8	Hubert Dupont (FRA)	Ag2r–La Mondiale	+ 6' 12"
9	Roman Kreuziger (CZE)	Astana	+ 6' 40"
10	David Arroyo (ESP)	Movistar Team	+ 6' 43"

== Stage 15 ==
22 May 2011 – Conegliano to Gardeccia-Val di Fassa, 229 km (142 mi)

The course for the last stage prior to the second rest day was again crushingly difficult, featuring five climbs. There were three first-category climbs, one second-category climb, and the Cima Coppi climb (the name given to the highest point in the race) of the Passo Giau. Each of the four climbs prior to the summit finish featured a lengthy descent, meaning that this stage contained the most vertical climbing of any in the race. The final climb to Val di Fassa features maximum gradients of 16%.

The stage began with a group of seven coming clear of the peloton. This group included Yaroslav Popovych, who had made several breaks earlier in the race and therefore led the Trofeo Fuga Pinarello classification for most kilometers spent in a breakaway of ten riders or fewer. They, however, were not to stay away as the day's principal break, being brought back after 50 km (31 mi) had been raced. Eleven riders counter-attacked when the first seven were brought back. This group included former Giro winners Danilo Di Luca and Stefano Garzelli, former Tour de France winner Carlos Sastre, and former leader of this race Pieter Weening. Their advantage over the main field quickly extended to nearly ten minutes while on the slopes of the day's second climb, the Passo Cibiana. Liquigas–Cannondale took the pace at the front end of the peloton to try to set up their leader Vincenzo Nibali.

Johnny Hoogerland was the first rider to attack out of the breakaway to try to claim the Cima Coppi, and the cash prize to go with it. He attained a lead of over a minute, but Garzelli and Mikel Nieve formed a cohesive chase behind him and passed him up after a while. Garzelli went solo ahead of the Basque to claim the Passo Giau by a margin of 45 seconds. Hoogerland followed at 1'25", with the remainder of the breakaway next at 1'44". From the peloton behind, Joaquim Rodríguez and David Arroyo put in attacks that led to a selection among the race's top rider. Those two along with Michele Scarponi, Igor Antón, Denis Menchov, Roman Kreuziger, race leader Alberto Contador, and Nibali coalescing as the fourth group on the road. Nibali chose to aggressively descend the Passo Giau, nearly bridging up to Nieve. He later commented that this intensive dig was in effort to win the stage and not necessarily to distance Contador. Contador himself also put in an attack, on the Passo Fedaia which followed the Passo Giau, but neither was destined to stay away for long. Nibali in particular paid for his efforts, being gapped off from Contador's group. He chased back on once, but was unable to keep Contador's pace to the finish, losing a further minute and a half to the Spaniard at day's end.

Garzelli was also first over the Passo Fedaia, giving him maximum mountains points on three of the day's climbs. He held an advantage of six minutes over Nieve as the Gardeccia climb began, but he was spent from his efforts and was passed up by Nieve with 5.7 km (3.5 mi) to go. Nieve continuously built his advantage as the grueling final climb wore on, winning the stage by nearly two minutes over Garzelli, who narrowly held on for second against a fast-charging Contador. Garzelli took over leadership in the mountains classification with the day's results, with a commanding 23-point lead over Nieve. For his part, Nieve's ride propelled him into fifth in the overall classification. Contador further padded his already sizeable lead, now holding over four minutes against Scarponi with no other rider inside five minutes.

Stage 15 result

	Rider	Team	Time
1	Mikel Nieve (ESP)	Euskaltel–Euskadi	7h 27' 14"
2	Stefano Garzelli (ITA)	Acqua & Sapone	+ 1' 41"
3	Alberto Contador (ESP)	Saxo Bank–SunGard	+ 1' 51"
4	Michele Scarponi (ITA)	Lampre–ISD	+ 1' 57"
5	John Gadret (FRA)	Ag2r–La Mondiale	+ 2' 28"
6	José Rujano (VEN)	Androni Giocattoli	+ 2' 35"
7	Vincenzo Nibali (ITA)	Liquigas–Cannondale	+ 3' 34"
8	Joaquim Rodríguez (ESP)	Team Katusha	+ 3' 34"
9	Roman Kreuziger (CZE)	Astana	+ 4' 01"
10	Steven Kruijswijk (NED)	Rabobank	+ 4' 13"

General classification after stage 15

	Rider	Team	Time
1	Alberto Contador (ESP)	Saxo Bank–SunGard	62h 14' 42"
2	Michele Scarponi (ITA)	Lampre–ISD	+ 4' 20"
3	Vincenzo Nibali (ITA)	Liquigas–Cannondale	+ 5' 11"
4	John Gadret (FRA)	Ag2r–La Mondiale	+ 6' 08"
5	Mikel Nieve (ESP)	Euskaltel–Euskadi	+ 7' 03"
6	José Rujano (VEN)	Androni Giocattoli	+ 8' 39"
7	Denis Menchov (RUS)	Geox–TMC	+ 8' 46"
8	Roman Kreuziger (CZE)	Astana	+ 8' 58"
9	Joaquim Rodríguez (ESP)	Team Katusha	+ 9' 20"
10	David Arroyo (ESP)	Movistar Team	+ 9' 30"

== Stage 16 ==
24 May 2011 – Belluno to Nevegal, 12.7 km (7.9 mi) (individual time trial)

This was another climbing time trial, similar to the stages in the 2008 and 2010 editions of the Giro which featured a race against the clock ending at the Plan de Corones. Nevegal is perhaps an easier climb than Plan de Corones, but still averages 10% gradient with its hardest section, 4 km (2.5 mi) from the top, reaching 14%.

Before the time trial began, a moment of silence was observed for Xavier Tondó, a Movistar Team rider who was killed in a freak accident at his home the day prior. Riders and team staff held a meeting at their hotel shortly after hearing the news, to discuss whether they would continue in the race. The riders unanimously voted to ride on.

Most riders used normal road bikes for this stage – very few even added the clip-on aerodynamic handlebars, which are normally standard equipment in a time trial. The first competitive time up the mountain came from Rabobank's Stef Clement, a time trial specialist. While the Nevegal climb was undoubtedly the main feature of this time trial course, it also contained a 5 km (3.1 mi) flat section at the very beginning, and a mostly flat final 2 km (1.2 mi), meaning riders best suited for time trialing would have a chance to be competitive with pure climbers. Clement was the 41st of 165 riders to take the start, and his time held as best until Tondó's teammate Branislau Samoilau finished his ride about an hour later, taking 34 seconds out of the Dutchman as the first rider on the day under 30 minutes. Samoilau was visibly overcome with emotion when being interviewed by assembled media after his ride. Shortly after, Samoilau came the top riders in the race. Mountains leader Stefano Garzelli was the next rider to post a provisional best time, coming home 13 seconds faster than Samoilau. It seemed for a while that Garzelli's time might hold up as best, since riders like Roman Kreuziger, Denis Menchov, and Joaquim Rodríguez came close but did not knock off the 2000 Giro winner. José Rujano did eventually best Garzelli, by seven seconds.

The last three men on the course were the top three men in the overall standings. Third-placed Vincenzo Nibali posted the best time at the intermediate time check, but since this time check came at 5 km (3.1 mi) and before the road went uphill, this was not necessarily indicative of his form and standing. Race leader Alberto Contador was 13th at the first time check, 13 seconds back. Nibali posted the day's best time when he crossed the finish line, five seconds better than Rujano. Second place man Michele Scarponi came very close to displacing Nibali, but was the worse of him by a single second. Nibali commented after the stage that his main ambition for the remainder of the Giro was to reclaim second place from Scarponi, essentially giving up on winning the race overall in the face of Contador's all but insurmountable advantage. Contador, per his usual riding style, rode the climb with a much higher cadence and lower gear than the other top riders in the field. He was the only rider on the day to finish within 29 minutes, stopping the clock 34 seconds faster than Nibali for a second dominant stage win in this Giro. Most of the other time gaps were close – Contador's advantage over second place was the second-biggest difference between two consecutive riders in the standings (the largest was the last and second-to-last riders, separated by 58 seconds). While no time bonuses were awarded in this stage, Contador nonetheless increased his lead yet again, now holding almost five minutes over second place. Contador's ride was not without a touch of controversy. His personal mechanic Faustino Muñoz was expelled from the race for opening the door of the car he was riding in, behind Contador, to swat at a fan he thought he was going to push Contador off his bicycle. Muñoz was barred from attending any of the further stages, though he was permitted to stay with the team and work on Contador's bicycle before and after the stages. Contador downplayed reports of the Italian fans being harsh with him, saying he had "no problem with the tifosi." Contador immediately dedicated his win to Tondó on the podium after the stage. He, like many riders, had worn a black armband to memorialize Tondó.

Stage 16 result

	Rider	Team	Time
1	Alberto Contador (ESP)	Saxo Bank–SunGard	28' 55"
2	Vincenzo Nibali (ITA)	Liquigas–Cannondale	+ 34"
3	Michele Scarponi (ITA)	Lampre–ISD	+ 38"
4	José Rujano (VEN)	Androni Giocattoli	+ 39"
5	Stefano Garzelli (ITA)	Acqua & Sapone	+ 46"
6	Roman Kreuziger (CZE)	Astana	+ 49"
7	Denis Menchov (RUS)	Geox–TMC	+ 52"
8	Marco Pinotti (ITA)	HTC–Highroad	+ 58"
9	Branislau Samoilau (BLR)	Movistar Team	+ 59"
10	Vladimir Miholjević (CRO)	Acqua & Sapone	+ 1' 04"

General classification after stage 16

	Rider	Team	Time
1	Alberto Contador (ESP)	Saxo Bank–SunGard	62h 43' 37"
2	Michele Scarponi (ITA)	Lampre–ISD	+ 4' 58"
3	Vincenzo Nibali (ITA)	Liquigas–Cannondale	+ 5' 45"
4	John Gadret (FRA)	Ag2r–La Mondiale	+ 7' 35"
5	José Rujano (VEN)	Androni Giocattoli	+ 9' 18"
6	Mikel Nieve (ESP)	Euskaltel–Euskadi	+ 9' 22"
7	Denis Menchov (RUS)	Geox–TMC	+ 9' 38"
8	Roman Kreuziger (CZE)	Astana	+ 9' 47"
9	Joaquim Rodríguez (ESP)	Team Katusha	+ 10' 25"
10	Igor Antón (ESP)	Euskaltel–Euskadi	+ 10' 58"

== Stage 17 ==
25 May 2011 – Feltre to Tirano, 230 km (140 mi)

Two frequently used Giro climbs featured in this course, the Passo del Tonale and the Aprica. The finish, however, came on the descent from the Aprica with a flat final 7.2 km (4.5 mi), so pre-race analysis found it unlikely that the overall favorites would be a factor on this stage. This stage was originally designed to be 16 km (9.9 mi) longer and end at Sondrio, but safety concerns led to the alterations in the course.

After over an hour of racing, ridden at a fast speed of 48 km/h (30 mph), 15 riders from 13 teams came clear of the peloton. Farnese Vini–Neri Sottoli and Team Katusha were both able to place two riders in the group. After a chase, Ag2r–La Mondiale's Hubert Dupont made the bridge, to make for a 16-man leading group. The group contained some riders who could conceivably threaten top-ten placings, as 12th-placed Kanstantsin Sivtsov, 15th-placed Dupont, and 16th-placed Christophe Le Mével were all up the road. This meant that race leader Alberto Contador's team Saxo Bank–SunGard could afford to pace the peloton gently, as they had nothing to lose were they to allow this group several minutes but other teams might. As such, the Liquigas–Cannondale squad came to the front end of the main field to take up the chase when the group's advantage was such that Sivtsov was in position to displace their leader Vincenzo Nibali from third place. When they successfully lowered the time gap to the point where Nibali's position was no longer in jeopardy, they gave way to Geox–TMC and Euskaltel–Euskadi, working similarly to protect the high overall positions held by Denis Menchov and Mikel Nieve. These teams' efforts were not as successful, as Sivtsov's eventual tenth place on the day moved him up to fifth in the overall classification.

The hilly parcours made for attrition in the leading group, as seven eventually came free of the sixteen, and later four broke free of the seven. The main field only caught two riders from the initial group of 16, as Luca Mazzanti was the first over the line from the peloton for 15th. The four riders who remained at the front of the race to the finish were Diego Ulissi, Giovanni Visconti, Jan Bakelants, and Pablo Lastras. Bakelants had tried to solo to the finish line from 3 km (1.9 mi) out, but the other three held his wheel. Ulissi originally opened his sprint a full 1,000 m (3,300 ft) from the line, but when Bakelants covered his move he sat up and let the Belgian lead out the sprint. He launched again from 300 m (980 ft) out, at which point Bakelants sat up and faded to fourth. Visconti tried to take the line to Ulissi's left, even though Ulissi was already quite near the barricades and there was not very much room there. Ulissi then deviated from his line slightly and moved even closer to the barricades. Visconti was visibly enraged and twice took his right hand off the handlebars to shove Ulissi. Both Italians sat up just before the finish line, but Lastras was unable to come around them. Visconti crossed the finish line first, and was still shouting and gesticulating at Ulissi after the finish. Shortly after the stage, race officials stripped him of his apparent stage win and relegated him to the last position in his group, third, for irregular sprinting. The victory instead went to Ulissi, who had crossed the line second.

The two riders involved in the controversial finish later shook hands after an intense face-to-face meeting on Italian television. Visconti adamantly claimed he had done nothing wrong, and that he had shoved Ulissi to keep himself from crashing. He stated that he believed himself winner of the stage despite what the official results said, since he was strongest and fastest. He asserted that Ulissi had specifically maneuvered him to the barricades because he knew that Visconti was the faster finisher, and that Ulissi had not done his equal share of work in the breakaway. Visconti's director Luca Scinto admitted that he agreed with the decision to relegate his rider, but he felt that Ulissi also should have been relegated and the stage victory awarded to Lastras. Ulissi did not deny that he had not taken as many pulls as other riders in the breakaway, or that he had used tactics in the sprint, but he claimed that more than half of the breakaway were lax on taking pulls and that he had simply done what he needed to do to win the stage. Other than Sivtsov's leap back into the top ten, there were no changes to the top of the overall standings, since the top riders all finished together three minutes behind the leading trio.

Stage 17 result

	Rider	Team	Time
1	Diego Ulissi (ITA)	Lampre–ISD	5h 31' 51"
2	Pablo Lastras (ESP)	Movistar Team	s.t.
3	Giovanni Visconti (ITA)	Farnese Vini–Neri Sottoli	s.t.
4	Jan Bakelants (BEL)	Omega Pharma–Lotto	+ 4"
5	Fabio Taborre (ITA)	Acqua & Sapone	+ 8"
6	Eduard Vorganov (RUS)	Team Katusha	+ 8"
7	Hubert Dupont (FRA)	Ag2r–La Mondiale	+ 8"
8	Jesús Hernández (ESP)	Saxo Bank–SunGard	+ 8"
9	Robert Kišerlovski (CRO)	Astana	+ 8"
10	Kanstantsin Sivtsov (BLR)	HTC–Highroad	+ 10"

General classification after stage 17

	Rider	Team	Time
1	Alberto Contador (ESP)	Saxo Bank–SunGard	68h 18' 27"
2	Michele Scarponi (ITA)	Lampre–ISD	+ 4' 58"
3	Vincenzo Nibali (ITA)	Liquigas–Cannondale	+ 5' 45"
4	John Gadret (FRA)	Ag2r–La Mondiale	+ 7' 35"
5	Kanstantsin Sivtsov (BLR)	HTC–Highroad	+ 9' 12"
6	José Rujano (VEN)	Androni Giocattoli	+ 9' 18"
7	Mikel Nieve (ESP)	Euskaltel–Euskadi	+ 9' 22"
8	Denis Menchov (RUS)	Geox–TMC	+ 9' 38"
9	Roman Kreuziger (CZE)	Astana	+ 9' 47"
10	Joaquim Rodríguez (ESP)	Team Katusha	+ 10' 25"

== Stage 18 ==
26 May 2011 – Morbegno to San Pellegrino Terme, 151 km (94 mi)

This stage was mostly flat, but about 30 km (19 mi) from the finish, the second-category Passo di Ganda crested. The finish came after a nearly 25 km (16 mi) long descent from the 1,060 m (3,480 ft) height reached on the Ganda, and a brief flat section.

With the last two road race stages featuring summit finishes, this was likely to be the last chance at a stage win for opportunistic breakaway riders. As such, there were a great number of attacks and counter-attacks in the first hour of racing, which covered 53 km (33 mi). Even well into the second hour of the stage, no group could distinguish itself off the front of the main field. Finally, after 100 km (62 mi) had been covered, Team RadioShack's Philip Deignan instigated a move on the Bergamo Alta, a steep cobbled climb that once featured in the Giro di Lombardia. He took with him ten riders from nine teams (Quick-Step placed both Jérôme Pineau and Kevin Seeldraeyers in the group). Race leader Alberto Contador's Saxo Bank–SunGard squad did not come to the front of the main field after these riders slipped away, content to let one of them be the stage victor. As they had in the previous stage, Liquigas–Cannondale and Lampre–ISD did most of the work at the head of the peloton.

Liquigas–Cannondale rode to hinder the chase rather than help it, since their rider Eros Capecchi had made the breakaway and was in fact proving himself to be one of the strongest riders on the day. He drove the escape group up the Passo di Ganda, and succeeded in whittling the leading group down to three – Capecchi himself, Seeldraeyers, and former race leader Marco Pinotti. The three worked cohesively to build a time gap, with Capecchi taking the most pulls, until there were only 3 km (1.9 mi) left to race. At this point it was clear that one of them would be the stage winner, so there was no need for further cooperation. Since none of the three of them had any sprinting abilities of note, tactics were to play a key role in the finale. Pinotti led out from just past the red kite indicating 1 km (0.62 mi) to go, with Seeldraeyers in second position and Capecchi third, coming close to losing the Belgian's wheel. The young Italian was able to take the optimal line on the final left-hand turn, with 200 m (660 ft) to go, to claim first position long enough to cross the line first ahead of Pinotti and then Seeldraeyers.

After the stage, Capecchi dedicated the victory to his late grandfather and cousin. He said the Giro so far had been a disappointment for him since he had not been able to help Vincenzo Nibali very much, and since he had missed out on wearing the white jersey for the best young rider competition. A seven-year pro despite being only 24 years old, Capecchi also took the occasion to outline further goals for his career, up to and including overall victory in a Grand Tour. Pinotti, for his part, was crushed to miss the stage win. He had specifically targeted this stage, since it ended near his childhood home. He correctly anticipated that the race would split on the Bergamo Alta, and found the winning breakaway, but did not have the closing speed to hold off Capecchi. He turned his attentions to the forthcoming stage 21 time trial. There was no change to the top of the overall standings after this stage, as all the top riders finished together again.

Stage 18 result

	Rider	Team	Time
1	Eros Capecchi (ITA)	Liquigas–Cannondale	3h 20' 38"
2	Marco Pinotti (ITA)	HTC–Highroad	s.t.
3	Kevin Seeldraeyers (BEL)	Quick-Step	s.t.
4	Gianluca Brambilla (ITA)	Colnago–CSF Inox	+ 1' 20"
5	Paolo Tiralongo (ITA)	Astana	+ 1' 20"
6	Dario Cataldo (ITA)	Quick-Step	+ 2' 49"
7	Alberto Losada (ESP)	Team Katusha	+ 3' 46"
8	Russell Downing (GBR)	Team Sky	+ 4' 34"
9	Oscar Gatto (ITA)	Farnese Vini–Neri Sottoli	+ 4' 34"
10	Jan Bakelants (BEL)	Omega Pharma–Lotto	+ 4' 34"

General classification after stage 18

	Rider	Team	Time
1	Alberto Contador (ESP)	Saxo Bank–SunGard	71h 45' 09"
2	Michele Scarponi (ITA)	Lampre–ISD	+ 4' 58"
3	Vincenzo Nibali (ITA)	Liquigas–Cannondale	+ 5' 45"
4	John Gadret (FRA)	Ag2r–La Mondiale	+ 7' 35"
5	Kanstantsin Sivtsov (BLR)	HTC–Highroad	+ 9' 12"
6	José Rujano (VEN)	Androni Giocattoli	+ 9' 18"
7	Mikel Nieve (ESP)	Euskaltel–Euskadi	+ 9' 22"
8	Denis Menchov (RUS)	Geox–TMC	+ 9' 38"
9	Roman Kreuziger (CZE)	Astana	+ 9' 47"
10	Joaquim Rodríguez (ESP)	Team Katusha	+ 10' 25"

== Stage 19 ==
27 May 2011 – Bergamo to Macugnaga, 209 km (130 mi)

This was categorized as a high mountain stage and involved a summit finish at Macugnaga. Since a far more difficult stage followed, pre-race analysis led to the expectation that the race's overall favorites would mostly mark one another on this stage and not show themselves strongly. Parts of 11 different Italian provinces were covered by the course for this stage.

Just like the previous day, a very combative first hour of racing resulted in no breakaway group establishing itself early on. After 51 km (32 mi), Jérôme Pineau, Matteo Rabottini, and Lars Bak, all of whom had previously found breakaways, were able to come clear. Heading toward the first climb of the day, the first-category Mottarone, Acqua & Sapone took control of the peloton, setting up their captain Stefano Garzelli for an attack on the climb. He took maximum points from the peloton to increase his lead in the mountains classification against overall leader Alberto Contador to a fairly substantial 11 points. He made it to the leading trio on the descent, as did Johann Tschopp and Mikaël Cherel who followed his acceleration. On approach to the second climb, Macugnaga, Team Katusha began pulling at the front of the main field, to try to set up their leader Joaquim Rodríguez. A big crash happened just after the Russian team took control of the race, resulting in HTC–Highroad's Craig Lewis and Marco Pinotti both needing to leave the race. Lewis struck a traffic sign and had a fractured femur, while Pinotti was treated for a knee injury and a suspected broken collarbone.

Team Katusha's efforts succeeded in bringing back the breakaway riders. After strenuous pulls from Danilo Di Luca, the group of overall favorites occupied first position on the road with 13.5 km (8.4 mi) remaining. Astana rider Paolo Tiralongo, Roman Kreuziger's top support rider in this Giro, attacked out of this group with 7 km (4.3 mi) remaining to the finish, all of it uphill. Hubert Dupont then launched with 2.5 km (1.6 mi) to, drawing Rodríguez with him. In short order, Rodríguez sped past Dupont, leaving himself second on the road behind Tiralongo. With 1,500 m (4,900 ft) to go, Contador came out of the trailing group and easily sped past both Rodríguez and Tiralongo. However, upon reaching Tiralongo, he effectively led him out to sprint for the finish. The two shared a few words in the stage's final meters, and for the second time Contador appeared to allow another rider a stage win he could have easily taken himself. Contador said after the stage that he wanted to give the stage victory to Tiralongo as a gesture of thanks for all the riding the Italian did for him when he was with Astana the season prior. He said that he considers Tiralongo a good friend, and hopes that Saxo Bank–SunGard will sign him once his contract with Astana expires, after the 2011 season. Tiralongo echoed many of these sentiments, recalling that he had spent less time with his family at home than with Contador and Alexander Vinokourov during the 2010 season. He also revealed that Contador had been the one to encourage him to attack for victory. It was the first race win in Tiralongo's 12-year career. While Vincenzo Nibali's third place time gap and time bonus moved him 13 seconds closer to Michele Scarponi in the overall standings, the biggest change in the overall standings was due to José Rujano finishing a distant 23rd on the day, 2'20" back of Tiralongo and Contador. He dropped to tenth overall.

Stage 19 result

	Rider	Team	Time
1	Paolo Tiralongo (ITA)	Astana	5h 26' 27"
2	Alberto Contador (ESP)	Saxo Bank–SunGard	s.t.
3	Vincenzo Nibali (ITA)	Liquigas–Cannondale	+ 3"
4	John Gadret (FRA)	Ag2r–La Mondiale	+ 6"
5	Joaquim Rodríguez (ESP)	Team Katusha	+ 6"
6	Steven Kruijswijk (NED)	Rabobank	+ 6"
7	Michele Scarponi (ITA)	Lampre–ISD	+ 8"
8	Roman Kreuziger (CZE)	Astana	+ 21"
9	Hubert Dupont (FRA)	Ag2r–La Mondiale	+ 29"
10	Kanstantsin Sivtsov (BLR)	HTC–Highroad	+ 34"

General classification after stage 19

	Rider	Team	Time
1	Alberto Contador (ESP)	Saxo Bank–SunGard	77h 11' 24"
2	Michele Scarponi (ITA)	Lampre–ISD	+ 5' 18"
3	Vincenzo Nibali (ITA)	Liquigas–Cannondale	+ 5' 52"
4	John Gadret (FRA)	Ag2r–La Mondiale	+ 7' 53"
5	Kanstantsin Sivtsov (BLR)	HTC–Highroad	+ 9' 58"
6	Mikel Nieve (ESP)	Euskaltel–Euskadi	+ 10' 08"
7	Roman Kreuziger (CZE)	Astana	+ 10' 20"
8	Joaquim Rodríguez (ESP)	Team Katusha	+ 10' 43"
9	Denis Menchov (RUS)	Geox–TMC	+ 10' 51"
10	José Rujano (VEN)	Androni Giocattoli	+ 11' 50"

== Stage 20 ==
28 May 2011 – Verbania to Sestriere, 242 km (150 mi)

The course for the final road race stage was flat for the first 200 km (120 mi), but it was at that point that the first-category Colle delle Finestre began. This climb is 18 km (11 mi) long, has some unpaved sections, and reaches 2,178 m (7,146 ft) in height. After a descent, the somewhat easier second-category ascent of Sestriere was the race's final climb. Sestriere first featured in the Giro in 1911, making this its 100th anniversary in the race.

A group of 13 riders, each representing a different team, broke away from the peloton almost immediately after the beginning of this stage. They quickly attained an advantage of over 11 minutes, since no GC threat was posed – Vasil Kiryienka, starting the day over an hour down on race leader Alberto Contador, was the highest-placed man in the group. Liquigas–Cannondale took the pace in the main field when the break's time gap reached its highest point, trying to make the race hard for Michele Scarponi and the other riders near their leader Vincenzo Nibali in the overall standings. An attack by José Rujano out the front of this group effectively reduced it to just 30 riders. On the ascent of the Colle delle Finestre, Kiryienka attacked and easily got clear of his breakaway companions, none of whom had any real climbing prowess. He crested the Finestre with an advantage of over four minutes on the pink jersey group. As that group neared the top, at a point with many switchback turns, Rujano again attacked and got clear. He stayed clear to the finish, moving up from tenth overall to sixth with his ride on the day. The efforts to chase him down resulted in Nibali getting gapped off the back of the group. He was able to chase back onto the group on the descent of the Finestre, but again lost pace on the ascent of Sestriere, finishing 22 seconds behind Scarponi's group and losing any real chance of overtaking him for second place. The only remaining stage was the individual time trial, and though Nibali is the better time trialist of the two, he was unlikely to take 56 seconds out of Scarponi, which was his deficit to his fellow Italian.

Joaquim Rodríguez and Steven Kruijswijk, trying to enter the top five and top ten overall respectively, attacked on the way up Sestriere. Rodríguez' was much more successful, as he finished more than a minute ahead of the other elite riders and moved up to fifth overall with the result. Kruijswijk took 18 seconds out of Roman Kreuziger for the best young rider competition, but with over two minutes still in hand the Czech rider was all but assured of winning the jersey at the Giro's conclusion. The young Dutchman did, however, enter the top ten, at the expense of Kanstantsin Sivtsov, who lost three and a half minutes to the race's elite riders and fell to 11th place overall. Mikel Nieve also lost considerable time in 17th on the day, falling from sixth to tenth.

With the race among themselves the primary concern, the top overall riders never made any serious inroads into Kiryienka's advantage. They surpassed every other member of the morning breakaway other than Acqua & Sapone's Carlos Betancur, but the Belarusian at the front of the race actually continued to add to his advantage as the Sestriere climb wore on. He was first at the finish by nearly five minutes over Rujano in second. Knowing he had the stage won by a considerable margin, Kiryienka slowed in the final meters to straighten out his jersey to more clearly show his team's sponsor's logo. As he crossed the finish line, he looked and pointed skyward, dedicating his victory to recently deceased teammate Xavier Tondó. He said after the stage that even though Tondó had not been part of the team for very long, his loss was still profoundly felt. Kiryienka acknowledged that the team had discussed possibly withdrawing from the race, but he and the other riders all felt that the best tribute to Tondó was to continue racing, and to get a further stage win in his honor, while other members of the team spent time with his family. He had come to the Giro hoping to ride for an overall placing, but had a bad day on the Passo Giau and fell precipitously in the overall classification because of it, which further intensified his desire for a stage win.

Stage 20 result

	Rider	Team	Time
1	Vasil Kiryienka (BLR)	Movistar Team	6h 17' 03"
2	José Rujano (VEN)	Androni Giocattoli	+ 4' 43"
3	Joaquim Rodríguez (ESP)	Team Katusha	+ 4' 50"
4	Carlos Betancur (COL)	Acqua & Sapone	+ 5' 31"
5	John Gadret (FRA)	Ag2r–La Mondiale	+ 5' 54"
6	Michele Scarponi (ITA)	Lampre–ISD	+ 5' 58"
7	Steven Kruijswijk (NED)	Rabobank	+ 5' 58"
8	Alberto Contador (ESP)	Saxo Bank–SunGard	+ 5' 58"
9	Denis Menchov (RUS)	Geox–TMC	+ 5' 58"
10	Roman Kreuziger (CZE)	Astana	+ 6' 16"

General classification after stage 20

	Rider	Team	Time
1	Alberto Contador (ESP)	Saxo Bank–SunGard	83h 34' 25"
2	Michele Scarponi (ITA)	Lampre–ISD	+ 5' 18"
3	Vincenzo Nibali (ITA)	Liquigas–Cannondale	+ 6' 14"
4	John Gadret (FRA)	Ag2r–La Mondiale	+ 7' 49"
5	Joaquim Rodríguez (ESP)	Team Katusha	+ 9' 27"
6	José Rujano (VEN)	Androni Giocattoli	+ 10' 23"
7	Roman Kreuziger (CZE)	Astana	+ 10' 38"
8	Denis Menchov (RUS)	Geox–TMC	+ 10' 51"
9	Steven Kruijswijk (NED)	Rabobank	+ 12' 56"
10	Mikel Nieve (ESP)	Euskaltel–Euskadi	+ 12' 57"

== Stage 21 ==
29 May 2011 – Milan, 26 km (16 mi) (individual time trial)

This was the Giro's one and only straightforward individual time trial. The course was flat and somewhat technical, with a handful of sharp turns. There were also several long straightaways. The course was shortened by 5.5 km (3.4 mi) four days before the stage took place, due to a special election taking place in Milan the same day as the stage. City officials expected high voter turnout and did not want the city center tied up by the race all day, so the revised route began at the outskirts of Milan instead of its center. It still ended, per its original design, at the Duomo di Milano.

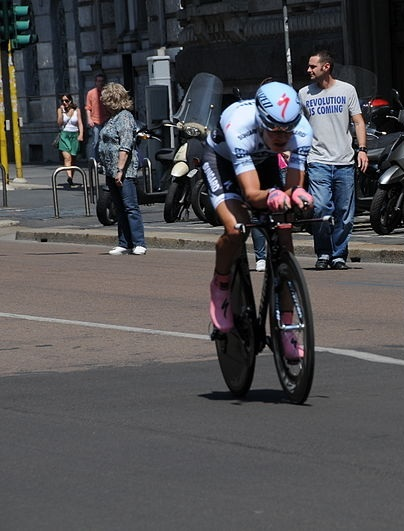
Saxo Bank–SunGard's Richie Porte, riding the time trial with pink shoes and gloves to celebrate teammate Alberto Contador's overall victory.

There was not very much to decide with regards to the overall standings coming into this stage. Race leader Alberto Contador held the biggest advantage over second place that he had ever had in any Grand Tour. Michele Scarponi, while a lesser time trialist than third-placed Vincenzo Nibali, also had sufficient time that, barring a crash, he could be all but assured of remaining in second overall. Fourth and fifth-placed John Gadret and Joaquim Rodríguez were both noted as especially poor time trialists, but Gadret had a substantial time advantage over Rodríguez and Rodríguez likewise over sixth-placed José Rujano. Sixth through eighth overall were in play, as only 28 seconds separated Rujano, Roman Kreuziger, and Denis Menchov, but there was over two minutes to the next main in the standings, Steven Kruijswijk. This meant both that Rujano, Kreuziger, and Menchov were almost certain to hold onto their top-ten placings, and Kreuziger would likewise retain and win the white jersey as best young rider.

Former race leader David Millar targeted the time trial, saying that with the withdrawal two days earlier of Marco Pinotti that he saw Contador as his chief rival. Contador, for his part, stated that he would not ride the time trial to win, already savoring overall victory. Millar was among the earliest starters on the day and posted a time of 30'13" that proved solidly better than the rest of the field, bar HTC–Highroad's Alex Rasmussen. The Dane had started shortly after Millar and stopped the clocked in 30'20", but had ridden the last kilometer with a flat rear tire. He rued the day after the stage that it had cost him a stage win, because no one finished within 30 seconds of these two riders. Remarkably, Contador's ride was good for third on the day, despite having said he was purposely not going to give his strongest effort. Both Rasmussen and Contador were better than Millar at the intermediate time check, but neither was faster at the finish. The win gave Millar the distinction of stage wins for his career at all three Grand Tours, after he had earlier in the race earned the distinction of having worn the overall leader's jersey at all three Grand Tours.

Most of the other overall positions held up, as the race's top riders had incident-free time trials. Rujano ceded 59 seconds to Kreuziger, which resulted in him dropping to seventh. He might have dropped further had Menchov not had an uncharacteristically bad day racing against the clock. The Russian all-round was 35th on the day, only 22 seconds better than Rujano, which was not enough to overtake him. Mikel Nieve, known to be a weak time trialist, was nearly four minutes slower than the winning time, which opened the door for Kanstantsin Sivtsov, tenth on the day, to move back into the top ten overall. Nieve's final overall placing was 11th, still almost two minutes better than Hubert Dupont. Contador cemented his sixth career Grand Tour victory, though with a Court of Arbitration for Sport hearing regarding his positive test for clenbuterol at the 2010 Tour de France, it was far from certain what place his ride would occupy in the history books. He also won the red jersey for the points competition, with Kreuziger taking home the white jersey for the youth competition and Stefano Garzelli the mountains classification green jersey.

Stage 21 result

	Rider	Team	Time
1	David Millar (GBR)	Garmin–Cervélo	30' 13"
2	Alex Rasmussen (DEN)	HTC–Highroad	+ 7"
3	Alberto Contador (ESP)	Saxo Bank–SunGard	+ 36"
4	Richie Porte (AUS)	Saxo Bank–SunGard	+ 43"
5	Yaroslav Popovych (UKR)	Team RadioShack	+ 55"
6	Jos van Emden (NED)	Rabobank	+ 1' 02"
7	Cameron Meyer (AUS)	Garmin–Cervélo	+ 1' 04"
8	Patrick Gretsch (GER)	HTC–Highroad	+ 1' 08"
9	Tiago Machado (POR)	Team RadioShack	+ 1' 12"
10	Kanstantsin Sivtsov (BLR)	HTC–Highroad	+ 1' 16"

Final General Classification

	Rider	Team	Time
1	Alberto Contador (ESP)	Saxo Bank–SunGard	84h 05' 14"
2	Michele Scarponi (ITA)	Lampre–ISD	+ 6' 10"
3	Vincenzo Nibali (ITA)	Liquigas–Cannondale	+ 6' 56"
4	John Gadret (FRA)	Ag2r–La Mondiale	+ 10' 04"
5	Joaquim Rodríguez (ESP)	Team Katusha	+ 11' 05"
6	Roman Kreuziger (CZE)	Astana	+ 11' 28"
7	José Rujano (VEN)	Androni Giocattoli	+ 12' 12"
8	Denis Menchov (RUS)	Geox–TMC	+ 12' 18"
9	Steven Kruijswijk (NED)	Rabobank	+ 13' 51"
10	Kanstantsin Sivtsov (BLR)	HTC–Highroad	+ 14' 10"
