= 2011 Giro d'Italia =

2011 UCI World Tour, race 14 of 27
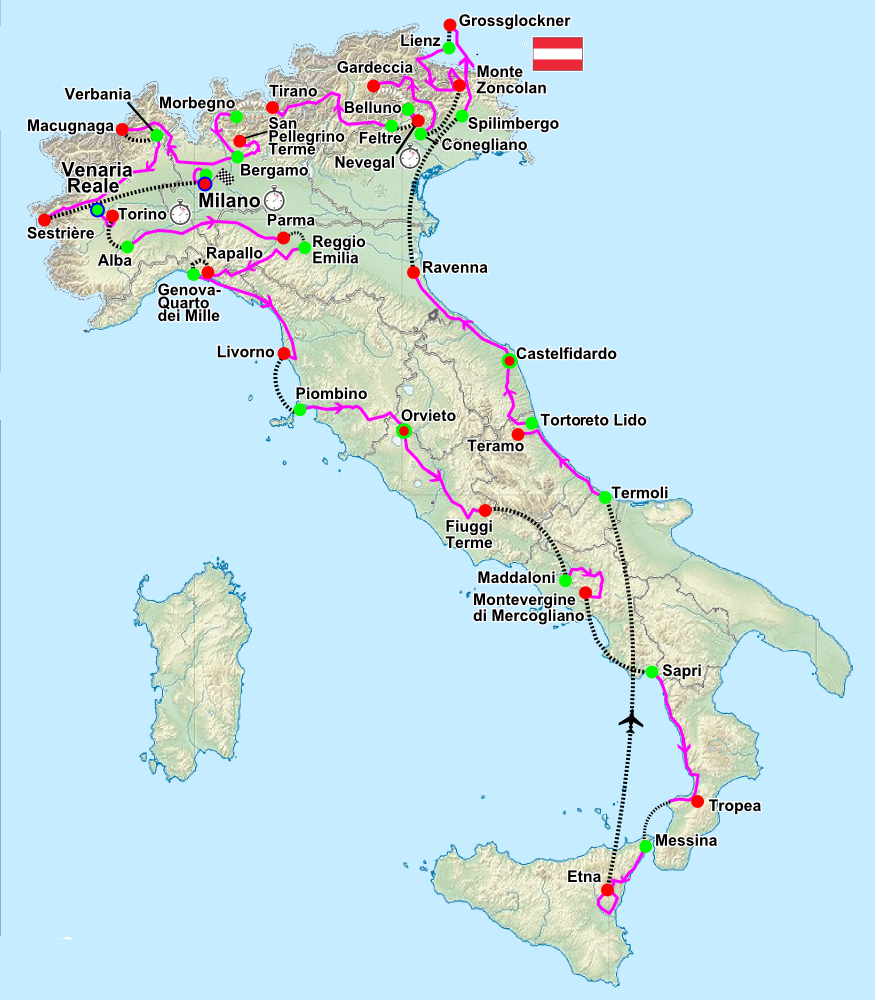
- Overview of the stages; purple lines represent distances covered in the individual stages, while black dotted lines are the distances covered in transfers between the stages

Race details
- Dates: 7–29 May 2011
- Stages: 21
- Distance: 3,434 km (2,134 mi)
- Winning time: 84h 11' 24"

Results
Jersey awarded to the overall winner	Winner	~~Alberto Contador~~ Michele Scarponi (ITA)	(Lampre–ISD)
	Second	Vincenzo Nibali (ITA)	(Liquigas–Cannondale)
	Third	John Gadret (FRA)	(Ag2r–La Mondiale)
Jersey awarded to the points classification winner	Points	~~Alberto Contador~~ Michele Scarponi (ITA)	(Lampre–ISD)
Jersey awarded to the mountains classification winner	Mountains	Stefano Garzelli (ITA)	(Acqua & Sapone)
Jersey awarded to the young rider classification winner	Young rider	Roman Kreuziger (CZE)	(Astana)
	Sprints	Jan Bakelants (BEL)	(Omega Pharma–Lotto)
Jersey awarded to the combativity classification winner	Combativity	~~Alberto Contador~~ Stefano Garzelli (ITA)	(Acqua & Sapone)
	Team	Astana	
	Team points	Lampre–ISD	

The 2011 Giro d'Italia was the 94th Giro d'Italia, one of cycling's Grand Tours. The race started on 7 May with a team time trial in Turin to celebrate the 150th anniversary of Italian unification, when the city served as the first capital of the single state.

The route was one of the most difficult in the modern history of the race, with substantial criticism that it was simply too hard for a three-week-long race. Of the seven stages categorized as 'high mountain', six had summit arrivals, highlighted by the three stages before the second rest day ending at Grossglockner in Austria, the exceptionally steep Monte Zoncolan, and a tall and steep peak near the Fascia Valley in Gardeccia. There was also, for the fifth consecutive Giro, a climbing time trial, this one to the Nevegal. Of the race's 18 mass-start stages, only three ended with the majority of the field together at the front of the race.

In the third stage, Leopard Trek rider Wouter Weylandt crashed coming down the Passo del Bocco, near the town of Mezzanego, suffering catastrophic injury. Despite substantial resuscitation efforts, he was established to have died on the spot. The fourth stage was not competitively raced; instead, it was run as a cycling procession. On the second rest day, Xavier Tondó, a member of Movistar Team, was killed in an accident at his home. Although he was not a participant, his death caused his teammates and other members of the peloton to pay tribute to him in the subsequent stages.

Strong overall favorite Alberto Contador was the race's original winner, in what constituted his second Giro championship. His winning margin ahead of second-placed Michele Scarponi was over six minutes. He also won the points competition as the most consistent high finisher, also with a substantial lead over Scarponi in second place, and Vincenzo Nibali completed the podium. In the other sub-classifications, Stefano Garzelli won the mountains competition and Roman Kreuziger finished as the best rider aged 25 or under in the general classification; he finished the race fifth overall.

In February 2012, the Court of Arbitration for Sport decided that Contador, following his positive test for clenbuterol at the 2010 Tour de France, lost his results since that event. He was therefore stripped of the 2011 Giro title, and Scarponi became the new victor of the race, and the winner of the points classification.

== Teams ==
All 18 UCI ProTeams were invited automatically and obligated to attend. Two UCI Professional Continental teams were announced well ahead of time, Androni Giocattoli and Farnese Vini–Neri Sottoli. UCI rules normally limit races to a peloton of 200 riders, but the Giro received special dispensation for a 207-rider peloton, allowing a 23rd team. The three additional invited teams were Acqua & Sapone, Colnago–CSF Inox, and Geox–TMC. Despite talk that ProTeam Vacansoleil–DCM might be excluded due to the doping scandals involving team members Riccardo Riccò and Ezequiel Mosquera, they were included pursuant to UCI rules.

The full list of participating teams is:

- Acqua & Sapone
- Ag2r–La Mondiale
- Androni Giocattoli
- Astana
- BMC Racing Team
- Colnago–CSF Inox
- Euskaltel–Euskadi
- Farnese Vini–Neri Sottoli
- Garmin–Cervélo
- Geox–TMC
- HTC–Highroad
- Lampre–ISD
- Leopard Trek
- Liquigas–Cannondale
- Omega Pharma–Lotto
- Quick-Step
- Rabobank
- Saxo Bank–SunGard
- Team Katusha
- Movistar Team
- Team RadioShack
- Team Sky
- Vacansoleil–DCM

== Pre-race favorites ==
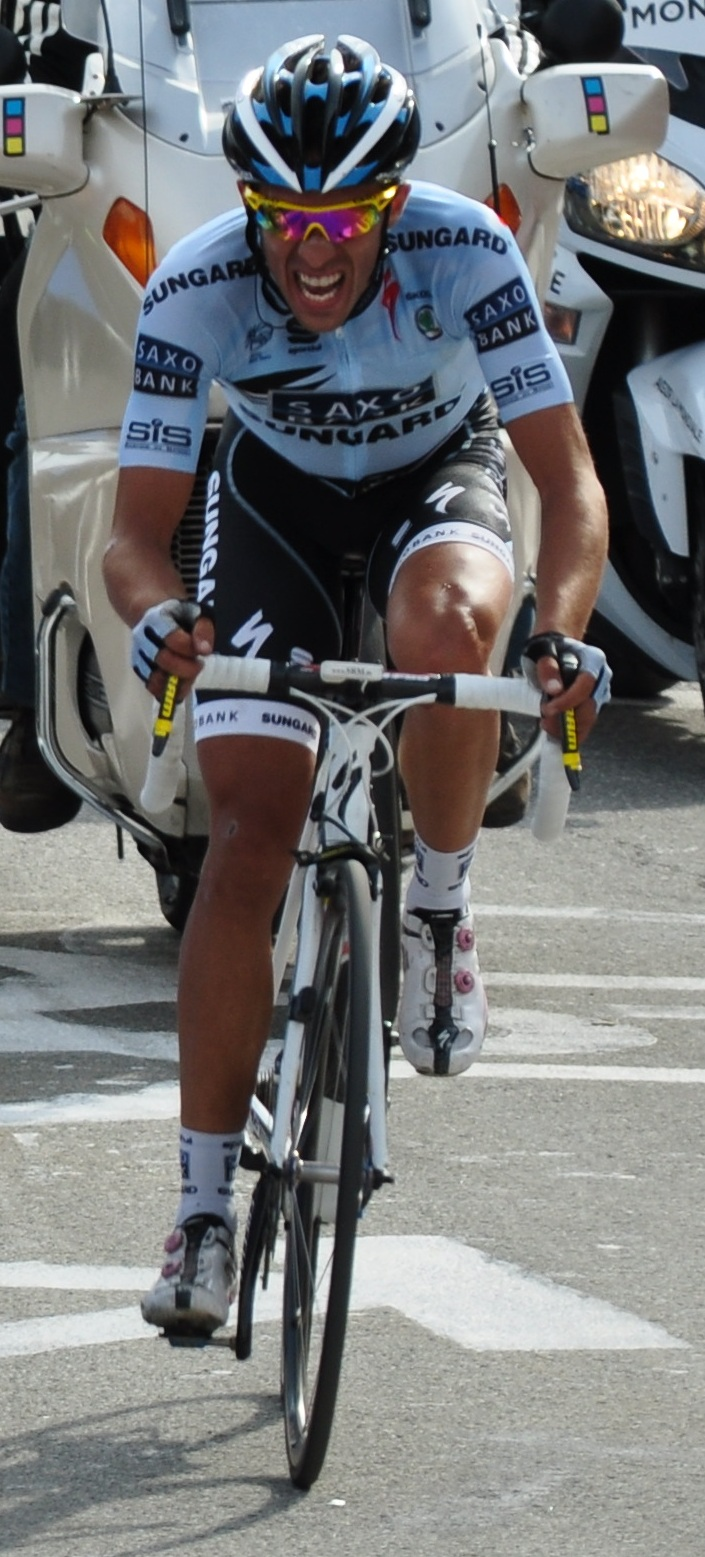
Five-time Grand Tour winner Alberto Contador, pictured riding the 2011 Tour de France later in the season, was the strongest overall favorite.

While the Giro had in its peloton many notable riders, including six former Grand Tour winners, the odds-on favorite was always Saxo Bank–SunGard's Alberto Contador. The 2008 Giro champion, who had likewise won the 2008 Vuelta a España and three editions of the Tour de France, announced in April 2010 that he would contest the Giro in 2011. Though his status was put in doubt after a positive test for clenbuterol at the 2010 Tour de France, he was cleared by his national federation in February 2011 and able to return to racing, though the case still pended a final appeal to the Court of Arbitration for Sport later in 2011. Contador was the overwhelming favorite for overall victory. Reigning Giro champion Ivan Basso chose not to return, preferring to focus on the Tour de France later in the season. He briefly considered riding as a domestique for Vincenzo Nibali, but opted against it because of his physical condition at the time and the feeling that doing so would be disrespectful to the race. The 2011 Giro was thus the third successive edition, and fourth in the last five, in which the reigning champion did not return to defend his championship.

The other five former Grand Tour winners in the field were Stefano Garzelli, Danilo Di Luca, Denis Menchov, Carlos Sastre, and Vincenzo Nibali. Of the five, only Menchov and Nibali were considered realistic overall contenders. Other riders named as contenders included Roman Kreuziger, riding as the leader of the Astana team and a protected rider in a Grand Tour for the first time in his career, 2010 Giro d'Italia runner-up David Arroyo, Lampre–ISD captain and 2010 Giro fourth-place finisher Michele Scarponi, and Joaquim Rodríguez. Riders further noted as darkhorses included Sastre, Contador's teammate and main support rider Richie Porte, Di Luca, Euskaltel–Euskadi's Igor Antón, Garzelli, Domenico Pozzovivo, Italian national champion Giovanni Visconti, and Team RadioShack's dual leaders Tiago Machado and Yaroslav Popovych. Visconti was given the irregular race number of 150, wearing it as the Italian national champion to commemorate 150 years of Italian unification. While squads are normally given numbers from the same group of ten, such as 151 through 159, numbers ending in zero are seldom issued. Visconti's Farnese Vini–Neri Sottoli squad wore numbers 150 through 158.

The ongoing Mantova doping investigation, involving members of the Lampre–NGC team, as it was known in 2009, had an effect on the race. It greatly affected the Lampre–ISD team itself, as their manager Giuseppe Saronni was implicated in the investigation and stepped down as team manager shortly before the Giro began. He was replaced by former Omega Pharma–Lotto sporting director Roberto Damiani. Their contingent for the Giro specifically excluded any riders or staff implicated in the investigation. The foremost of these riders was former Giro winner Damiano Cunego, though Damiani felt he would eventually be cleared of any wrongdoing. While the BMC Racing Team was unlikely to field an overall favorite, given that their top man Cadel Evans chose to focus on the Tour de France, they were also affected by the investigation, for the second year in a row. Just as they had before the 2010 Giro, the team suspended Alessandro Ballan and Mauro Santambrogio, members of the Lampre–NGC team in 2009 who were named in the investigation. As with 2010, the team reactivated the two riders after the Giro ended.

The near total dearth of flat, sprinter-friendly stages did not stop sprinters Mark Cavendish, Tyler Farrar, and Alessandro Petacchi, from all taking the start. One sprinter who was expected to take part in the race, Farnese Vini–Neri Sottoli's Andrea Guardini, was not part of the start list. Though his sporting director at the Presidential Cycling Tour of Turkey had promised him a place in the Giro should he win two stages at that event (Guardini did indeed win two stages in Turkey), the team believed he would be better served continuing to take part in somewhat smaller races. Other sprinters in the Giro peloton mainly came from much smaller teams and teams with little overall ambition. Quick-Step and Team RadioShack sent two sprinters apiece—Gerald Ciolek and Francesco Chicchi for the Belgian team and Robbie Hunter and Robbie McEwen on the American squad. Giro debutants Vacansoleil–DCM had among their squad Slovenian sprinter Borut Božič. Movistar Team's sprinter was Francisco Ventoso, one of the season's most prolific winners to date. The small Androni Giocattoli and Colnago–CSF Inox also sent sprinters, Roberto Ferrari and 2010 Giro stage winner Manuel Belletti, respectively. The Leopard Trek team had intended to send Daniele Bennati, a former winner of the points classification in the Giro d'Italia who had had great success at the recently run Circuit de la Sarthe. After a crash at the Tour de Romandie where he sustained multiple fractures and a lung contusion, he was forced out of the Giro. That squad therefore turned their sprinting hopes to the rider originally set to be Bennati's leadout man, Belgian sprinter Wouter Weylandt.

== Route and stages ==
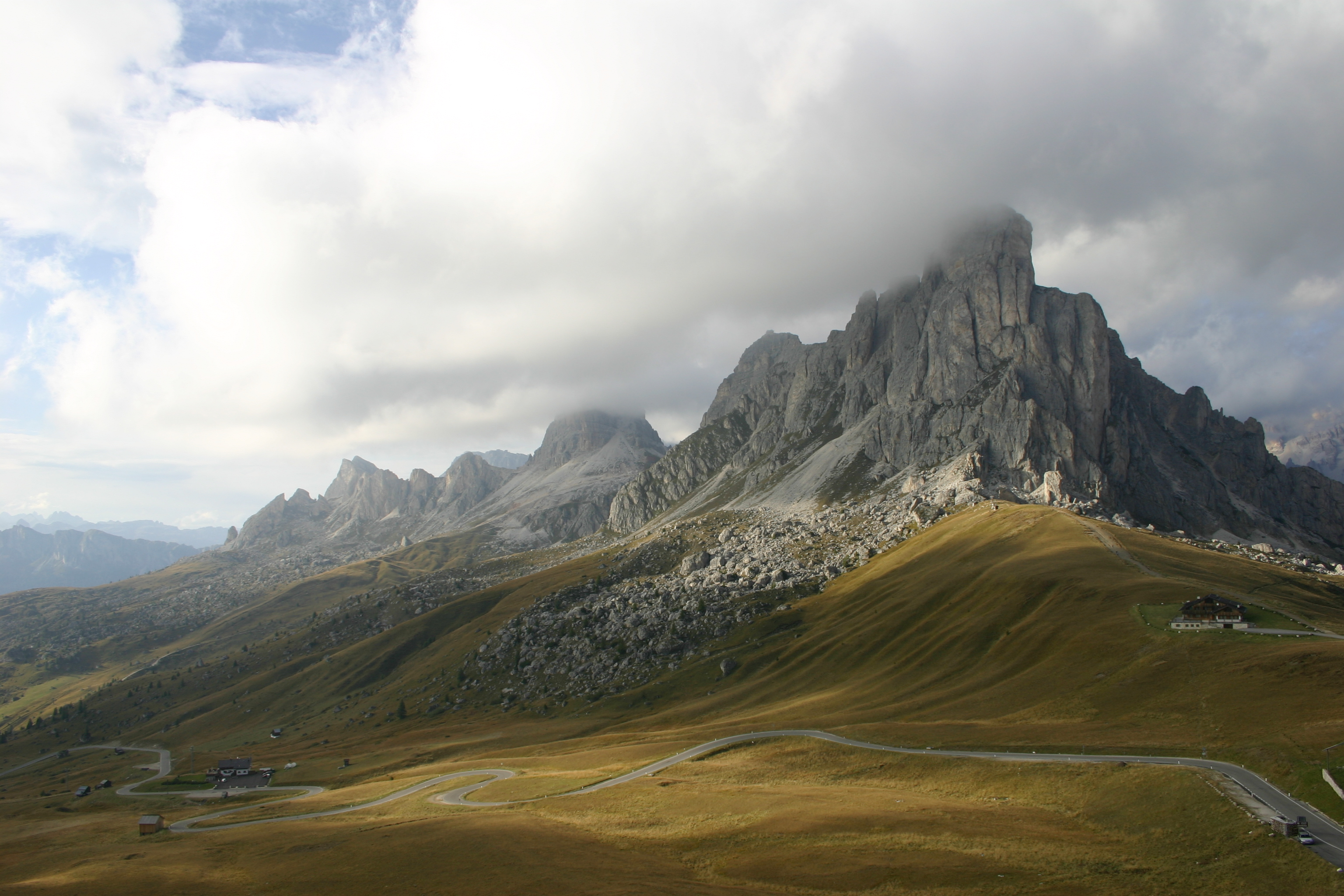
The Passo Giau, the highest point reached in the 2011 Giro d'Italia

The route for the 2011 Giro was unveiled in Turin on 23 October 2010. It was immediately recognized as being quite difficult, featuring 40 categorized climbs among its 18 mass-start stages, seven of them summit finishes. Seventeen of the 20 regions of Italy were visited in the race, as the 2011 race commemorated the 150th anniversary of the unification of Italy. Attention was immediately drawn to the three stages preceding the second rest day, stages 13, 14, and 15, each of which featured summit finishes and multiple high-rated climbs, among them the Grossglockner, Monte Zoncolan, and the Passo Giau, this Giro's Cima Coppi, its tallest climb. The route as it was originally announced was 3,496 km (2,172 mi) in length, just 4 km (2.5 mi) shy of the maximum length allowed under UCI regulations. The first summit finish was the Montevergine di Mercogliano in Stage 7, whilst the first week was concluded on the slopes of Mount Etna, which the peloton was faced with twice in stage 9. The final major climb was the Colle delle Finestre, which made its return after last featuring in the 2005 Giro d'Italia. While there were five stages classified as flat, and Italian sprinter Alessandro Petacchi claimed he saw as many as seven potential sprint finishes, consensus was overwhelming that the majority of the route favored the strongest of the climbers at the expense of other riders.

While the route did get some positive critiques, there was also critical opinion that it was simply too difficult. This was particularly in comparison with the similarly difficult, yet not as difficult, route for the 2011 Tour de France revealed days earlier. Team Sky sporting director Sean Yates called the route "brutal" and said that serious Tour de France contenders would not bother coming to the race since it was so difficult. This was seen as an early indication that his team's leader Bradley Wiggins would skip the Giro. Additional critical analysis concurred that the route was excessively difficult, for its incredible amount of vertical climbing (409 km (254 mi) in the route as originally announced), number of summit finishes and long transfers, and the unpaved or 'white roads' which featured in stages 5 and 20. Race director Angelo Zomegnan balked at the criticisms, saying simply "It's a hard Giro but the Giro has to be hard."

Two stages in the second half of the Giro had their courses altered shortly before they were run. The more notable was stage 14, which had been hyped as the début of the Monte Crostis in the Giro d'Italia. Commissaires from the UCI mandated it be removed the night before stage 14 was run. The Crostis is not a well-maintained pass, and Giro officials had set out a detailed protocol whereby team cars would not follow the race up or down the mountain, and only motorbikes offering wheel changes would be present with the riders. Team managers expressed concern that they would not fully be able to fulfill their duties if not present with the riders like normal, and this was given as the basis of the UCI's decision. They held that Giro organizers had sufficiently ensured rider safety on the course, but the necessary protocols did not protect the sporting aspect of the race. Thus, the Crostis was eliminated, and the stage was reduced in length from its originally planned length of 210 km (130 mi). The second-category Tualis climb was added to the route for the day to offset the loss of the Crostis. However, protests from spectators disappointed by the removal of the Crostis part of the route, including many who had volunteered for works to make parts of that road safe, led to the cancellation of the Tualis climb. The route was diverted while the stage was in progress to avoid a small village at the foot of the Tualis where protesters had gathered. Therefore, the length of the stage was shortened to 170 km (106 mi). The Giro's last stage, an individual time trial in Milan, was also shortened. The course was shortened by 5.5 km (3.4 mi) four days before the stage took place, due to a special election taking place in Milan the same day as the stage. City officials expected high voter turnout and did not want the city center tied up by the race all day, so the revised route began at the outskirts of Milan instead of its center. It still ended, per its original design, at the Duomo di Milano.

In spite of first-hand criticism from riders following the race that the route was excessively difficult and dangerous, Zomegnan remained staunch in his defense of the route.

Stage characteristics and winners
Stage	Date	Course	Distance	Type	Winner
1	7 May	Venaria Reale to Turin	19.3 km (12.0 mi)	Team time trial	HTC–Highroad
2	8 May	Alba to Parma	244 km (152 mi)	Flat stage	Alessandro Petacchi (ITA)
3	9 May	Reggio Emilia to Rapallo	173 km (107 mi)	Flat stage	Ángel Vicioso (ESP)
4	10 May	Quarto dei Mille to Livorno	216 km (134 mi)	Medium mountain stage	Stage neutralised
5	11 May	Piombino to Orvieto	191 km (119 mi)	Medium mountain stage	Pieter Weening (NED)
6	12 May	Orvieto to Fiuggi	216 km (134 mi)	Medium mountain stage	Francisco Ventoso (ESP)
7	13 May	Maddaloni to Montevergine di Mercogliano	110 km (68 mi)	Mountain stage	Bart De Clercq (BEL)
8	14 May	Sapri to Tropea	217 km (135 mi)	Flat stage	Oscar Gatto (ITA)
9	15 May	Messina to Etna	169 km (105 mi)	Mountain stage	~~Alberto Contador (ESP)~~; José Rujano (VEN)
	16 May	Rest day			
10	17 May	Termoli to Teramo	159 km (99 mi)	Flat stage	Mark Cavendish (GBR)
11	18 May	Teramo to Castelfidardo	142 km (88 mi)	Medium mountain stage	John Gadret (FRA)
12	19 May	Castelfidardo to Ravenna	184 km (114 mi)	Flat stage	Mark Cavendish (GBR)
13	20 May	Spilimbergo to Grossglockner (Austria)	167 km (104 mi)	Mountain stage	José Rujano (VEN)
14	21 May	Lienz (Austria) to Monte Zoncolan	170 km (106 mi)	Mountain stage	Igor Antón (ESP)
15	22 May	Conegliano to Gardeccia-Val di Fassa	229 km (142 mi)	Mountain stage	Mikel Nieve (ESP)
	23 May	Rest day			
16	24 May	Belluno to Nevegal	12.7 km (7.9 mi)	Individual time trial	~~Alberto Contador (ESP)~~; Vincenzo Nibali (ITA)
17	25 May	Feltre to Tirano	230 km (143 mi)	Mountain stage	Diego Ulissi (ITA)
18	26 May	Morbegno to San Pellegrino Terme	151 km (94 mi)	Medium mountain stage	Eros Capecchi (ITA)
19	27 May	Bergamo to Macugnaga	209 km (130 mi)	Mountain stage	Paolo Tiralongo (ITA)
20	28 May	Verbania to Sestriere	242 km (150 mi)	Mountain stage	Vasil Kiryienka (BLR)
21	29 May	Milan	26 km (16 mi)	Individual time trial	David Millar (GBR)

== Race overview ==
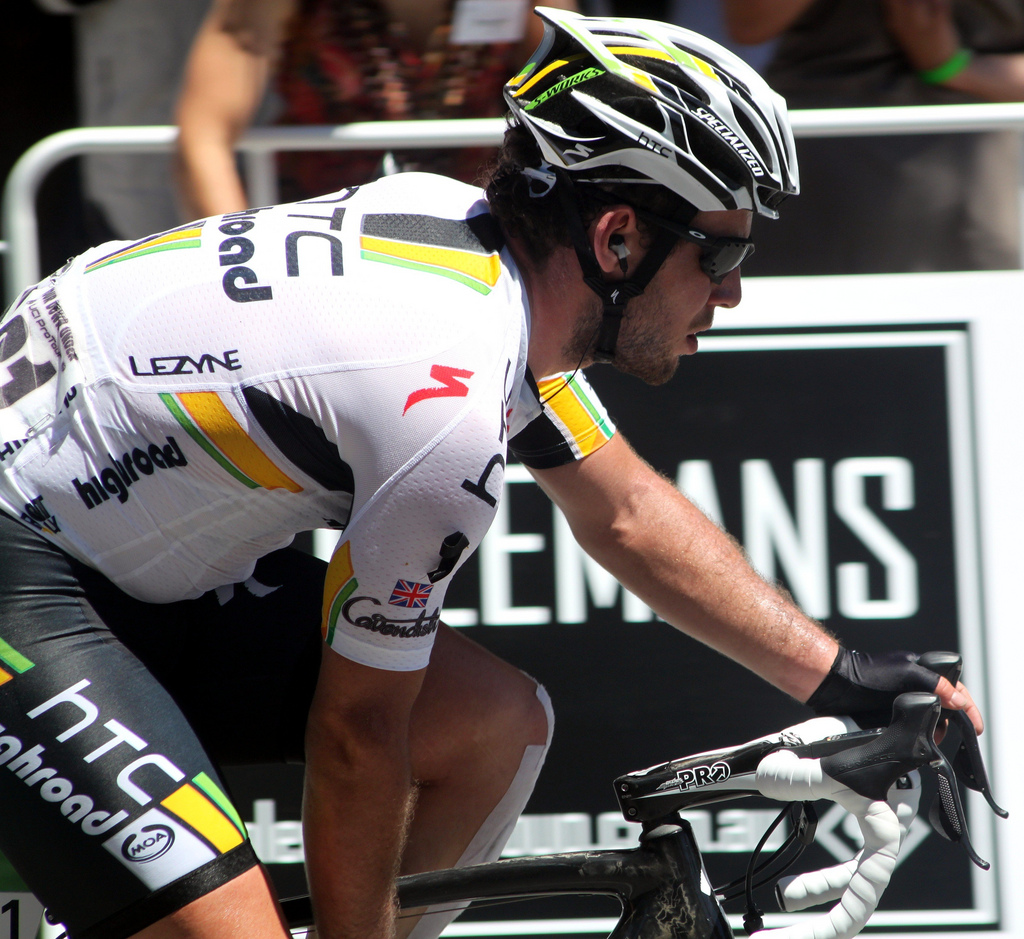
Mark Cavendish won two stages and wore the pink jersey – only Alberto Contador did the same.

The Giro began with a team time trial in the city that served as Italy's first federal capital, Turin. The HTC–Highroad squad won this stage, making their rider Marco Pinotti the first wearer of the race leader's pink jersey. That team's focus the next day was not to defend Pinotti's race lead, but to try to deliver their star sprinter Mark Cavendish to the victory, which would have the indirect effect of him overtaking Pinotti for the pink jersey. Cavendish indeed became the new race leader, but after an awkward final sprint it was not he but Italian Alessandro Petacchi who won the day. David Millar then became the third race leader in as many days when he finished with a breakaway group that was 21 seconds the better of the main field in stage 3, though this result was overshadowed by the death of Wouter Weylandt earlier in the stage.

The peloton chose not to run stage four competitively following Weylandt's death; instead the stage was ridden as a procession in his memory. The remaining members of his team Leopard Trek, as well as training partner Tyler Farrar from the Garmin–Cervélo squad, crossed the finish line first with their arms around one another before withdrawing from the race that evening. Stage 5 was held on the dirt roads of Tuscany, which had provided for one of the more spectacular stages in the 2010 Giro d'Italia. Dutch rider Pieter Weening won the stage with an 8-second time gap against the field. That, coupled with the 20-second time bonus for winning the day, gave him the pink jersey. There was some stability in the overall standings at this point, as the race's top riders finished together, or nearly so, in the next three stages.

Stage 9 was the first major mountain stage, featuring two ascents of Mount Etna, including a summit finish. It was on this day that strong overall favorite Alberto Contador first seized control of the race. Just after Androni Giocattoli's José Rujano attacked out of the leading group on the road on the way up to Etna for the last time, Contador did likewise. Rujano struggled mightily to hold Contador's wheel and no one else came close to reaching the pair. Contador won the stage, his first Giro stage win despite having won the Italian Grand Tour in 2008, and immediately attained a minute's advantage in the overall classification. In his five previous Grand Tour wins, Contador had never lost the race lead after taking it, but he had also never taken it so early on in the race. As teams who have riders with a legitimate chance to win a race overall will generally try to avoid defending the lead for too many days, lest they tire their support riders out early and leave their leader vulnerable, there was speculation that Contador would tactically relinquish the jersey. The Spaniard himself hinted that such a move would be in his plans. This would be likeliest to happen in the heavily undulating stage 11. The breakaway group for this stage was hard-fought and late-forming, since someone from its number could potentially become the new race leader. While Garmin–Cervélo's Christophe Le Mével, who entered the day third overall and had on two other occasions come within a time bonus of claiming the jersey, made the group, neither he nor anyone in it was destined to take pink. Largely under the impetus of Michele Scarponi's Lampre–ISD team, the breakaway group was caught before the finish. Contador and the rest of the overall favorites finished at the front of the race, with riders well down in the standings claiming the time bonuses, meaning Contador retained the race leadership after all.

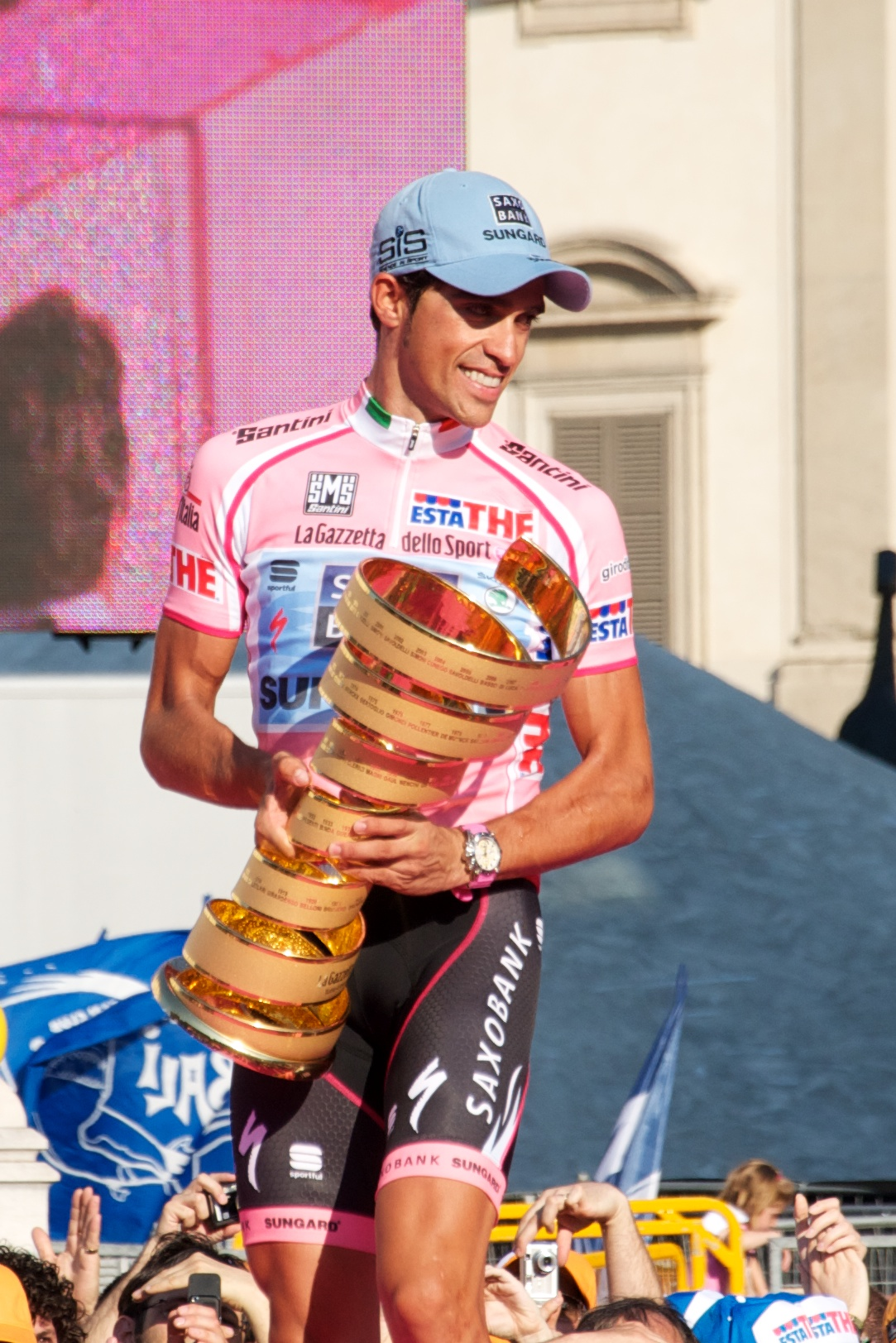
Alberto Contador celebrating his overall victory in Milan. He was later stripped of the title

Contador took the most time against the main field out of any day in stage 13. On this day, which ended at the Grossglockner in Austria, he and Rujano again finished well ahead of the main field. As they approached the finish line, Contador did not attempt to sprint for the win, allowing Rujano to take it. Their minute and a half time gap, plus the time bonus for second place, gave Contador a lead of over three minutes in the overall standings. Only in the 2009 Tour de France had he ever held a larger lead. The next two days were extremely difficult high mountain stages, both won by members of the Euskaltel–Euskadi team. Contador finished the best of any rider in the top five overall on both days, and so further padded his advantage. Wearing a black armband to memorialize fellow Spanish cyclist Xavier Tondó who, though not a participant in the race, died while it was run, Contador dominantly won the stage 16 uphill individual time trial. This result put him nearly five minutes clear of the next-best rider, the largest such advantage he had ever held in any race. In stage 19, Contador again finished with another rider ahead of the main field. This time it was Astana's Paolo Tiralongo, a former teammate of Contador's. Just as he had with Rujano earlier, Contador appeared to allow his companion a stage win he could have easily taken himself. Contador later commented that the victory, the first of Tiralongo's 12-year career, was meant as a gesture of thanks to the Italian for all the support riding he did for him in 2010 when the two were on the same squad. Although Contador claimed that he was not going to give his strongest effort in the stage 21 individual time trial, the Giro's final stage, his ride was still good enough for third place, extending his winning margin to over six minutes, giving him his sixth and statistically most dominant Grand Tour championship. Contador's two stage wins and numerous top five placings also made him the winner of the points competition, by a substantial margin. Michele Scarponi and Vincenzo Nibali completed the podium, in that order, having targeted one another once it became obvious that Contador's advantage was insurmountable. Nibali held second place on stages 13 and 14, but Scarponi overtook him on Gardeccia, finishing a minute and a half better (only six seconds the lesser of Contador), and never relinquished second place. Stefano Garzelli was in the breakaway on the Gardeccia stage and took maximum points on three of the day's five climbs, and second place points on the other two. It was largely thanks to this performance that he won the mountains classification at the end of the race. Roman Kreuziger, still eligible by a matter of months, won the youth competition with his ride to sixth place overall.

On the whole, success proved to be fairly widespread. As did Contador, Cavendish won two stages, stages 10 and 12, but prior to Cavendish's second victory no team, let alone individual rider, had won two individual stages. Four other teams – Androni Giocattoli, Euskaltel–Euskadi, Lampre–ISD, and Movistar Team – eventually repeated as stage winners. Androni Giocattoli won the ill-fated stage 3 with Ángel Vicioso and later stage 13 with Rujano. Euskaltel–Euskadi's wins came on the two most difficult stages in the race, the back-to-back high mountain stages that preceded the second rest day. Their leader Igor Antón won the controversy-laden day ending at Monte Zoncolan, when the Monte Crostis climb was removed from the route. The next day, Mikel Nieve won the stage that Contador described as the hardest of his life, a seven-and-a-half-hour day with five high climbs ending at Gardeccia. Following Petacchi's win in the contentious sprint that finished the first road stage, the Lampre–ISD team took another stage win with young Diego Ulissi in stage 17, after another contentious sprint in which Italian national champion Giovanni Visconti actually crossed the line first but was relegated to third for shoving Ulissi. The Movistar Team had winners in stage 6 with Francisco Ventoso on an uphill sprint and in the Giro's last road race stage with Vasil Kiryienka in a solo breakaway that finished almost five minutes better than the rest of the field. Rabobank, Omega Pharma–Lotto, Farnese Vini–Neri Sottoli, Ag2r–La Mondiale, Liquigas–Cannondale, Astana, and Garmin–Cervélo each won a single stage. With Acqua & Sapone's Garzelli claiming the mountains classification and Yaroslav Popovych from Team RadioShack the Trofeo Fuga Pinarello, 15 of the 22 teams that completed the race came away with some sort of victory.

Much like had occurred at the final podium celebrations for the 2009 Tour de France, the wrong national anthem was played for Contador. Race organizers mistakenly played an old Spanish anthem with lyrics favored by former Spanish dictator Francisco Franco. The Spanish national anthem as it should have been played would have been purely instrumental.

=== Death of Wouter Weylandt ===
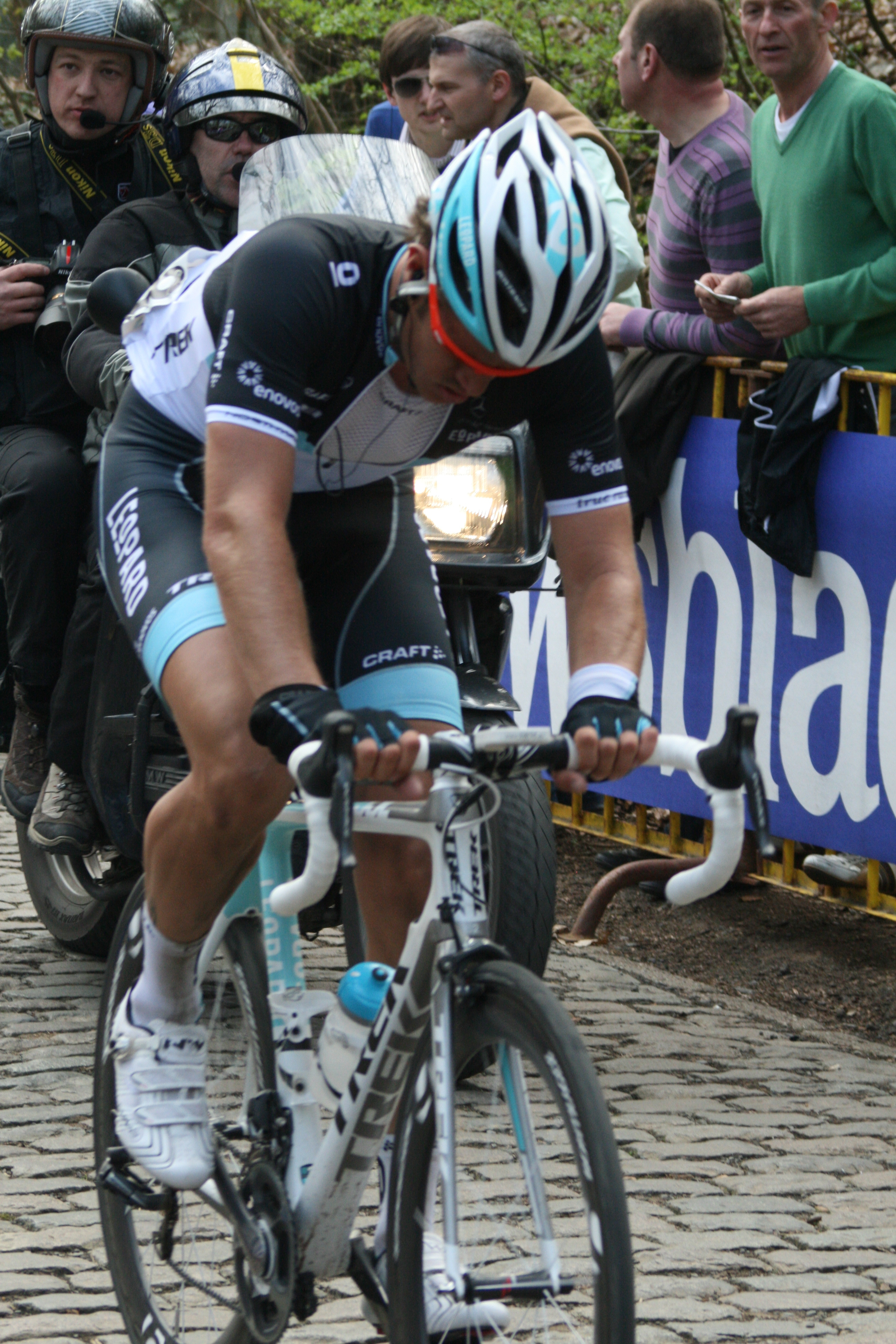
Wouter Weylandt, pictured here earlier in the season riding Gent–Wevelgem, crashed and died near the end of stage 3.

During the descent of the Passo del Bocco in stage 3, Leopard Trek rider Wouter Weylandt crashed and suffered catastrophic injury. Race doctor Giovanni Tredici, and the doctor for the Garmin–Cervélo team were in cars very near Weylandt's group on the road, and administered cardiopulmonary resuscitation for approximately 40 minutes. Doctors also gave Weylandt adrenaline and atropine to try to restart his heart, though Tredici stated that resuscitation efforts were rather clearly in vain, and that Weylandt was already dead by the time they got to him. Doctors were never able to revive Weylandt, and he was declared dead on the spot. A short time later, Weylandt's body was airlifted off the descent and taken to a nearby hospital, where the pathologist conducting the autopsy concluded that the Belgian had died immediately upon crashing. Weylandt's death was the first at the Giro in 25 years, and the first at one of cycling's Grand Tours since Fabio Casartelli died during the 1995 Tour de France.

Manuel Antonio Cardoso of Team RadioShack had been nearest to Weylandt when he crashed, and stated that Weylandt had touched a small retaining wall on the left side of the road with either his pedal or his handlebars, and was then catapulted across the road to the other side, where he again collided with something. He had looked behind him to ascertain his exact position in the race when he clipped the wall. Teammate Tom Stamsnijder also witnessed the accident, saying "it was a very hard fall." Italian police, conducting an inquest into Weylandt's death, also took an official statement from the Portuguese rider at Team RadioShack's hotel. A memorial was placed at the crash site, where Weylandt's pregnant girlfriend and his mother, along with cyclists, passersby and residents of nearby villages, placed flowers. The Leopard Trek team remained in the race for another day at the encouragement of Weylandt's family. David Millar, who had taken the race lead that same day, spent the evening discussing with members of Leopard Trek, Weylandt's best friend Tyler Farrar, and his girlfriend and mother how best to pay tribute to the fallen rider.

Race director Angelo Zomegnan said in a post-stage press conference that race officials would respect whatever decision the peloton made regarding the next day's stage. As usually occurs when a rider dies in the midst of a multi-day cycling event, the next day was not competitively raced. Instead, the stage was preceded by a minute's silence, and ridden as a procession in Weylandt's memory. Each of the 23 teams took to the front of the peloton for about 15 minutes, and members of Leopard Trek, along with Farrar, were allowed to finish first with their arms around each other. Millar led the rest of the field across the line a few seconds later. No results for the stage were recorded, and it did not count towards the general classification or any of the points competitions. After the stage, instead of any podium presentations, the four jersey classification leaders (Millar, Alessandro Petacchi, Gianluca Brambilla, and Jan Bakelants) appeared on stage with the Leopard Trek team to lead another moment of silence. Subsequently, Farrar and the remaining Leopard Trek squad all decided to leave the race. Farrar later revealed that his inclusion with the Leopard Trek squad in the final moments of the neutralized stage was a decision made solely on their part, one for which he felt extremely grateful.

A moment of silence was also held for Weylandt before stage 11, as his funeral took place the same day. Pieter Weening also gave the first pink jersey to be presented to him on the podium to Weylandt's surviving family, and stage 11 winner John Gadret stated that he had Weylandt in his thoughts as he crossed the line and dedicated his win to him, even though the two were not well acquainted.

=== Death of Xavier Tondó ===
On 23 May, during the second rest day of the Giro, Xavier Tondó, the reigning Vuelta a Castilla y León champion and one of the leaders on the season for the Movistar Team, was killed in a freak accident at home while preparing to train with teammates. He was reportedly crushed between his car and a garage door.

Although he was not taking part in this edition of the Giro, Tondó had participated in the 2010 edition and was a popular, well-liked rider. Race leader Alberto Contador, along with many others, rode the stage 16 individual time trial with black armbands. The stage was preceded by a minute of silence. Tondó's teammate Branislau Samoilau posted a time that was provisionally best much of the day and was visibly overcome with emotion when interviewed by assembled media after his ride. Contador, who recorded the best time in the time trial, dedicated the victory to Tondó, as the two were acquainted despite never having been teammates.

Five days later, teammate and close friend Vasil Kiryienka rode to victory in a solo effort, and he too dedicated the stage victory to Tondó, pointing skyward as he crossed the finish line. The team had met to consider withdrawing from the race after Tondó's death, but instead the riders unanimously voted to ride on. Kiryienka commented that the squad at the Giro hoped to get a further stage win (as Francisco Ventoso's win had come before Tondó's death) to honor him, while other members of the team grieved with Tondó's family. In the final days of the race, many fans wrote signs memorializing Tondó as they had with Weylandt earlier on.

=== Aftermath ===
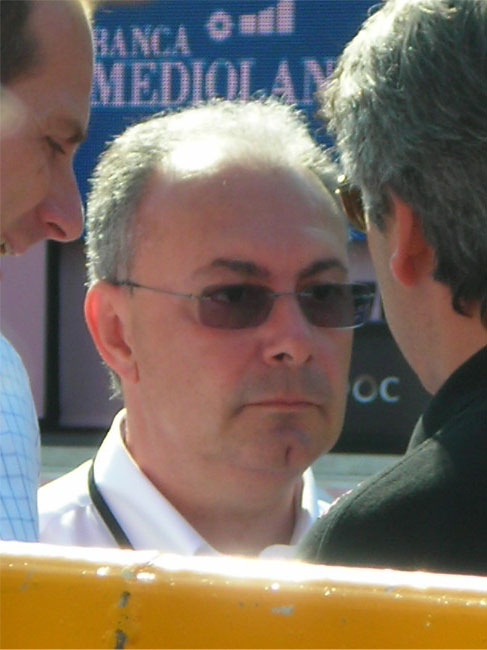
Angelo Zomegnan had been Giro director for seven years, but he was removed from that position after this race.

Immediately after Weylandt's death, Giro officials announced that they would not issue his dossard number 108 in future editions of the race. His number was a prominent part of signs held by fans on the roadside at not just the Giro but other events later in the season as well, including the Tour of California where his death was part of the reason the first stage of that race was canceled due to safety concerns. Many other races, mostly those held in Weylandt's native Belgium, also began the practice of not issuing the number. The Belgian federation criticized this gesture, saying it would not bring Weylandt back and would only serve to continually remind fans and those in the sport of Weylandt's death. They issued the number for the Belgian national road race championships.

About a month after the race concluded, reports began surfacing which stated that Giro director Angelo Zomegnan was going to be ousted from that position. Though praised for his delicate handling of Weylandt's death, Zomegnan's handling of the teams' protest of and eventual removal of the Monte Crostis from the Giro race route was seen much less approvingly. A further month later, RCS Sport, owners of the race, confirmed that Zomegnan had been removed from his largely autocratic position as race director. He was replaced by RCS general director Michele Acquarone and Mauro Vegni, along with a team of former professional riders. Zomegnan remains as an RCS consultant and director of the 2013 UCI Road World Championships in Florence. Zomegnan had held the position since 2004, beginning with the 2005 Giro d'Italia.

Along with the new organizational team came a certain measure of fan involvement in the direction of the 2012 Giro d'Italia. Fans of the race were able to vote on its official Facebook page for two climbs, from an initial pool of 64, to appear in the race. After several rounds of voting, the Stelvio Pass and the Passo del Mortirolo were chosen. They were later announced to be part of the same stage for the 2012 Giro. Fans were also given the opportunity to choose from among three prototypes for the design of the pink jersey in the 2012 Giro. Fans could also participate in a promotion called "Tweet Your Maglia Rosa" where they would submit 140-character or fewer Twitter messages describing what the pink jersey means to them. They were set to be printed on the jersey along with tweets from Ivan Basso, Cadel Evans, Alberto Contador, and Vincenzo Nibali, in the respective riders' native languages. Ten tweets – six to be printed in Italian, two in English, and one each in Spanish and French – were eventually chosen by fan voting.

== Contador's results stripped ==
Alberto Contador rode the Giro with full knowledge that he was to answer to the Court of Arbitration for Sport (CAS) regarding his positive test for clenbuterol at the 2010 Tour de France, since his national federation cleared him of doping charges but both the UCI and the World Anti-Doping Agency (WADA) chose to appeal the ruling. He rode and won with the most dominant Grand Tour performance of his career, and later rode a relatively normal and full 2011 season as his CAS date was continually pushed back. It was originally scheduled for June, to occur soon enough to decide conclusively his status prior to the 2011 Tour de France, but it was instead pushed back to August and then again to November.

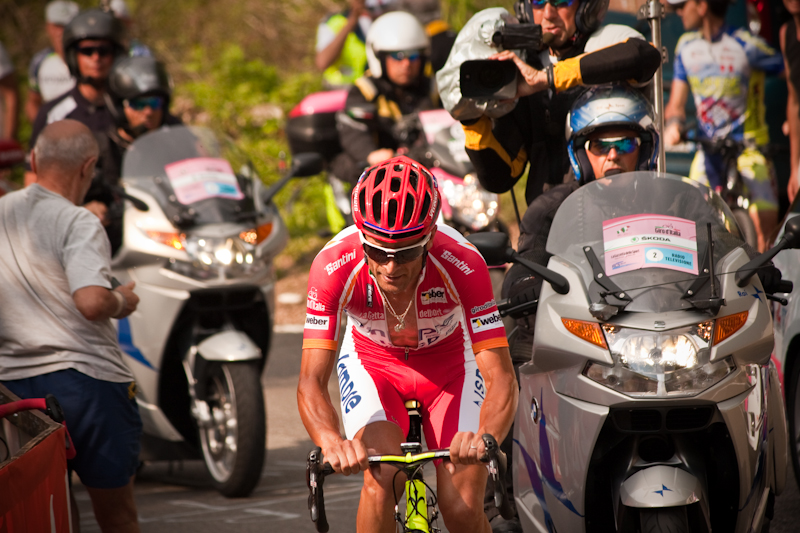
Michele Scarponi became Giro champion upon Contador's disqualification. He is pictured here during the Nevegal time trial wearing the points classification red jersey in Contador's stead. He inherited that classification victory as well.

The hearing was at last held in November, with a verdict expected in January 2012. This, however, was also subject to a delay. Finally, on 6 February 2012, the court spoke, overturning the Spanish federation's decision to clear Contador and assessing the rider a backdated two-year ban, from the date of his adverse test at the 2010 Tour de France. The backdated ban meant any results obtained from the time of that test to the time the court announced its verdict were to be vacated and awarded in turn to previously second-placed riders. This effectively made Michele Scarponi the new Giro champion and points winner, and it made José Rujano and Vincenzo Nibali into stage winners in this Giro. The decision was reminiscent of that handed down in the Alessandro Petacchi case from the 2007 Giro d'Italia. The court's ruling opinion was that the minute amount of clenbuterol found was probably not caused by a doping regimen, but that strict liability rules meant that Contador had nonetheless violated WADA's World Anti-Doping Code. The court held that the adverse finding itself was never in doubt, but merely how the substance had entered the athlete's body. This was not a matter under which they could exonerate him.

Reaction to the decision, and to the protracted nature of the case itself, was widespread and negative. Five-time Giro winner Eddy Merckx expressed surprise at the result and disappointment that it could further sully the sport's image, saying "It's like someone wants to kill cycling." Since-ousted race director Angelo Zomegnan called the decision to strip the Giro championship "nonsense", noting that Contador was permitted to ride at the time and there were no irregularities of any kind during the race. His successor Michele Acquarone was also upset by the decision, believing that damage had been done to the Giro and noting that RCS Sport would need to commission a new trophy to award to Scarponi.

Scarponi, as well as John Gadret, the rider elevated onto the podium now in third place overall, both expressed sympathy for Contador and the feeling that being awarded these prestigious results in a court of law nearly a year after the race concluded kept them from feeling as good as they would were they attained on the road. Both Scarponi's overall championship and Gadret's podium finish constituted the first such results for either of them in a Grand Tour. Gadret, who had supported Contador's presence in the Giro peloton when the race began, reconsidered his position in hindsight, saying the Spaniard's attendance irrevocably changed the race. Further reactions from other personalities within the sport toward the ruling and the case itself were near universally negative. WADA celebrated the decision, calling the court "robust and thorough" in its jurisprudence of the World-Anti Doping Code.

== Classification leadership ==
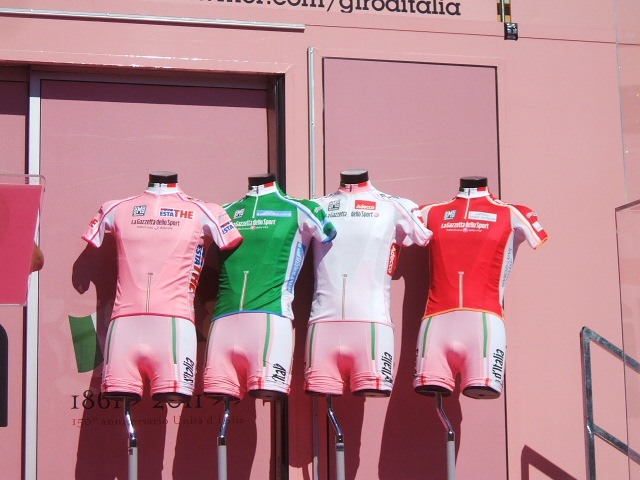
The Giro's four special jerseys on display in Milan before the final podium presentations.

In the 2011 Giro d'Italia, four different jerseys were awarded. For the general classification, calculated by adding each cyclist's finishing times on each stage, and allowing time bonuses for the first three finishers on mass-start stages, the leader received a pink jersey. This classification was considered the most important of the Giro d'Italia, and the winner was considered the winner of the Giro.

Additionally, there was a points classification, which awarded a red jersey. In the points classification, cyclists got points for finishing in the top 15 in a stage. Unlike in the better known points classification in the Tour de France, the type of stage had no effect on what points were on offer – each stage had the same points available on the same scale. The win earned 25 points, second place earned 20 points, third 16, fourth 14, fifth 12, sixth 10, and one point fewer per place down to a single point for 15th. In addition, points could be won in intermediate sprints.

There was also a mountains classification, the leadership of which was marked by a green jersey. In the mountains classifications, points were won by reaching the top of a climb before other cyclists. Each climb was categorized as either first, second, third, or fourth-category, with more points available for the higher-categorized climbs. The Cima Coppi, the race's highest point of elevation, awarded still more points than the other first-category climbs.

The fourth jersey represented the young rider classification, marked by a white jersey. This was decided the same way as the general classification, but only riders born after 1 January 1986 were eligible.

There were also three classifications for teams. In the Trofeo Fast Team classification, the times of the best three cyclists per team on each stage were added; the leading team was the team with the lowest total time; the Trofeo Super Team was a team points classification, with the top 20 placed riders on each stage earning points (20 for first place, 19 for second place and so on, down to a single point for 20th) for their team; and the Fair Play classification rewarded those teams that best avoided penalty points for minor technical infringements.

The rows in the following table correspond to the jerseys awarded after that stage was run, and shows to whom each jersey would have been awarded each day had Alberto Contador been removed from the standings as the race was ongoing.

Stage	Winner	General classification	Points classification	Mountains classification	Young rider classification
1	HTC–Highroad	Marco Pinotti	not awarded	not awarded	Bjørn Selander
2	Alessandro Petacchi	Mark Cavendish	Alessandro Petacchi	Sebastian Lang	Bjørn Selander
3	Ángel Vicioso	David Millar	Alessandro Petacchi	Gianluca Brambilla	Jan Bakelants
4	Stage neutralised	David Millar	Alessandro Petacchi	Gianluca Brambilla	Jan Bakelants
5	Pieter Weening	Pieter Weening	Alessandro Petacchi	Martin Kohler	Steven Kruijswijk
6	Francisco Ventoso	Pieter Weening	Alessandro Petacchi	Martin Kohler	Steven Kruijswijk
7	Bart De Clercq	Pieter Weening	Alessandro Petacchi	Bart De Clercq	Steven Kruijswijk
8	Oscar Gatto	Pieter Weening	Alessandro Petacchi	Bart De Clercq	Steven Kruijswijk
9	~~Alberto Contador~~; José Rujano	~~Alberto Contador~~; Kanstantsin Sivtsov	~~Alberto Contador~~; Alessandro Petacchi	Filippo Savini	Roman Kreuziger
10	Mark Cavendish	~~Alberto Contador~~; Kanstantsin Sivtsov	Alessandro Petacchi	Filippo Savini	Roman Kreuziger
11	John Gadret	~~Alberto Contador~~; Kanstantsin Sivtsov	Alessandro Petacchi	Filippo Savini	Roman Kreuziger
12	Mark Cavendish	~~Alberto Contador~~; Kanstantsin Sivtsov	Alessandro Petacchi	Filippo Savini	Roman Kreuziger
13	José Rujano	~~Alberto Contador~~; Vincenzo Nibali	~~Alberto Contador~~; Roberto Ferrari	~~Alberto Contador~~; José Rujano	Roman Kreuziger
14	Igor Antón	~~Alberto Contador~~; Vincenzo Nibali	~~Alberto Contador~~; Michele Scarponi	~~Alberto Contador~~; José Rujano	Roman Kreuziger
15	Mikel Nieve	~~Alberto Contador~~; Michele Scarponi	~~Alberto Contador~~; Michele Scarponi	Stefano Garzelli	Roman Kreuziger
16	~~Alberto Contador~~; Vincenzo Nibali	~~Alberto Contador~~; Michele Scarponi	~~Alberto Contador~~; Michele Scarponi	Stefano Garzelli	Roman Kreuziger
17	Diego Ulissi	~~Alberto Contador~~; Michele Scarponi	~~Alberto Contador~~; Michele Scarponi	Stefano Garzelli	Roman Kreuziger
18	Eros Capecchi	~~Alberto Contador~~; Michele Scarponi	~~Alberto Contador~~; Michele Scarponi	Stefano Garzelli	Roman Kreuziger
19	Paolo Tiralongo	~~Alberto Contador~~; Michele Scarponi	~~Alberto Contador~~; Michele Scarponi	Stefano Garzelli	Roman Kreuziger
20	Vasil Kiryienka	~~Alberto Contador~~; Michele Scarponi	~~Alberto Contador~~; Michele Scarponi	Stefano Garzelli	Roman Kreuziger
21	David Millar	~~Alberto Contador~~; Michele Scarponi	~~Alberto Contador~~; Michele Scarponi	Stefano Garzelli	Roman Kreuziger
Final		~~Alberto Contador~~ Michele Scarponi	~~Alberto Contador~~ Michele Scarponi	Stefano Garzelli	Roman Kreuziger

== Final standings ==
Legend
A pink jersey	Denotes the winner of the General classification	A green jersey	Denotes the winner of the Mountains classification
A red jersey	Denotes the winner of the Points classification	A white jersey	Denotes the winner of the Young rider classification

=== General classification ===
	Rider	Team	Time
DSQ	~~Alberto Contador (ESP)~~	~~Saxo Bank–SunGard~~	~~84h 05' 14"~~
1	Michele Scarponi (ITA)	Lampre–ISD	84h 11' 24"
2	Vincenzo Nibali (ITA)	Liquigas–Cannondale	+ 46"
3	John Gadret (FRA)	Ag2r–La Mondiale	+ 3' 54"
4	Joaquim Rodríguez (ESP)	Team Katusha	+ 4' 55"
5	Roman Kreuziger (CZE)	Astana	+ 5' 18"
6	José Rujano (VEN)	Androni Giocattoli	+ 6' 02"
7	Denis Menchov (RUS)	Geox–TMC	+ 6' 08"
8	Steven Kruijswijk (NED)	Rabobank	+ 7' 41"
9	Kanstantsin Sivtsov (BLR)	HTC–Highroad	+ 8' 00"
10	Mikel Nieve (ESP)	Euskaltel–Euskadi	+ 9' 58"

=== Points classification ===
	Rider	Team	Points
DSQ	~~Alberto Contador (ESP)~~	~~Saxo Bank–SunGard~~	~~186~~
1	Michele Scarponi (ITA)	Lampre–ISD	122
2	Vincenzo Nibali (ITA)	Liquigas–Cannondale	116
3	José Rujano (VEN)	Androni Giocattoli	107
4	John Gadret (FRA)	Ag2r–La Mondiale	97
5	Joaquim Rodríguez (ESP)	Team Katusha	87
6	Roman Kreuziger (CZE)	Astana	85
7	Stefano Garzelli (ITA)	Acqua & Sapone	81
8	Roberto Ferrari (ITA)	Androni Giocattoli	70
9	Pablo Lastras (ESP)	Movistar Team	66
10	Jan Bakelants (BEL)	Omega Pharma–Lotto	63

=== Mountains classification ===
	Rider	Team	Points
1	Stefano Garzelli (ITA)	Acqua & Sapone	67
DSQ	~~Alberto Contador (ESP)~~	~~Saxo Bank–SunGard~~	~~58~~
2	José Rujano (VEN)	Androni Giocattoli	43
3	Mikel Nieve (ESP)}	Euskaltel–Euskadi	39
4	Gianluca Brambilla (ITA)	Colnago–CSF Inox	29
5	Vasil Kiryienka (BLR)	Movistar Team	24
6	Emanuele Sella (ITA)	Androni Giocattoli	23
7	Michele Scarponi (ITA)	Lampre–ISD	23
8	Vincenzo Nibali (ITA)	Liquigas–Cannondale	22
9	Johnny Hoogerland (NED)	Vacansoleil–DCM	21
10	Jérôme Pineau (FRA)	Quick-Step	20

=== Young rider classification ===
	Rider	Team	Time
1	Roman Kreuziger (CZE)	Astana	84h 16' 42"
2	Steven Kruijswijk (NED)	Rabobank	+ 2' 23"
3	Peter Stetina (USA)	Garmin–Cervélo	+ 38' 41"
4	Jan Bakelants (BEL)	Omega Pharma–Lotto	+ 43' 39"
5	Bart De Clercq (BEL)	Omega Pharma–Lotto	+ 42' 46"
6	José Sarmiento (COL)	Acqua & Sapone	+ 1h 06' 01"
7	Marcel Wyss (SUI)	Geox–TMC	+ 1h 07' 16"
8	Diego Ulissi (ITA)	Lampre–ISD	+ 1h 20' 14"
9	Robert Kišerlovski (CRO)	Astana	+ 1h 22' 10"
10	Kevin Seeldraeyers (BEL)	Quick-Step	+ 1h 42' 22"

=== Trofeo Fast Team classification ===
	Team	Time
1	Astana	252h 44' 52"
2	Movistar Team	+ 10' 00"
3	Ag2r–La Mondiale	+ 11' 23"
4	Team Katusha	+ 24' 46"
5	Geox–TMC	+ 38' 41"
6	Saxo Bank–SunGard	+ 45' 23"
7	Omega Pharma–Lotto	+ 1h 07' 35"
8	Acqua & Sapone	+ 1h 07' 57"
9	Euskaltel–Euskadi	+ 1h 20' 35"
10	Lampre–ISD	+ 1h 24' 01"

=== Trofeo Super Team classification ===
	Team	Points
1	Lampre–ISD	338
2	Androni Giocattoli	299
3	Ag2r–La Mondiale	298
4	Movistar Team	285
5	Saxo Bank–SunGard	277
6	Ag2r–La Mondiale	221
7	HTC–Highroad	266
8	Astana	242
9	Liquigas–Cannondale	239
10	Team Katusha	202

=== Minor classifications ===
Other less well-known classifications, whose leaders did not receive a special jersey, were awarded during the Giro. These awards were based on points earned throughout the three weeks of the tour. Each mass-start stage had one intermediate sprint, the Traguardo Volante, or T.V. The T.V. gave bonus seconds towards the general classification, points towards the regular points classification, and also points towards the T.V. classification. This award was known by various names in previous years, and was previously time-based. It was won by Jan Bakelants of the Omega Pharma–Lotto team.

Other awards included the Combativity classification, which was a compilation of points gained for position on crossing intermediate sprints, mountain passes and stage finishes. Original general classification winner Alberto Contador won this award at the race's conclusion; upon his disqualification it passed to mountains category winner Stefano Garzelli. The Azzurri d'Italia classification was based on finishing order, but points were awarded only to the top three finishers in each stage. It was originally won, like the closely associated points classification, by Contador, and passed to José Rujano when the Spaniard's results were stripped. Additionally, the Trofeo Fuga Pinarello rewarded riders who took part in a breakaway at the head of the field, each rider in an escape of ten or fewer riders getting one point for each kilometre that the group stayed clear. Team RadioShack's Yaroslav Popovych was first in this competition. Teams were given penalty points for minor technical infringements. Six different teams – Liquigas–Cannondale, Androni Giocattoli, HTC–Highroad, Quick-Step, BMC Racing Team, and Colnago–CSF Inox – avoided incurring penalties over the course of the race, and so shared in winning the Fair Play classification.

=== World Rankings points ===
The Giro was one of 27 events throughout the season that contributed points towards the 2011 UCI World Tour. Points were awarded to the top 20 finishers overall, and to the top five finishers in each stage. In early 2012, the points earned by Contador for overall placing were redistributed, and those gained for stage finishes were removed. Riders from non-World Tour teams, who were not initially allocated points, received them.

Points earned in the Giro d'Italia
Name	Team	Points
Michele Scarponi (ITA)	Lampre–ISD	186
Vincenzo Nibali (ITA)	Liquigas–Cannondale	149
John Gadret (FRA)	Ag2r–La Mondiale	124
José Rujano (VEN)	Androni Giocattoli	104
Joaquim Rodríguez (ESP)	Team Katusha	103
Roman Kreuziger (CZE)	Astana	85
Denis Menchov (RUS)	Geox–TMC	61
Mikel Nieve (ESP)	Euskaltel–Euskadi	54
Steven Kruijswijk (NED)	Rabobank	52
Kanstantsin Sivtsov (BLR)	HTC–Highroad	44

Remaining points earners
Mark Cavendish (GBR)	HTC–Highroad	40
Alessandro Petacchi (ITA)	Lampre–ISD	36
Hubert Dupont (FRA)	Ag2r–La Mondiale	34
Dario Cataldo (ITA)	Quick-Step	26
Igor Antón (ESP)	Euskaltel–Euskadi	25
David Millar (GBR)	Garmin–Cervélo	24
Francisco Ventoso (ESP)	Movistar Team	24
Paolo Tiralongo (ITA)	Astana	23
David Arroyo (ESP)	Movistar Team	22
Christophe Le Mével (FRA)	Garmin–Cervélo	21
Eros Capecchi (ITA)	Liquigas–Cannondale	16
Bart De Clercq (BEL)	Omega Pharma–Lotto	16
Vasil Kiryienka (BLR)	Movistar Team	16
Diego Ulissi (ITA)	Lampre–ISD	16
Pieter Weening (NED)	Rabobank	16
Johann Tschopp (SUI)	BMC Racing Team	14
Pablo Lastras (ESP)	Movistar Team	12
Davide Appollonio (ITA)	Team Sky	10
Matteo Carrara (ITA)	Vacansoleil–DCM	10
Marco Pinotti (ITA)	HTC–Highroad	8
Alex Rasmussen (DEN)	HTC–Highroad	8
Tiago Machado (POR)	Team RadioShack	4
Kevin Seeldraeyers (BEL)	Quick-Step	4
Jan Bakelants (BEL)	Omega Pharma–Lotto	2
Danilo Di Luca (ITA)	Team Katusha	2
Alexander Kristoff (NOR)	BMC Racing Team	2
Thomas Löfkvist (SWE)	Team Sky	2
Daniel Moreno (ESP)	Team Katusha	2
Richie Porte (AUS)	Saxo Bank–SunGard	2
Borut Božič (SLO)	Vacansoleil–DCM	1
Gerald Ciolek (GER)	Quick-Step	1
Yaroslav Popovych (UKR)	Team RadioShack	1
