= Paolo Tiralongo =

Italian road bicycle racer

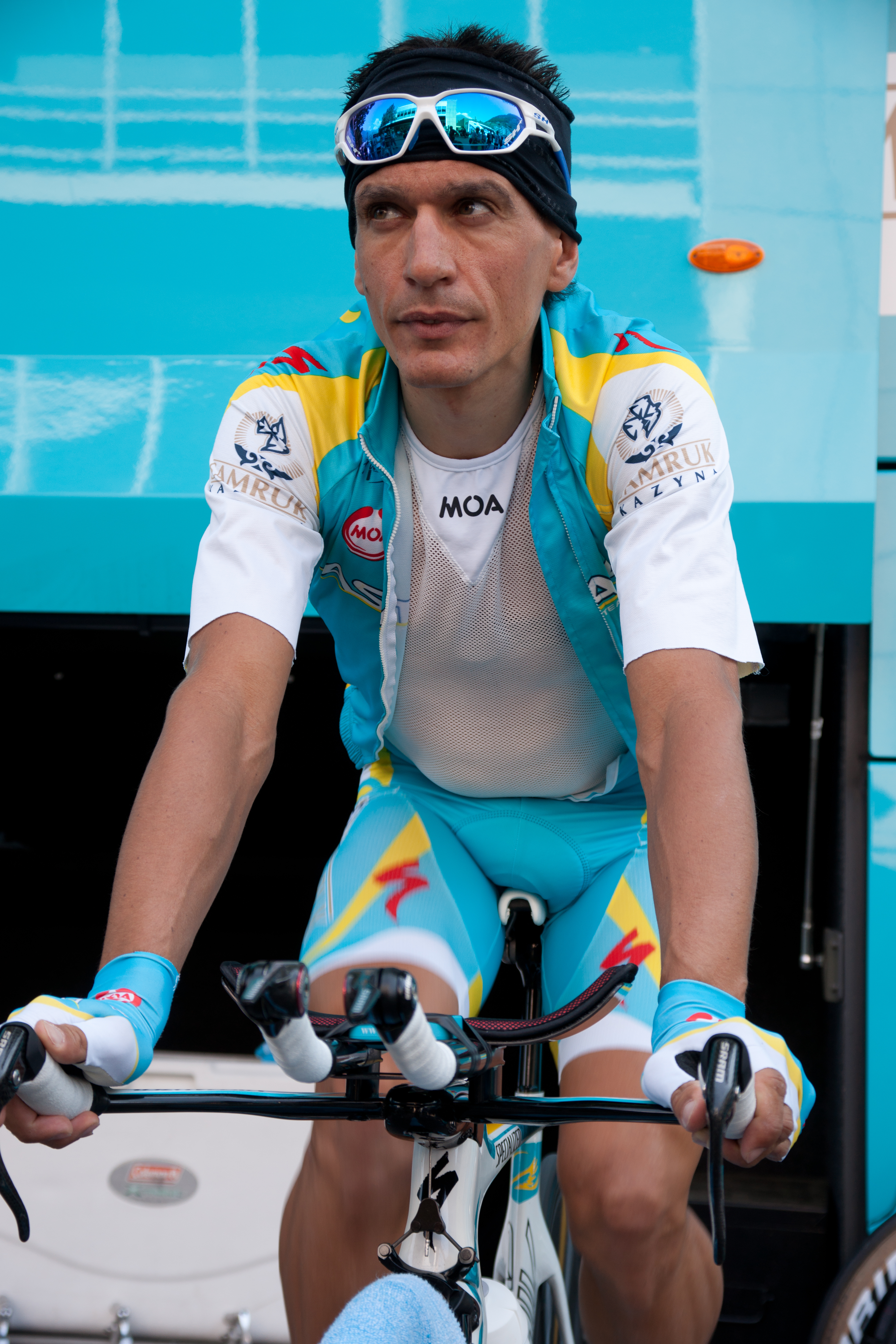
- Tiralongo at the 2011 Tour de Romandie

Personal information
- Full name: Paolo Tiralongo
- Nickname: L'Ape di Avola (The Bee from Avola)
- Born: 8 July 1977 (age 49) Avola, Italy
- Height: 1.68 m (5 ft 6 in)
- Weight: 56 kg (123 lb)

Cycling career
- Sport: Cycling
- Discipline: Road
- Role: Rider
- Rider type: Climbing specialist

Professional teams
- 2000–2002: Fassa Bortolo
- 2003–2005: Ceramiche Panaria–Fiordo
- 2006–2009: Lampre–Fondital
- 2010–2017: Astana

Major wins
- Grand Tours Giro d'Italia 3 individual stages (2011, 2012, 2015) Vuelta a España 1 TTT stage (2013)

Paolo Tiralongo (born 8 July 1977) is an Italian former professional road bicycle racer, who rode professionally between 2000 and 2017 for the Fassa Bortolo, Ceramica Panaria–Navigare, Lampre–NGC and Astana teams.

== Career ==
In 2009, while riding for Lampre–NGC, Tiralongo registered his best final result on a Grand Tour, finishing the Vuelta a España in eighth position after riding consistently in the mountain stages. He conceded a little over nine minutes to the victor, Spaniard Alejandro Valverde of Caisse d'Epargne. He joined Astana for the 2010 season, on a two-year contract. In 2011, Tiralongo took a notable victory on stage 19 of the Giro d'Italia, a summit finish to Macugnaga. He attacked in the final kilometers and went clear of the lead group, but was joined by Alberto Contador (Saxo Bank–SunGard) in the final few meters. He came first on the line, taking his first victory in more than ten years.

In 2012, he won another stage in the Giro d'Italia, stage 7, which was a hilltop finish atop Rocca di Cambio. With 500 meters to go, Tiralongo followed an attack initiated by Michele Scarponi of Lampre–ISD and he passed Scarponi inside of the final 100 meters. He lay on the ground afterward, out of breath.

On 24 April 2015, Tiralongo collected his first victory of the season in the final stage of the Giro del Trentino. He passed the last climb (Passo Predaia) with a small leading group and won the sprint after the descent. On 17 May, he won Stage 9 of the 2015 Giro d'Italia.

== Major results ==
1998
1st Gran Premio di Poggiana
3rd Overall Giro Ciclistico d'Italia
1999
1st Overall Triptyque Ardennais
3rd Road race, National Under-23 Road Championships
2001
2nd Trofeo dello Scalatore III
3rd Overall Tour of Austria
6th Gran Premio della Costa Etruschi
8th Giro della Provincia di Siracusa
9th GP Industria & Artigianato di Larciano
10th Trofeo dello Scalatore I
2002
2nd Overall Tour Méditerranéen
6th Overall Brixia Tour
8th Coppa Ugo Agostoni
10th Trofeo Pantalica
2003
8th Overall Settimana Internazionale di Coppi e Bartali
10th Overall Giro del Trentino
10th Giro dell'Appennino
2004
1st Mountains classification Tour Down Under
2nd Overall Brixia Tour
2nd Trofeo Melinda
2nd GP Citta di Rio Saliceto e Correggio
5th Giro del Medio Brenta
7th Tre Valli Varesine
7th Giro della Romagna
8th Giro del Veneto
2005
3rd Milano–Torino
3rd Trofeo Laigueglia
6th Overall Settimana Internazionale di Coppi e Bartali
6th Gran Premio Fred Mengoni
8th Giro d'Oro
2008
6th Klasika Primavera
2009
8th Overall Vuelta a España
10th Giro dell'Emilia
2011
1st Stage 19 Giro d'Italia
2012
1st Stage 7 Giro d'Italia
2013
1st Stage 1 (TTT) Vuelta a España
2014
9th Overall Vuelta a Burgos
2015
1st Stage 4 Giro del Trentino
1st Stage 9 Giro d'Italia

=== Grand Tour general classification results timeline ===
Grand Tour	2000	2001	2002	2003	2004	2005	2006	2007	2008	2009	2010	2011	2012	2013	2014	2015	2016	2017
Giro d'Italia	—	—	—	DNF	—	32	15	26	—	37	DNF	18	23	99	45	19	—	83
Tour de France	—	—	—	—	—	—	69	—	46	—	53	DNF	—	—	—	—	74	—
Vuelta a España	96	—	43	—	—	—	—	DNF	27	8	—	—	38	51	33	DNF	—	—

Legend
—	Did not compete
DNF	Did not finish
