= Monte Crostis =

Mountain in the Carnic Alps

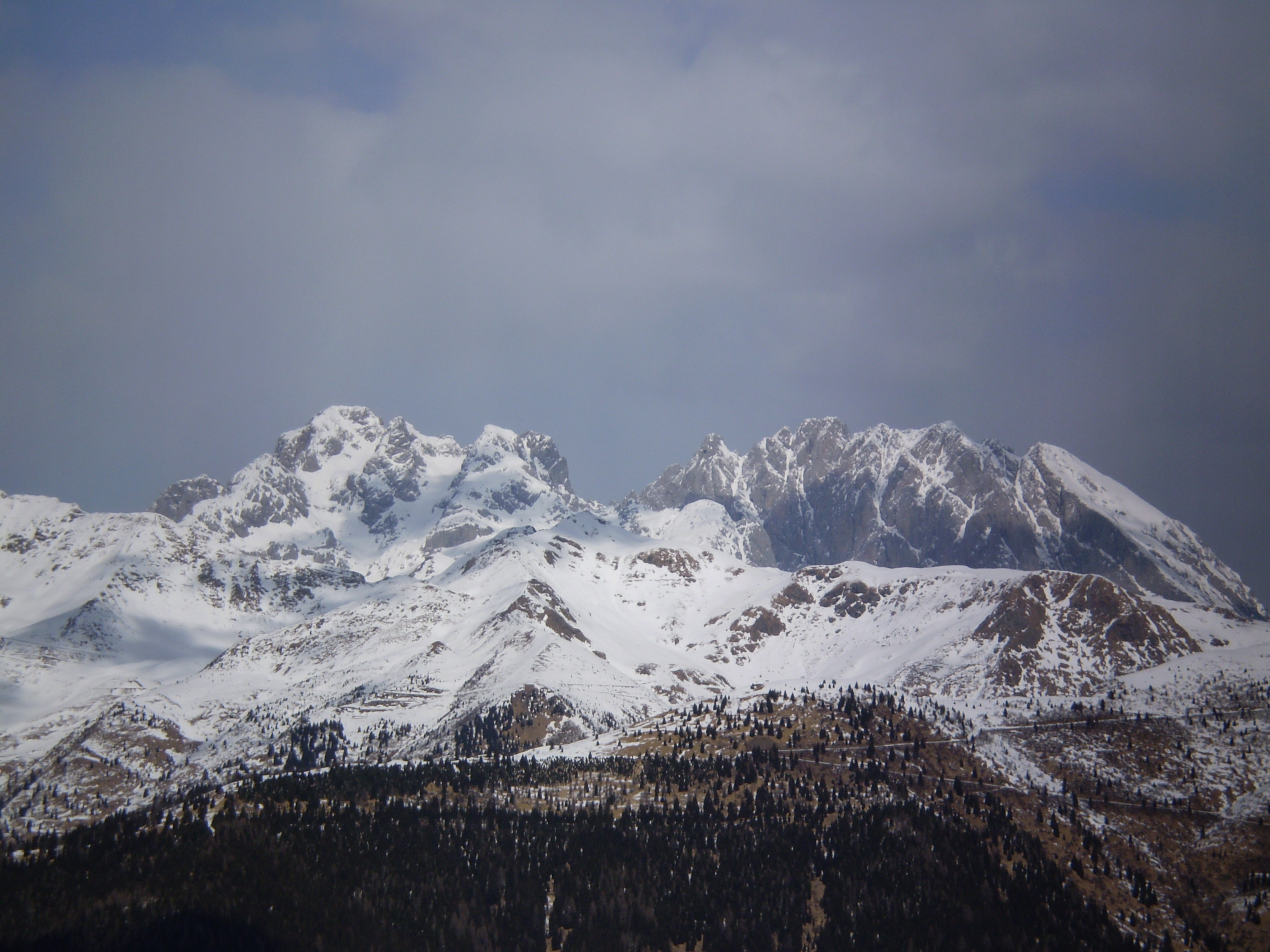
- View from Zoncolan towards the north, featuring Coglians, and Mount Crostis in the foreground.

Highest point
- Elevation: 2,251 m (7,385 ft)
- Prominence: 274 metres (899 ft)
- Coordinates: 46°35′49″N 12°53′28″E

Geography
- Location within Alps
- Location: Italy
- Parent range: Carnic Alps

Monte Crostis (el.2,251 metres (7,385 ft)) is a mountain in the Carnic Alps, located in the region of Friuli-Venezia Giulia, Italy. It is located in the alpine region of Carnia, in the province of Udine. It is a popular destination for hikers, offering a breathtaking panoramic view of the entire Carnic Alps, extending to the Julian Alps in the east and the Dolomites in the west. The peak is accessible via a short hike from the car park on the Panoramica delle Vette road at the end of the ascent from Tualis.

== Cycling ==
The ascent is one of the most challenging in the Alps and the Carnic region, following the Zoncolan, with an average gradient of approximately 10% over a distance of 14 kilometres (46,000 ft).

The Giro d'Italia intended to pass Monte Crostis in 2011, but after the death of Wouter Weylandt and ongoing protests of the peloton, the jury decided to remove the Crostis from the route.
