= Wilga =

Wilga can refer to:

== Places ==
- Wilga, Masovian Voivodeship (east-central Poland)
- Wilga, Western Australia, a town in Western Australia
- Wilga West, Western Australia, a locality in the Shire of Donnybrook–Balingup
- Wilga, Burkina Faso, a town in Burkina Faso
- Wilga or Il-Wilga is a zone in Għarb, Gozo, Malta
- Wilga Road, Welwyn, Hertfordshire, England

== Rivers ==
- Wilga (Garwolin), a river in Garwolin county, Poland
- Wilga (Krakow), a river that joins the Vistula in Krakow, Poland

== Other ==
- Wilga (tree), a small tree of Australia
- PZL-104 Wilga, a Polish plane
- wilga, a domed shelter of Wilga twigs made by some Australian Aboriginal peoples
- ST Wilga, a tugboat
