= Vistulan Boulevards =

Vistulan Boulevards may refer to:

- Vistulan Boulevards, Kraków
- Vistulan Boulevards, Warsaw
