= Wilga (Krakow) =

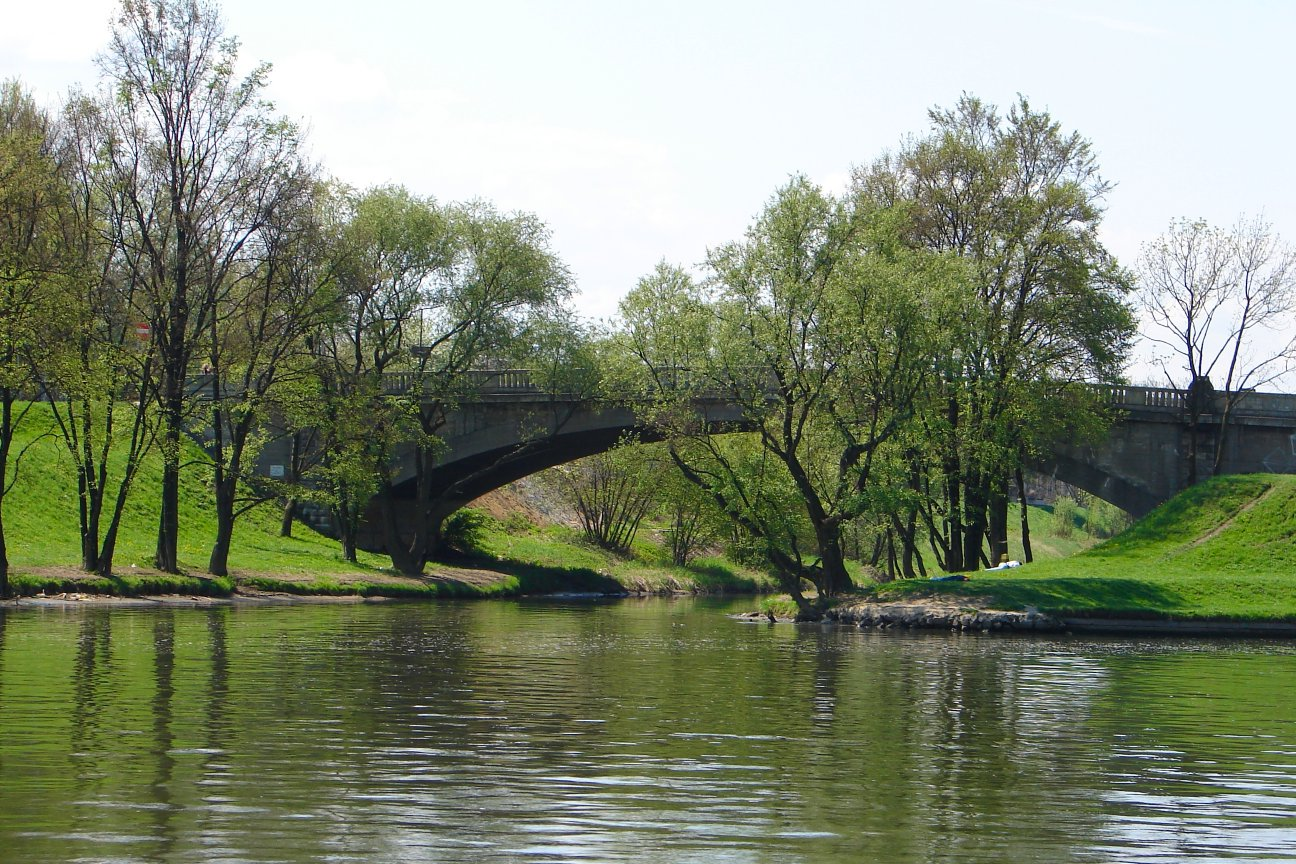
- River mouth at Retmański Bridge

- Location within Poland

Physical characteristics
- Source
  - location: Raciborsko, Lesser Poland Voivodeship
  - elevation: 370 m (1,210 ft)
- Mouth
  - location: Kraków, Lesser Poland Voivodeship
  - coordinates: 50.0443°N 19.9412°E
  - elevation: 198.9 m (653 ft)
- Length: 25 km (16 mi)
- Basin size: 101.1 km (62.8 mi)
- Discharge
  - average: 1.3 m^{3}/s (46 cu ft/s)

Basin features
- Progression: Vistula→ Baltic Sea

Wilga is a river in the Lesser Poland Voivodeship of Poland. The right tributary of the Vistula River, it feeds off in Kraków on Volyn Boulevard.

In the upper reaches of the river there are minnows, chubs and a few brook trouts.

The sources are at 370 metres (1,210 ft) elevation in Raciborsko village, Wieliczka County in the Wieliczka Foothills. The river drains the Wieliczka Foothills and its mains, mainly built of Flysch works. The river is heavily meandering, regulated in Kraków, up to 1.2 kilometres (0.75 mi) from the estuary protected by levees. Severely polluted, especially on the estuarian section Wilga is classified in the lower grades of water quality.

Right at the mouth of the river is the Retmański Bridge.

== See also ==
- List of rivers of Poland
