= 2013 Tour de Pologne =

2013 UCI World Tour, race 20 of 28

Race details
- Dates: 27 July – 3 August 2013
- Stages: 7
- Distance: 1,238 km (769 mi)
- Winning time: 31h 58' 07"

Results
Jersey awarded to the overall winner	Winner	Pieter Weening (Netherlands)	(Orica–GreenEDGE)
	Second	Jon Izagirre (Spain)	(Euskaltel–Euskadi)
	Third	Christophe Riblon (France)	(Ag2r–La Mondiale)
Jersey awarded to the points classification winner	Points	Rafał Majka (Poland)	(Saxo–Tinkoff)
Jersey awarded to the mountains classification winner	Mountains	Tomasz Marczyński (Poland)	(Vacansoleil–DCM)
Jersey awarded to the sprints classification winner	Sprints	Bartosz Huzarski (Poland)	(NetApp–Endura)
	Team	RadioShack–Leopard	

The 2013 Tour de Pologne was the 70th running of the Tour de Pologne cycling stage race. It started on 27 July in Rovereto, Italy – as part of two stages in the country – and ended on 3 August in Kraków, Poland, after seven stages. It was the twentieth race of the 2013 UCI World Tour season.

The race was won by Orica–GreenEDGE rider Pieter Weening of the Netherlands, after gaining enough time on the final time trial stage to move ahead of the previous race leader Christophe Riblon of the Ag2r–La Mondiale squad. Weening – runner-up to Kim Kirchen in the 2005 edition of the race – had trailed by 27 seconds (in fifth place) going into the stage, but overturned this disadvantage to eventually win the race by 13 seconds over Euskaltel–Euskadi's Jon Izagirre, who also moved ahead of Riblon on the final stage. Riblon – the winner of the race's queen stage, the second stage, to the Passo Pordoi in Trentino – ultimately completed the podium, three seconds down on Izagirre, and sixteen in arrears of Weening.

The race's other jerseys all went to Polish riders; the points classification went to Saxo–Tinkoff rider Rafał Majka, who finished as the best-placed Polish rider in fourth place, and led the race for three days due to his consistent finishing in the first half of the race. For the second year in succession, Tomasz Marczyński won the mountains classification for Vacansoleil–DCM, while Bartosz Huzarski was the winner of the intermediate sprints classification for NetApp–Endura. The teams classification was comfortably won by RadioShack–Leopard, finishing nearly twenty minutes clear of the next best team, Cannondale.

== Schedule ==
Stage characteristics and winners
Stage	Date	Route	Distance	Type	Winner
1	27 July	Rovereto (Italy) to Madonna di Campiglio (Italy)	184.5 km (114.6 mi)	Mountain stage	Diego Ulissi (ITA)
2	28 July	Marilleva–Val di Sole (Italy) to Passo Pordoi–Val di Fassa (Italy)	206.5 km (128.3 mi)	Mountain stage	Christophe Riblon (FRA)
	29 July	Rest day			
3	30 July	Kraków to Rzeszów	226 km (140.4 mi)	Flat stage	Thor Hushovd (NOR)
4	31 July	Tarnów to Katowice	231.5 km (143.8 mi)	Medium-mountain stage	Taylor Phinney (USA)
5	1 August	Nowy Targ to Zakopane	160.5 km (99.7 mi)	Mountain stage	Thor Hushovd (NOR)
6	2 August	Terma Bukowina Tatrzańska to Bukowina Tatrzańska	192 km (119.3 mi)	Mountain stage	Darwin Atapuma (COL)
7	3 August	Wieliczka to Kraków	37 km (23.0 mi)	Individual time trial	Bradley Wiggins (GBR)

== Participating teams ==
As the Tour de Pologne was a UCI World Tour event, all nineteen UCI ProTeams were invited automatically and obligated to send a squad. Along with Team Poland – the Polish national team – three other squads were given wildcard places into the race, and as such, formed the event's 23-team peloton. Each team entered six riders, as part of a pilot project launched by the Union Cycliste Internationale (UCI), thus forming a maximum field of 138 riders, which included 2013 Giro d'Italia winner Vincenzo Nibali, 2012 Tour de France winner Bradley Wiggins, and Grand Tour stage winners Ivan Basso, Fabian Cancellara, Michele Scarponi, Rigoberto Urán and Thor Hushovd. The only previous winner in the starting field was Garmin–Sharp's Johan Vansummeren, who won the race in 2007.

The twenty-three teams that competed in the race were:

- Ag2r–La Mondiale
- Argos–Shimano
- Astana
- Belkin Pro Cycling
- BMC Racing Team
- Cannondale
- CCC–Polsat–Polkowice
- Colombia
- Euskaltel–Euskadi
- FDJ.fr
- Garmin–Sharp
- Team Katusha
- Lampre–Merida
- Lotto–Belisol
- Movistar Team
- NetApp–Endura
- Omega Pharma–Quick-Step
- Orica–GreenEDGE
- Team Poland (national team)
- RadioShack–Leopard
- Saxo–Tinkoff
- Team Sky
- Vacansoleil–DCM

== Stages ==
=== Stage 1 ===
27 July 2013 — Rovereto (Italy) to Madonna di Campiglio (Italy), 184.5 km (114.6 mi)

For the 70th edition of the Tour de Pologne, race organisers elected to move the first stage outside Poland for the first time in its history, with the race starting in the city of Rovereto in the Trentino region of Italy; it marked the first time that a foreign UCI World Tour race had started in Italy. The first stage was relatively flat for the opening quarter of the stage, before the first climb of the race, the first-category pass at Fai della Paganella in the Dolomites. A long descent towards the midpoint of the stage followed, through Riva del Garda, before the road steadily rose again towards the second categorised climb. The Passo del Durone summited with around 40 km (24.9 mi) remaining, and after a sharp descent, the road kicked up gradually towards the final, first-category climb to Madonna di Campiglio. Although only averaging just over 5%, the 11 km (6.8 mi)-long climb was still expected to cause damage within the field, with a false flat run-in on cobbles in the village itself.

Almost immediately after the start, six riders formed the day's breakaway; the group consisted of Astana rider Valerio Agnoli, NetApp–Endura's Bartosz Huzarski, Bartłomiej Matysiak of CCC–Polsat–Polkowice, Serge Pauwels (Omega Pharma–Quick-Step), Cédric Pineau of FDJ.fr and BMC Racing Team's Marco Pinotti. The sextet would ultimately build up a lead which reached a maximum of nine minutes during the early running. The first two categorised climbs would split the break up; Agnoli and Matysiak were dropped on the first, while the Passo del Durone put paid to the chances of Pineau and Pinotti. Pauwels and Huzarski were able to maintain an advantage of approaching two minutes as they hit the final ascent towards Madonna di Campiglio, where Pauwels dropped Huzarski on the lower slopes, before the peloton brought them back. Cannondale led the peloton up the climb, before the counter-attacks began in earnest.

Vacansoleil–DCM were attentive on the climb, as two of their riders – Tomasz Marczyński and Rafael Valls – pulling clear of the peloton around halfway up, with Alex Howes of the Garmin–Sharp squad providing assistance. They were brought back shortly after, before Orica–GreenEDGE's Pieter Weening launched a solo attack on the peloton. Weening built up a lead of more than half a minute, on a vastly diminished group of riders, which did not include race favourites Vincenzo Nibali (Astana) or Team Sky rider Bradley Wiggins. Movistar Team rider Eros Capecchi and Chris Anker Sørensen of Saxo–Tinkoff were able to bridge up to Weening – having dropped companion Robert Kišerlovski (RadioShack–Leopard) in the process – before the top of the climb, although Weening was able to kick again in the closing stages. He was caught inside the final 500 m (1,600 ft), with the reduced group battling out the stage honours in a sprint for the line; ultimately, it was Lampre–Merida's Diego Ulissi who finished strongest, to take the stage victory ahead of Colombia's Darwin Atapuma, and Sørensen's team-mate Rafał Majka, the best placed Polish rider.

Stage 1 Result

	Rider	Team	Time
1	Diego Ulissi (ITA)	Lampre–Merida	4h 59' 32"
2	Darwin Atapuma (COL)	Colombia	s.t.
3	Rafał Majka (POL)	Saxo–Tinkoff	s.t.
4	Eros Capecchi (ITA)	Movistar Team	s.t.
5	Ivan Basso (ITA)	Cannondale	s.t.
6	Domenico Pozzovivo (ITA)	Ag2r–La Mondiale	s.t.
7	Jon Izagirre (ESP)	Euskaltel–Euskadi	s.t.
8	Alex Howes (USA)	Garmin–Sharp	s.t.
9	Ben Hermans (BEL)	RadioShack–Leopard	s.t.
10	Pieter Weening (NED)	Orica–GreenEDGE	s.t.

General Classification after Stage 1

	Rider	Team	Time
1	Diego Ulissi (ITA)	Lampre–Merida	4h 59' 22"
2	Darwin Atapuma (COL)	Colombia	+ 4"
3	Rafał Majka (POL)	Saxo–Tinkoff	+ 6"
4	Eros Capecchi (ITA)	Movistar Team	+ 10"
5	Ivan Basso (ITA)	Cannondale	+ 10"
6	Domenico Pozzovivo (ITA)	Ag2r–La Mondiale	+ 10"
7	Jon Izagirre (ESP)	Euskaltel–Euskadi	+ 10"
8	Alex Howes (USA)	Garmin–Sharp	+ 10"
9	Ben Hermans (BEL)	RadioShack–Leopard	+ 10"
10	Pieter Weening (NED)	Orica–GreenEDGE	+ 10"

=== Stage 2 ===
28 July 2013 — Marilleva–Val di Sole (Italy) to Passo Pordoi–Val di Fassa (Italy), 206.5 km (128.3 mi)

The second of the opening weekend's stages in Italy was regarded as the queen stage of the 2013 Tour de Pologne. On the parcours of 206.5 km (128.3 mi), there were three categorised climbs – each one being designated as a first-category ascent – all of which came within the final third of the stage. After an undulating start out of Marilleva in the Val di Sole, the peloton passed through all three of the day's intermediate sprints prior to reaching the foot of the first climb, passing the points in Fondo, Cembra and Cavalese respectively. The first climb was the Passo di Pampeago, which hosted a stage finish of the 2012 Giro d'Italia; after summiting the climb at over 2,000 metres (6,600 ft), the riders descended towards Ponte Nova, and the bottom of the second climb, the Passo di Costalunga, with ramps of up to 21%. From a steady descent, the road gradually rose towards the Passo Pordoi; a climb averaging 6.8%, but reaching 16% in places. The mountain points were on offer at 2,100 metres (6,900 ft), but the race continued on for another 2.5 km (1.6 mi), finishing at 2,239 metres (7,346 ft) above sea level.

During the early kilometres of the stage, a group – which at one point, topped out at sixteen riders – were able to go clear to form the breakaway of the day. With Lampre–Merida and Colombia pacing the peloton for the leaders overall, Diego Ulissi and Darwin Atapuma, the lead group were able to accumulate a lead of over five minutes at one point during the stage. At the intermediate sprints, NetApp–Endura's Bartosz Huzarski was able to extend his lead in the classification, by being first across the line at two of the three points, with a second place at the other. The group split apart on the Passo di Pampeago; after an attack by Astana's Vincenzo Nibali – having lost nine minutes on the opening stage – the group was reduced to six riders, with it now consisting of Polish riders Tomasz Marczyński (Vacansoleil–DCM) and Maciej Paterski (Cannondale), Tour de France stage winner Christophe Riblon of Ag2r–La Mondiale, Omega Pharma–Quick-Step's Zdeněk Štybar, RadioShack–Leopard rider Thomas Rohregger and Georg Preidler of the Argos–Shimano team. Nibali himself was dropped, and ultimately lost 23' 44" on the stage.

Ulissi got into difficulty on the day's second climb, and was soon shelled out of the back of the main group, as the Movistar Team took over pace-setting as the field moved towards the Passo Pordoi. The Polish contingent of the leaders attacked first on the climb, but Rohregger and Riblon were able to bridge up to them, before Riblon set off on his own up the ascent, with around 8 km (5.0 mi) remaining. Quickly gaining time on his rivals, Riblon – only competing in the race following an injury to Jean-Christophe Péraud at the Tour de France – remained in the saddle all the way up the climb, and would ultimately go on to take his second queen stage success in the space of two weeks, following on from his win at Alpe d'Huez. Rohregger crossed the line second, just over a minute behind with Preidler in third. Team Sky's Sergio Henao and Rafał Majka of Saxo–Tinkoff led the main field home at 1' 35" down, and despite the time bonuses that Riblon and Rohregger received – both for their stage finishes and the "attractivity" standings for the stage – Majka assumed the race lead, by four seconds from Henao, before the race's return to Polish soil, via the rest day.

Stage 2 Result

	Rider	Team	Time
1	Christophe Riblon (FRA)	Ag2r–La Mondiale	6h 03' 40"
2	Thomas Rohregger (AUT)	RadioShack–Leopard	+ 1' 02"
3	Georg Preidler (AUT)	Argos–Shimano	+ 1' 18"
4	Sergio Henao (COL)	Team Sky	+ 1' 35"
5	Rafał Majka (POL)	Saxo–Tinkoff	+ 1' 35"
6	Pieter Weening (NED)	Orica–GreenEDGE	+ 1' 38"
7	Chris Anker Sørensen (DEN)	Saxo–Tinkoff	+ 1' 40"
8	Jon Izagirre (ESP)	Euskaltel–Euskadi	+ 1' 40"
9	Domenico Pozzovivo (ITA)	Ag2r–La Mondiale	+ 1' 44"
10	Eros Capecchi (ITA)	Movistar Team	+ 1' 44"

General Classification after Stage 2

	Rider	Team	Time
1	Rafał Majka (POL)	Saxo–Tinkoff	11h 04' 43"
2	Sergio Henao (COL)	Team Sky	+ 4"
3	Christophe Riblon (FRA)	Ag2r–La Mondiale	+ 6"
4	Pieter Weening (NED)	Orica–GreenEDGE	+ 7"
5	Jon Izagirre (ESP)	Euskaltel–Euskadi	+ 9"
6	Chris Anker Sørensen (DEN)	Saxo–Tinkoff	+ 9"
7	Eros Capecchi (ITA)	Movistar Team	+ 13"
8	Domenico Pozzovivo (ITA)	Ag2r–La Mondiale	+ 13"
9	Robert Kišerlovski (CRO)	RadioShack–Leopard	+ 16"
10	Thomas Rohregger (AUT)	RadioShack–Leopard	+ 18"

=== Stage 3 ===
30 July 2013 — Kraków to Rzeszów, 226 km (140.4 mi)

The race resumed after the rest day with a stage predominantly suited towards the sprinters that had elected to compete in the race. Starting in Kraków, the parcours of 226 km (140.4 mi) was run entirely between 200 and 400 metres above sea level, with several, short climbs; despite this, there was only one categorised climb throughout the day, a third-category ascent in the village of Lubenia, around 35 km (21.7 mi) before the conclusion of the stage in Rzeszów. A finishing circuit was also utilised in Rzeszów; three laps of a circuit 6 km (3.7 mi) in length were to be completed, to round off the day's running. Weather conditions were also expected to play a factor in the running of the stage, with spells of rain throughout the day.

After several riders hit the tarmac in the opening kilometres due to the expected rain materialising, a four-rider breakaway move was eventually able to be established, with the quartet made up of Astana rider Alexsandr Dyachenko, Euskaltel–Euskadi's Ricardo Mestre, Mirko Selvaggi (Vacansoleil–DCM), and Bartłomiej Matysiak, representing the home CCC–Polsat–Polkowice team. The quartet were able to build up a lead in excess of ten minutes at one point during the stage, before the teams of the sprinters soon stepped up the pace at the front of the peloton. The gap had been halved by the 60 km (37.3 mi) to go mark, and was down to 1' 30", by the time that the leaders reached the finishing circuit in Rzeszów. Matysiak had taken maximum points out on the road, at the two intermediate sprints – coming at Strzyżów and Lubenia respectively – on the course, as well as at the third-category ascent in Lubenia.

Despite the pace that the BMC Racing Team were setting on the front of the main field, the lead group were managing to resist being caught, with Selvaggi setting the tempo for the leaders as they were circling in Rzeszów. At the start of the final circuit, Dyachenko attacked his companions, with the peloton now inside of half a minute behind the quartet. The catch was made with around 1.5 km (0.9 mi) remaining of the stage, setting up the sprint finish. Belkin Pro Cycling led into the final kilometre for Mark Renshaw, but Taylor Phinney moved up the line, to set tempo for team-mate Thor Hushovd; Renshaw was therefore forced to launch his sprint first to get around Hushovd, but Hushovd was able to hit the line first to take his first victory at World Tour level since the 2011 Tour de France. Renshaw was able to get the better of Garmin–Sharp's Steele Von Hoff for second place, while Rafał Majka was able to maintain his four-second lead in the general classification for Saxo–Tinkoff.

Stage 3 Result

	Rider	Team	Time
1	Thor Hushovd (NOR)	BMC Racing Team	5h 10' 02"
2	Mark Renshaw (AUS)	Belkin Pro Cycling	s.t.
3	Steele Von Hoff (AUS)	Garmin–Sharp	s.t.
4	Grega Bole (SLO)	Vacansoleil–DCM	s.t.
5	Tosh Van der Sande (BEL)	Lotto–Belisol	s.t.
6	Leigh Howard (AUS)	Orica–GreenEDGE	s.t.
7	Michał Gołaś (POL)	Omega Pharma–Quick-Step	s.t.
8	Yauheni Hutarovich (BLR)	Ag2r–La Mondiale	s.t.
9	Ben Swift (GBR)	Team Sky	s.t.
10	Luka Mezgec (SLO)	Argos–Shimano	s.t.

General Classification after Stage 3

	Rider	Team	Time
1	Rafał Majka (POL)	Saxo–Tinkoff	16h 14' 45"
2	Sergio Henao (COL)	Team Sky	+ 4"
3	Christophe Riblon (FRA)	Ag2r–La Mondiale	+ 6"
4	Pieter Weening (NED)	Orica–GreenEDGE	+ 7"
5	Jon Izagirre (ESP)	Euskaltel–Euskadi	+ 9"
6	Chris Anker Sørensen (DEN)	Saxo–Tinkoff	+ 9"
7	Domenico Pozzovivo (ITA)	Ag2r–La Mondiale	+ 13"
8	Eros Capecchi (ITA)	Movistar Team	+ 13"
9	Robert Kišerlovski (CRO)	RadioShack–Leopard	+ 16"
10	Thomas Rohregger (AUT)	RadioShack–Leopard	+ 18"

=== Stage 4 ===
31 July 2013 — Tarnów to Katowice, 231.5 km (143.8 mi)

With a parcours of 231.5 km (143.8 mi), the fourth stage of the Tour de Pologne was also its longest for the 2013 edition. Having gone in an easterly direction out of Kraków the previous day, the race returned to the west once again. Starting in Tarnów, the early kilometres of the stage were relatively flat, before some rolling terrain was negotiated in the middle portion of the route; there was only one categorised climb on the day, but this did not occur until the riders had reached Katowice. Three intermediate sprints were also held during the stage, offering up bonus time towards the general classification; these came at Szczurowa, Olkusz and Siemianowice Śląskie respectively. A finishing circuit was again utilised, with four laps of a circuit 12.3 km (7.6 mi) in length to be completed in Katowice.

Eight riders from seven different teams were able to get out front and form the day's primary breakaway, but none of the octet were a threat the lead of Saxo–Tinkoff rider Rafał Majka in the general classification. Despite this, the peloton did not allow for a substantial gap to be created on the road, with the maximum advantage remaining beneath five minutes for the entire stage. The advantage had reduced to around 90 seconds, by the time that the leaders reaching Katowice for the finishing circuits; CCC–Polsat–Polkowice's Jacek Morajko had picked up most points at the intermediate sprints, taking two victories and a second place for a tally of eight. Kamil Gradek, riding for a Polish selective team picked up the other first-place finish at a sprint, winning at Olkusz.

With the peloton still cutting into the lead that the group of eight riders had held up front, Gradek launched a solo attack with two laps to cover. He held a lead of 45 seconds into the penultimate circuit, but the main field continued to eat into his lead by the kilometre; not long after he had taken the bell to start the final lap, Gradek's move was neutralised by the peloton. After a similar move by Astana rider Valerio Agnoli resulted in a neutralisation as well, Taylor Phinney attacked with around 7.5 km (4.7 mi) remaining for the BMC Racing Team. A former under-23 world time trial champion, Phinney was able to gain about fifteen seconds of an advantage into the final kilometre, and despite the peloton closing in at a vast rate, he held on to take the first road race victory of his professional career. Garmin–Sharp's Steele Von Hoff added a second place, to his third place from the previous stage – and took the points classification lead, from Majka – while Yauheni Hutarovich completed the top three for Ag2r–La Mondiale.

Stage 4 Result

	Rider	Team	Time
1	Taylor Phinney (USA)	BMC Racing Team	5h 40' 17"
2	Steele Von Hoff (AUS)	Garmin–Sharp	s.t.
3	Yauheni Hutarovich (BLR)	Ag2r–La Mondiale	s.t.
4	Aidis Kruopis (LTU)	Orica–GreenEDGE	s.t.
5	Reinardt Janse van Rensburg (RSA)	Argos–Shimano	s.t.
6	Thor Hushovd (NOR)	BMC Racing Team	s.t.
7	Luka Mezgec (SLO)	Argos–Shimano	s.t.
8	Bartłomiej Matysiak (POL)	CCC–Polsat–Polkowice	s.t.
9	Daniele Ratto (ITA)	Cannondale	s.t.
10	Daniel Schorn (AUT)	NetApp–Endura	s.t.

General Classification after Stage 4

	Rider	Team	Time
1	Rafał Majka (POL)	Saxo–Tinkoff	21h 55' 02"
2	Sergio Henao (COL)	Team Sky	+ 4"
3	Christophe Riblon (FRA)	Ag2r–La Mondiale	+ 6"
4	Pieter Weening (NED)	Orica–GreenEDGE	+ 7"
5	Jon Izagirre (ESP)	Euskaltel–Euskadi	+ 9"
6	Chris Anker Sørensen (DEN)	Saxo–Tinkoff	+ 9"
7	Domenico Pozzovivo (ITA)	Ag2r–La Mondiale	+ 13"
8	Eros Capecchi (ITA)	Movistar Team	+ 13"
9	Robert Kišerlovski (CRO)	RadioShack–Leopard	+ 16"
10	Thomas Rohregger (AUT)	RadioShack–Leopard	+ 18"

=== Stage 5 ===
1 August 2013 — Nowy Targ to Zakopane, 160.5 km (99.7 mi)

After the two predicted sprint stages had both fallen the way of BMC Racing Team riders, the fifth stage was designed to eliminate the pure sprinters with a hilly parcours of 160.5 km (99.7 mi) in length. On the route, there were a total of six categorised climbs; the first-category ascent at Łapszanka was only climbed once, ahead of the peloton moving into a lengthy, finishing circuit around Zakopane. It entered the circuit 21.5 km (13.4 mi) around the lap of 40.5 km (25.2 mi), with another climb – the second-category Droga do Olczy – to be passed over 3.2 km (2.0 mi) before reaching the finish line, prior to two further laps of the circuit. Also included on the circuit, was the first-category Głodówka, just before halfway on the circuit. Both climbs featured in the previous edition of the Tour, when Ben Swift took the stage honours in Zakopane.

Several mini-attacks were closed down within the opening kilometres of the stage, before an eight-rider breakaway was given freedom to establish a gap on the road; the group included four Polish riders, while Colombia's Darwin Atapuma – who had finished second to Lampre–Merida rider Diego Ulissi on the opening stage – was also part of the octet. Atapuma dropped back from the leaders after the Łapszanka, as Saxo–Tinkoff were guarding the gap to the race's overall leader, Rafał Majka; Atapuma had started the day trailing Majka by just over five minutes in the general classification. The leaders' gap extended out towards five minutes with Tomasz Marczyński (Vacansoleil–DCM) accruing the most points to challenge Thomas Rohregger's lead of the mountains classification. The seven leaders entered the final lap with a lead of around one minute over the peloton, which was being led by NetApp–Endura and Colombia. The breakaway fractured ever so slightly just before the final climb of the Głodówka, with CCC–Polsat–Polkowice's Nikolay Mihaylov being the last of the seven to be caught, with around 20 km (12.4 mi) to cover.

On the descent from the climb, six riders were able to form an alliance, including Atapuma, second stage winner Christophe Riblon (Ag2r–La Mondiale) and RadioShack–Leopard rider Robert Kišerlovski; the latter pair trailing Majka by six and sixteen seconds respectively. The group were able to get as much as twenty seconds clear before Majka and his team started to pull them back, catching with 5 km (3.1 mi) to go. Jon Izagirre of Euskaltel–Euskadi led over the Droga do Olczy, before a long uphill drag to the finish; Team Sky's Rigoberto Urán tried to lead out Sergio Henao for the victory, but for the third day running, a BMC Racing Team rider took the honours. Thor Hushovd followed Henao up the road, and launched his sprint from his rear wheel, and ultimately took the stage honours by a bike length from FDJ.fr rider Mathieu Ladagnous, and Cannondale's Daniele Ratto completed the podium. Izagirre assumed the overall race lead, after acquiring ten bonus seconds, through a third place in the day's attractivity classification – he added a second place on the final Głodówka ascent, to the first place points for the Droga do Olczy – to pass Majka by one second. Hushovd picked up the white jersey as points leader from Garmin–Sharp's Steele Von Hoff, while Marczyński deposed Rohregger as mountains leader.

Stage 5 Result

	Rider	Team	Time
1	Thor Hushovd (NOR)	BMC Racing Team	3h 54' 40"
2	Mathieu Ladagnous (FRA)	FDJ.fr	s.t.
3	Daniele Ratto (ITA)	Cannondale	s.t.
4	Luka Mezgec (SLO)	Argos–Shimano	s.t.
5	David Tanner (AUS)	Belkin Pro Cycling	s.t.
6	Sergio Henao (COL)	Team Sky	s.t.
7	Diego Ulissi (ITA)	Lampre–Merida	s.t.
8	Christophe Riblon (FRA)	Ag2r–La Mondiale	s.t.
9	Reinardt Janse van Rensburg (RSA)	Argos–Shimano	s.t.
10	Georg Preidler (AUT)	Argos–Shimano	s.t.

General Classification after Stage 5

	Rider	Team	Time
1	Jon Izagirre (ESP)	Euskaltel–Euskadi	25h 49' 41"
2	Rafał Majka (POL)	Saxo–Tinkoff	+ 1"
3	Sergio Henao (COL)	Team Sky	+ 5"
4	Christophe Riblon (FRA)	Ag2r–La Mondiale	+ 7"
5	Pieter Weening (NED)	Orica–GreenEDGE	+ 8"
6	Chris Anker Sørensen (DEN)	Saxo–Tinkoff	+ 10"
7	Domenico Pozzovivo (ITA)	Ag2r–La Mondiale	+ 14"
8	Eros Capecchi (ITA)	Movistar Team	+ 14"
9	Robert Kišerlovski (CRO)	RadioShack–Leopard	+ 17"
10	Thomas Rohregger (AUT)	RadioShack–Leopard	+ 19"

=== Stage 6 ===
2 August 2013 — Terma Bukowina Tatrzańska to Bukowina Tatrzańska, 192 km (119.3 mi)

As was customary in the recent editions of the Tour de Pologne, the penultimate stage of the race involved a circuit race in and around the village of Bukowina Tatrzańska. To make up the parcours of 192 km (119.3 mi), the remainder of the peloton had to complete five laps, of a circuit 38.4 km (23.9 mi) in length, with two categorised climbs – both of which being first-category ascents – on each of the laps to be covered. Around 12 km (7.5 mi) into each lap, there was an ascent in the village of Ząb, with a maximum gradient of 11.4%, and a much steeper climb in Gliczarów Górny, with a maximum gradient of 21.5%. On the final lap of the circuit, there were double points on offer for the Gliczarów Górny ascent, which came just 12.2 km (7.6 mi) before the uncategorised 5 km (3.1 mi) uphill drag to the finish line. In total, the riders completed over 4,000 metres (13,000 ft) of climbing by stage's end.

A large group of 32 riders – around a quarter of the peloton – were able to get clear on the opening lap of the circuit, before the move splintered; Colombia's Darwin Atapuma was able to force a move along with sprints classification leader Bartosz Huzarski (NetApp–Endura), Nikolay Mihaylov of the CCC–Polsat–Polkowice team and Vacansoleil–DCM's Bert-Jan Lindeman. The quartet managed to build up a lead in excess of three minutes, but this grouping were ultimately brought back around halfway through the stage, on the third lap of the circuit. Atapuma – who had been in the breakaway the previous day, before he had to cede back to the peloton – was punchy enough to get into the second main attack of the day; a nine-rider group went clear on the stage, which was ultimately later reduced to seven riders who for the majority of the third and fourth laps and the first half of the final lap, were continually attacking and regrouping to one another.

Atapuma went on to attack on the final climb at Gliczarów Górny, taking the twenty points on offer for leading across the summit; he was closely followed by Team Katusha's Sergey Chernetskiy, who was able to catch Atapuma on the descent from the climb. This duo worked together as they closed in on the finish; while behind, Ag2r–La Mondiale rider Christophe Riblon attacked from the peloton, in the hope of acquiring the overall lead from Euskaltel–Euskadi's Jon Izagirre, ahead of the final time trial. Having dropped Chernetskiy, Atapuma was setting the pace alone until Riblon joined him, having got rid of the remnants of the breakaway before reaching him. Atapuma and Riblon remained clear of the field all the way to finish, with both riders claiming honours at the line; Atapuma took his – and his team's – first victory of 2013, while Riblon was able to gain 26 seconds on Izagirre (20 seconds on time, plus 6 for bonuses), in order to take a 19-second lead overnight, while also taking the points classification lead.

Stage 6 Result

	Rider	Team	Time
1	Darwin Atapuma (COL)	Colombia	5h 19' 36"
2	Christophe Riblon (FRA)	Ag2r–La Mondiale	+ 2"
3	Leopold König (CZE)	NetApp–Endura	+ 22"
4	Diego Ulissi (ITA)	Lampre–Merida	+ 22"
5	Rafał Majka (POL)	Saxo–Tinkoff	+ 22"
6	Pieter Weening (NED)	Orica–GreenEDGE	+ 22"
7	Jon Izagirre (ESP)	Euskaltel–Euskadi	+ 22"
8	Sergio Henao (COL)	Team Sky	+ 22"
9	Ivan Santaromita (ITA)	BMC Racing Team	+ 22"
10	José Serpa (COL)	Lampre–Merida	+ 22"

General Classification after Stage 6

	Rider	Team	Time
1	Christophe Riblon (FRA)	Ag2r–La Mondiale	31h 09' 20"
2	Jon Izagirre (ESP)	Euskaltel–Euskadi	+ 19"
3	Rafał Majka (POL)	Saxo–Tinkoff	+ 20"
4	Sergio Henao (COL)	Team Sky	+ 24"
5	Pieter Weening (NED)	Orica–GreenEDGE	+ 27"
6	Domenico Pozzovivo (ITA)	Ag2r–La Mondiale	+ 33"
7	Eros Capecchi (ITA)	Movistar Team	+ 33"
8	Robert Kišerlovski (CRO)	RadioShack–Leopard	+ 36"
9	Ivan Basso (ITA)	Cannondale	+ 40"
10	Chris Anker Sørensen (DEN)	Saxo–Tinkoff	+ 41"

=== Stage 7 ===
3 August 2013 — Wieliczka to Kraków, 37 km (23.0 mi), individual time trial (ITT)

For the first time since the 2005 edition of the race, an individual time trial was scheduled as one of the stages; just as it was in 2005, it was to be held as the race-concluding stage. On that day, Thomas Dekker was the winner of a 19 km (11.8 mi) test in Karpacz. In the 2013 edition, a time trial almost double that length was held, over an undulating parcours of 37 km (23.0 mi) in length. Starting in Wieliczka, the course went out on a 15 km (9.3 mi) loop around the town, passing through Koźmice Wielkie and Raciborsko, before heading towards the finish in Kraków, and a technical closing kilometre, with several sharp corners. With the top ten being covered overnight by 41 seconds, it set up the possibility for major changes within the standings by stage's end. As was customary of time trial stages, cyclists set off in reverse order from where they were ranked in the general classification at the end of the previous stage. Thus, Ji Cheng of Argos–Shimano, who, in 113th place, trailed overall leader Christophe Riblon (Ag2r–La Mondiale) by two hours, twenty-six minutes and fifty-four seconds, was the first rider to set off on the stage.

Although he was first to start, he was not the first rider to cross the finish in Kraków; despite starting the stage seven minutes after Ji, Taylor Phinney of the BMC Racing Team passed the six riders who started before him, and eventually crossed the line in a time of 47' 50" for the course. His time was beaten by just two riders; having held the lead for around half an hour, RadioShack–Leopard's Fabian Cancellara overhauled the time of Phinney by eighteen seconds, before both riders were well beaten by the time of Team Sky rider Bradley Wiggins, in his return to racing after withdrawing from the Giro d'Italia. He surpassed Cancellara's time at the intermediate time-check, and ultimately went on to record a time of 46' 36", beating the time of Cancellara by 56 seconds; a result that left Cancellara disappointed. It was good enough for him to take his first victory of the 2013 season, building his form ahead of the World Championships in Florence. With the stage being decided – along with Cancellara and Phinney, only Phinney's team-mate Marco Pinotti was able to get within 90 seconds of the time set by Wiggins on the course – the focus for the stage shifted towards the battle for the general classification and the overall victory.

Eros Capecchi (Movistar Team) was able to catch his two-minute man Robert Kišerlovski (RadioShack–Leopard) in the closing stages of the course, and he was able to move ahead of Ag2r–La Mondiale's Domenico Pozzovivo for sixth place overall. Orica–GreenEDGE rider Pieter Weening followed them on the course, and was putting pressure on the best times at the intermediate time-check, before fading to a sixth-place finish, 1' 44" on Wiggins' time, but setting a target for the four riders behind. Indeed, the four riders ahead of Weening in the general classification all trailed to him at the intermediate point; Sergio Henao (Team Sky) and Riblon lost 18 seconds, best Pole Rafał Majka (Saxo–Tinkoff) trailed by 24, while Euskaltel–Euskadi's Jon Izagirre lost 45 seconds. Henao faded further behind on the second half of the course, and finished nearly a minute down on Weening by the end, while Majka lost nine seconds over the same section. Izagirre's second half of the course was strongest of the contenders, but still had a deficit of 21 seconds to Weening on the stage results, and 13 in the general classification. Riblon tried his best to keep his lead to the end, but ultimately, his performance ceded 43 seconds to Weening, which meant that Weening had moved up four places in the rankings, to take the first major stage race of his career; Izagirre also passed Riblon for second place, by just three seconds. Riblon also lost the points classification on the final stage, with the white jersey passing to Majka.

Stage 7 Result

	Rider	Team	Time
1	Bradley Wiggins (GBR)	Team Sky	46' 36"
2	Fabian Cancellara (SUI)	RadioShack–Leopard	+ 56"
3	Taylor Phinney (USA)	BMC Racing Team	+ 1' 14"
4	Marco Pinotti (ITA)	BMC Racing Team	+ 1' 20"
5	Kristof Vandewalle (BEL)	Omega Pharma–Quick-Step	+ 1' 40"
6	Pieter Weening (NED)	Orica–GreenEDGE	+ 1' 44"
7	Jon Izagirre (ESP)	Euskaltel–Euskadi	+ 2' 05"
8	Dominik Nerz (GER)	BMC Racing Team	+ 2' 13"
9	Sergey Chernetskiy (RUS)	Team Katusha	+ 2' 15"
10	Rafał Majka (POL)	Saxo–Tinkoff	+ 2' 17"

Final General Classification

	Rider	Team	Time
1	Pieter Weening (NED)	Orica–GreenEDGE	31h 58' 07"
2	Jon Izagirre (ESP)	Euskaltel–Euskadi	+ 13"
3	Christophe Riblon (FRA)	Ag2r–La Mondiale	+ 16"
4	Rafał Majka (POL)	Saxo–Tinkoff	+ 26"
5	Sergio Henao (COL)	Team Sky	+ 51"
6	Eros Capecchi (ITA)	Movistar Team	+ 51"
7	Domenico Pozzovivo (ITA)	Ag2r–La Mondiale	+ 1' 14"
8	Ivan Basso (ITA)	Cannondale	+ 1' 38"
9	Tanel Kangert (EST)	Astana	+ 2' 35"
10	Chris Anker Sørensen (DEN)	Saxo–Tinkoff	+ 2' 50"

== Classification leadership table ==
In the 2013 Tour de Pologne, four different jerseys were awarded. For the general classification, calculated by adding each cyclist's finishing times on each stage, and the leader received a yellow jersey. This classification was considered the most important of the 2013 Tour de Pologne, and the winner of the classification is the winner of the race. Time bonuses for the general classification were accrued via two methods; at stage finishes, for the first three riders, time bonuses were applied on a scale of ten seconds to the winner, six for second and four for third. The other way came via the newly introduced "attractivity" classification, which ranked riders daily as to their performances at each categorised climb or intermediate sprint during the equivalent day's stage, which offered points to the riders on a 3–2–1 scale. The rider with the most points in the classification at the end of the stage received a 30-second time bonus, with second place receiving 20 seconds, and third place receiving a bonus of 10 seconds. Any placings resulting in a tie would see each rider receiving the time bonus for the highest position.

There was also a mountains classification, the leadership of which was marked by a fuchsia jersey, representing the Tauron Group, the sponsors of the classification. In the mountains classification, points were won by reaching the top of a climb before other cyclists, with more points available for the higher-categorised climbs, which were split into three distinctive categories. Double points were awarded for the final climb of the race, on the penultimate stage. The third jersey represented the points classification, marked by a white-and-red jersey. In the points classification, cyclists got points for finishing in the top 20 in a stage. For all stages, the win earned 20 points, second place earned 19 points, third 18, and one point fewer per place down to a single point for 20th. The fourth jersey represented the sprints classification, marked by a red jersey. In the sprints classification, cyclists received points for finishing in the top 3 at intermediate sprint points during each stage, with the exception of the individual time trial stages. There was also a classification for teams, in which the times of the best three cyclists per team on each stage were added together; the leading team at the end of the race was the team with the lowest total time.

Stage	Winner	General Classification	Mountains Classification	Points Classification	Intermediate Sprints Classification	Team Classification
1	Diego Ulissi	Diego Ulissi	Bartosz Huzarski	Diego Ulissi	Bartosz Huzarski	RadioShack–Leopard
2	Christophe Riblon	Rafał Majka	Thomas Rohregger	Rafał Majka	Bartosz Huzarski	RadioShack–Leopard
3	Thor Hushovd	Rafał Majka	Thomas Rohregger	Rafał Majka	Bartosz Huzarski	RadioShack–Leopard
4	Taylor Phinney	Rafał Majka	Thomas Rohregger	Steele Von Hoff	Bartosz Huzarski	RadioShack–Leopard
5	Thor Hushovd	Jon Izagirre	Tomasz Marczyński	Thor Hushovd	Bartosz Huzarski	RadioShack–Leopard
6	Darwin Atapuma	Christophe Riblon	Tomasz Marczyński	Christophe Riblon	Bartosz Huzarski	RadioShack–Leopard
7	Bradley Wiggins	Pieter Weening	Tomasz Marczyński	Rafał Majka	Bartosz Huzarski	RadioShack–Leopard
Final		Pieter Weening	Tomasz Marczyński	Rafał Majka	Bartosz Huzarski	RadioShack–Leopard

Notes

- In stage 2, Darwin Atapuma, who was second in the points classification, wore the white jersey, because Diego Ulissi (in first place) wore the yellow jersey as leader of the general classification during that stage.
- In stage 2, Serge Pauwels, who was second in the intermediate sprints classification, wore the red jersey, because Bartosz Huzarski (in first place) wore the fuchisia jersey as leader of the mountains classification during that stage.
- In stage 3, Eros Capecchi, who was second in the points classification, wore the white jersey, because Rafał Majka (in first place) wore the yellow jersey as leader of the general classification during that stage. Also, in stage 4, Jon Izagirre wore the white jersey for the same reason.
- In stage 7, Rafał Majka, who was second in the points classification, wore the white jersey, because Christophe Riblon (in first place) wore the yellow jersey as leader of the general classification during that stage.
