= Harkema =

Harkema De Harkema (West Frisian) Opeinde
- Village
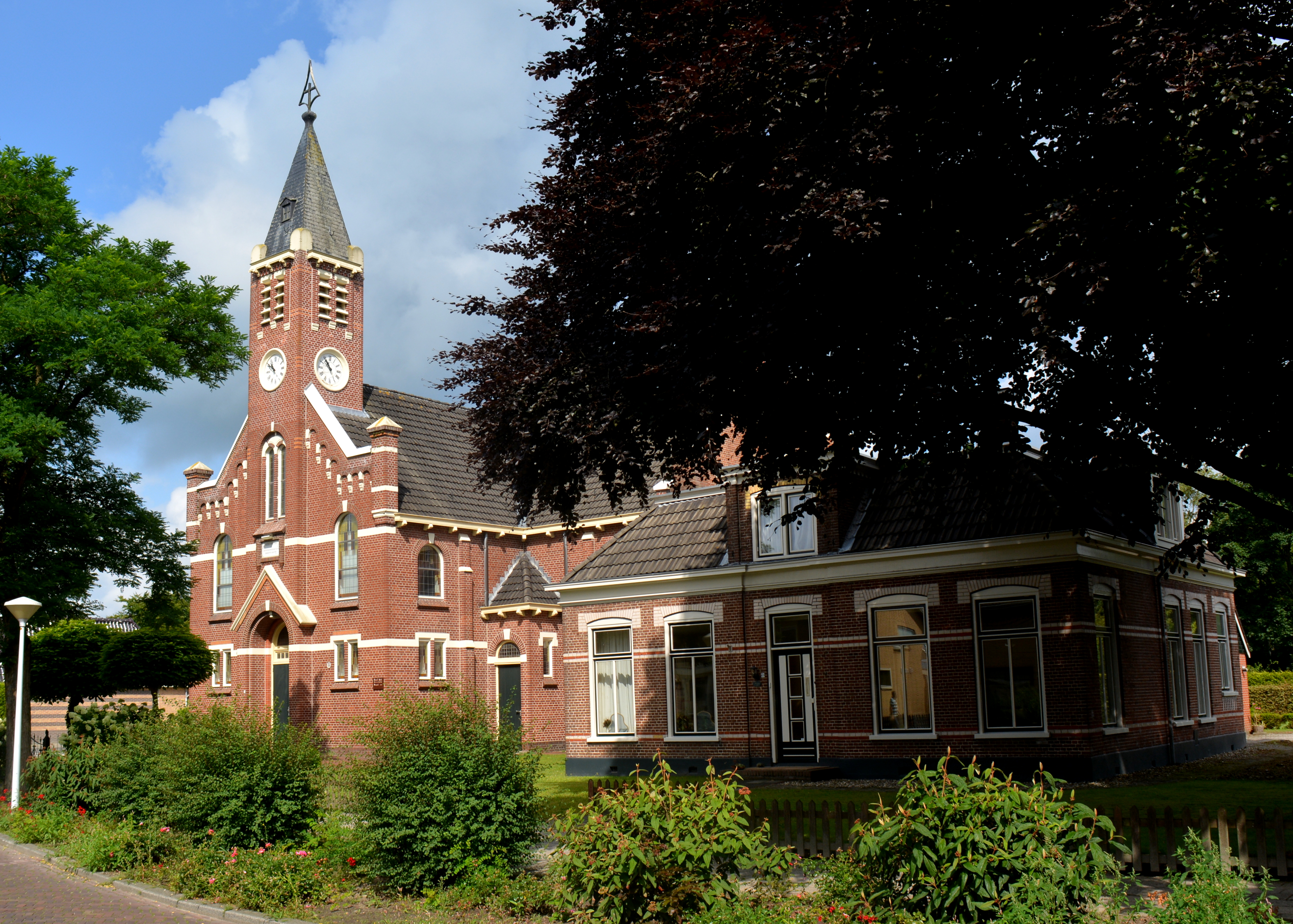
- Reformed church

- Flag Coat of arms

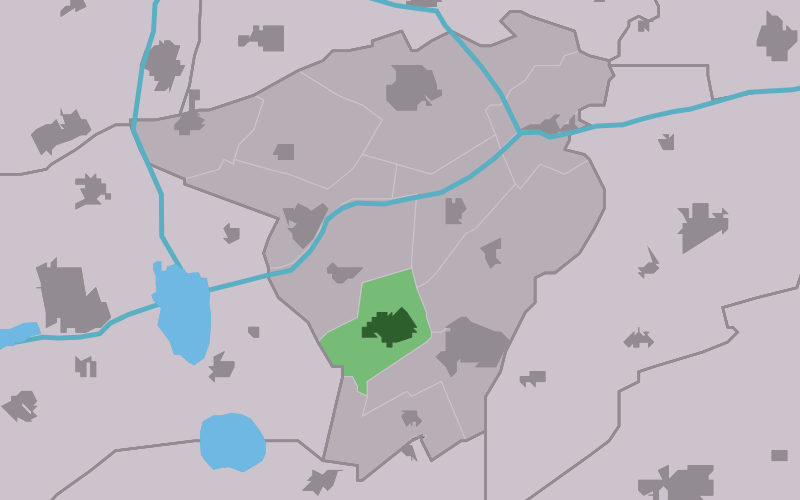
- Location in Achtkarspelen municipality

- Location in the Netherlands Harkema (Netherlands)
- Coordinates: 53°11′N 6°8′E
- Country: Netherlands
- Province: Friesland
- Municipality: Achtkarspelen

Area
  - Total: 6.53 km^{2} (2.52 sq mi)
- Elevation: 2 m (6.6 ft)

Population (2021)
  - Total: 4,295
  - Density: 658/km^{2} (1,700/sq mi)
- Time zone: UTC+1 (CET)
  - Summer (DST): UTC+2 (CEST)
- Postal code: 9281
- Dialing code: 0512

Harkema (West Frisian: De Harkema) is a village in the municipality of Achtkarspelen, province of Friesland, the Netherlands.

Harkema is in the eastern part of Friesland, 9 km (6 mi) north of Drachten. It was once known as Harkema-Opeinde. As of January 2017, the village had a population of 4,295.

== History ==
The village was first mentioned in 1530 as Opeyndt. The name Harkema means 'settlement of the descendants of Buwe Harkema'. In 1972, the name was officially changed from Harkema-Opeinde to Harkema.

Harkema was originally a peat-excavation settlement. The initial linear settlement which mainly consisted of sod houses disappeared in the 18th century, but re-emerged during the 19th century. In 1840, it was home to 484 people. In 1883, a church was opened in a wooden shed, and was replaced in 1891 by a real church. The church was too small and was replaced by the current church in 1913. In the 1960s, Harkema experienced growth and started to attract industry.

== Sports ==
Harkema is home to the amateur football club Harkemase Boys. Cyclist Pieter Weening, who was the first Frisian to win a stage in the Tour de France, is from Harkema—along with another former cyclist pro, Wiebren Veenstra.

== Gallery ==
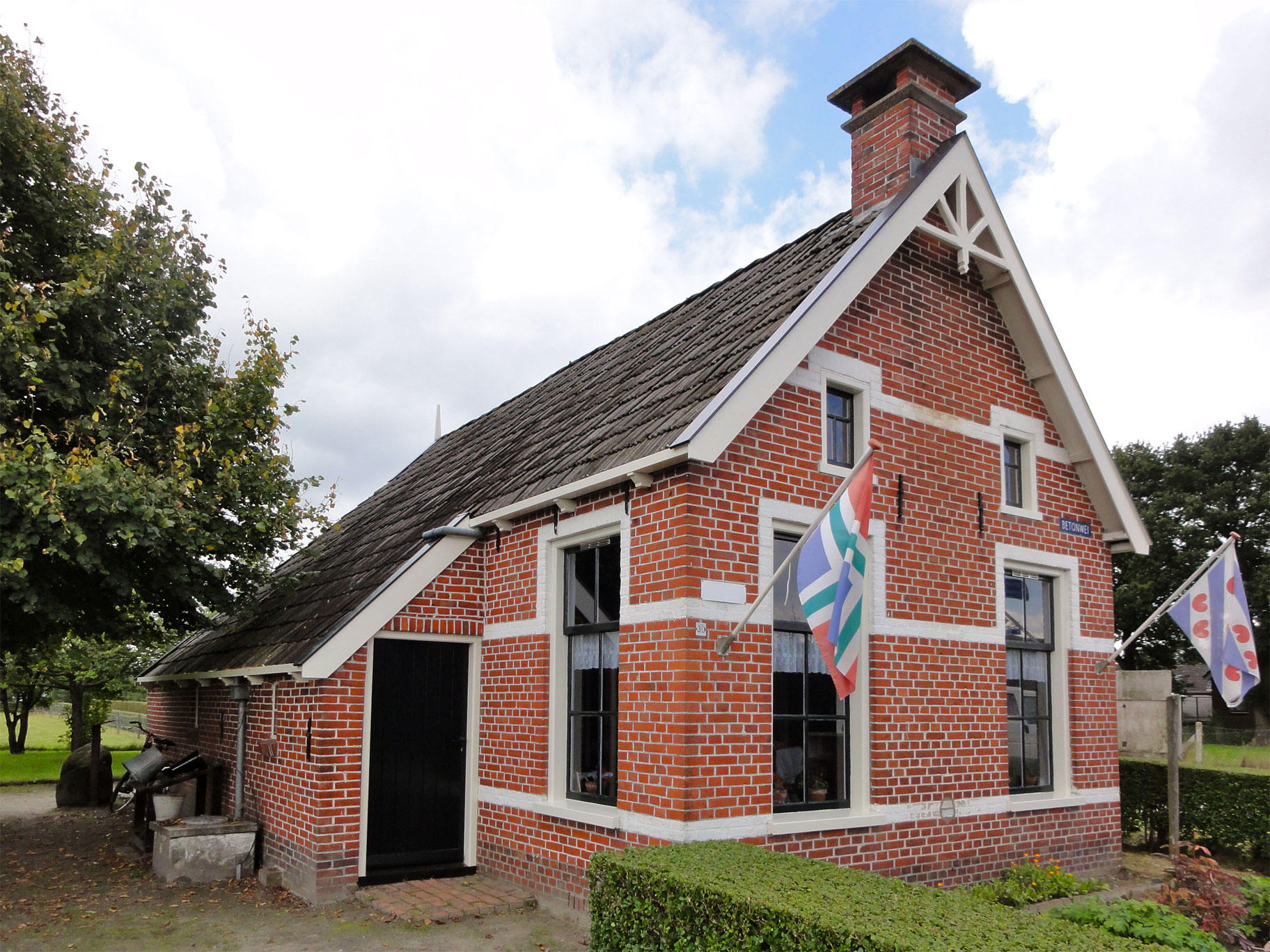
House in Harkema

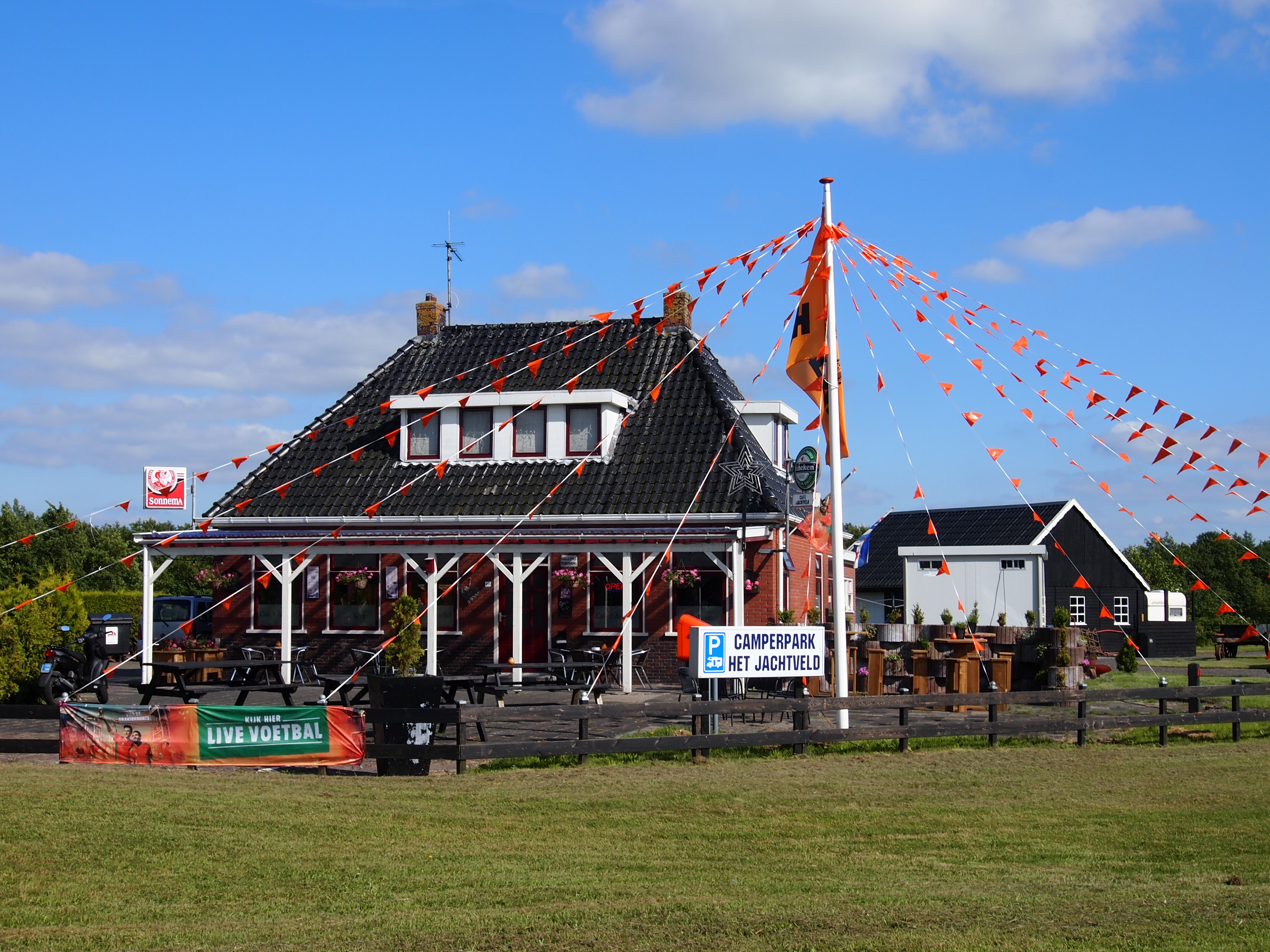
Camping during football season

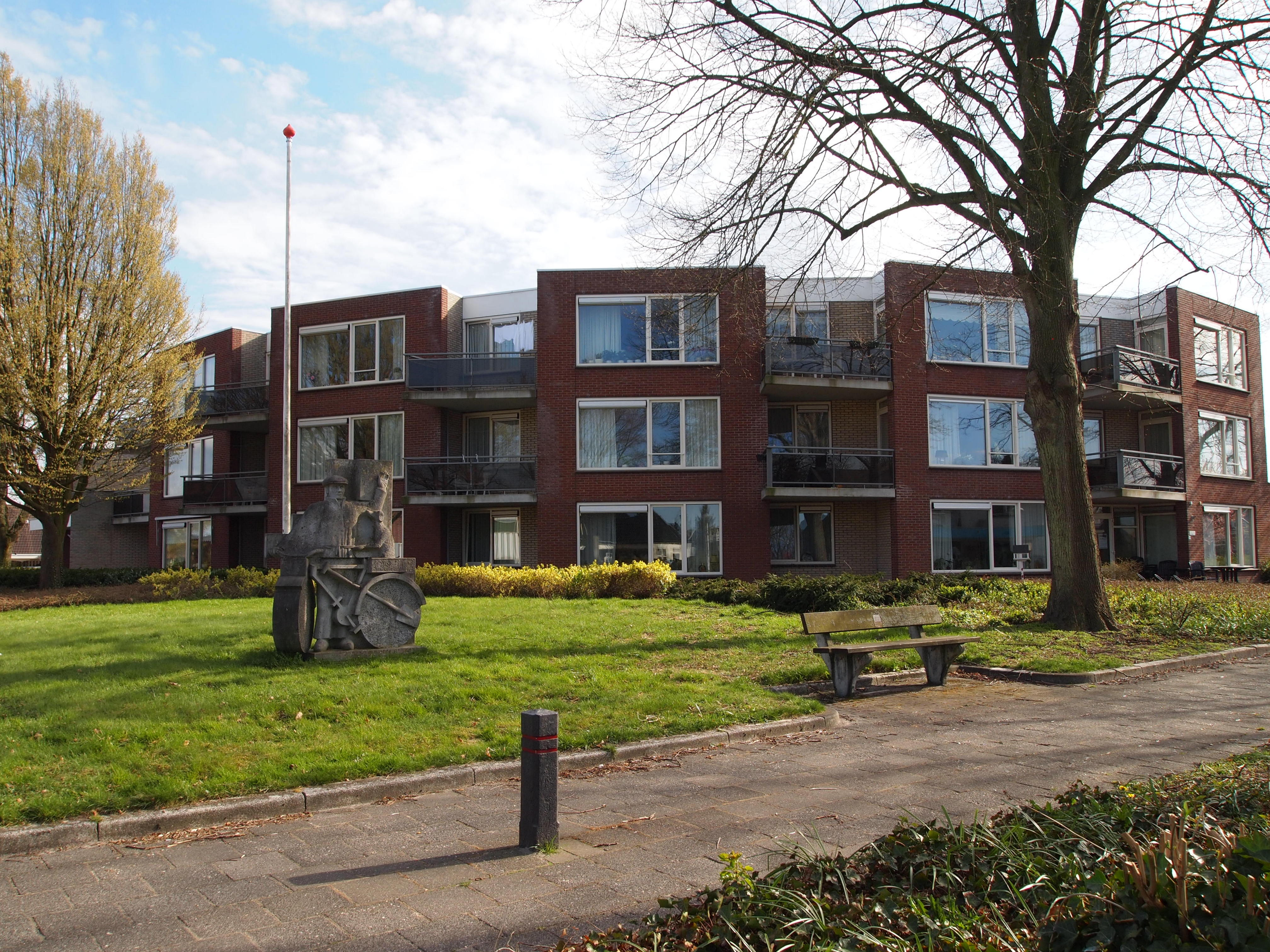
Apartment house

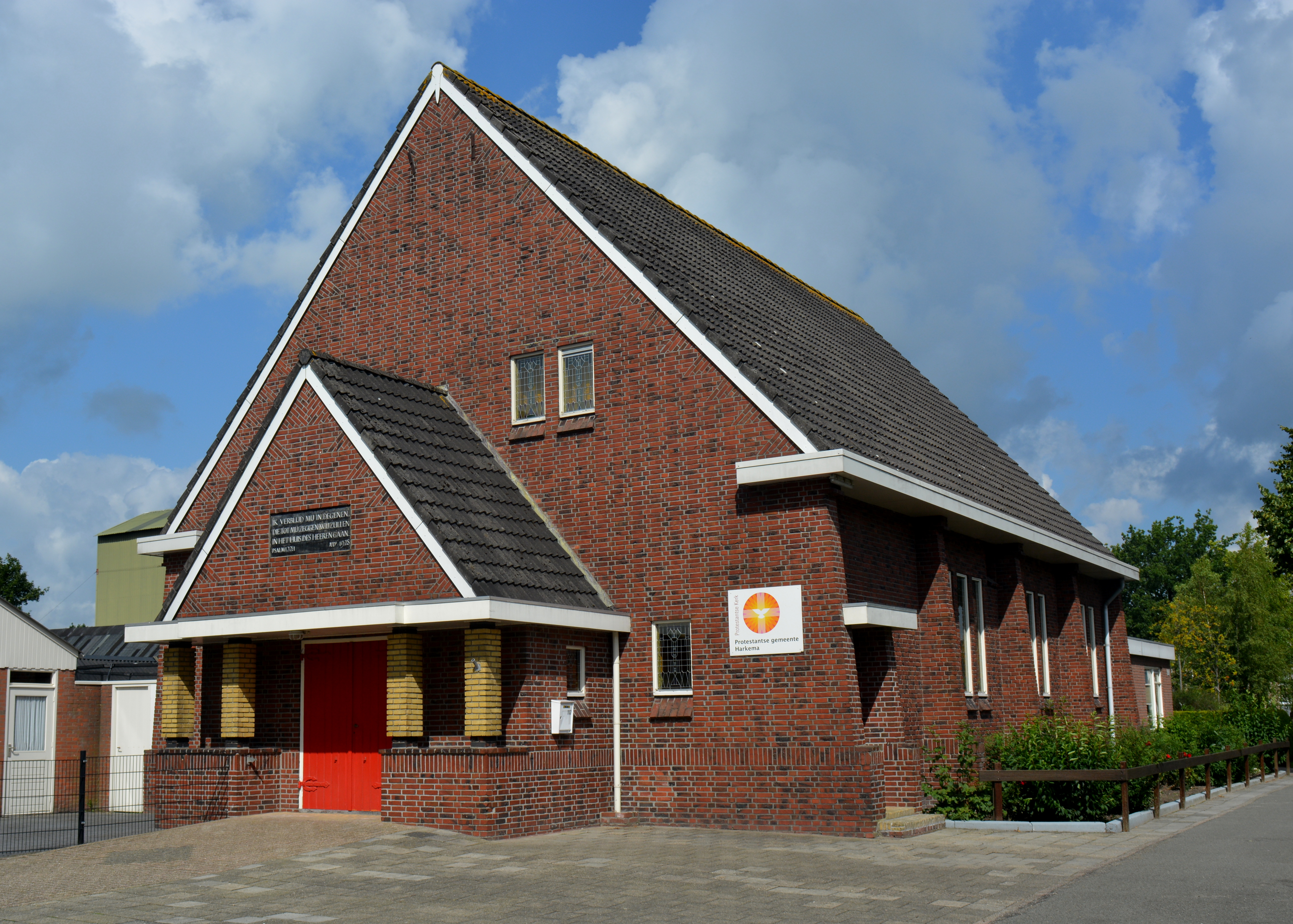
Protestant church
