= 2010 Vuelta a Murcia =

Race details
- Dates: 3–7 March 2010
- Stages: 5
- Distance: 630.4 km (391.7 mi)
- Winning time: 16h 01' 24"

Results
	Winner	František Raboň (CZE)
	Second	Denis Menchov (RUS)
	Third	Bradley Wiggins (GBR)

The 2010 Vuelta a Murcia was the 26th edition of the Vuelta a Murcia cycle race and was held on 3 March to 7 March 2010. The race started in San Pedro del Pinatar and finished in Murcia. The race was won by František Raboň.

== General classification ==
Final general classification

Rank	Rider	Time
1	František Raboň (CZE)	16h 01' 24"
2	Denis Menchov (RUS)	+ 38"
3	Bradley Wiggins (GBR)	+ 53"
4	Andreas Klöden (GER)	+ 57"
5	Josep Jufré (ESP)	+ 1' 21"
6	Stef Clement (NED)	+ 1' 23"
~~7~~	~~Lance Armstrong (USA)~~	~~+ 1' 23"~~
8	Pieter Weening (NED)	+ 1' 41"
9	Luke Roberts (AUS)	+ 1' 42"
10	Tomasz Marczyński (POL)	+ 1' 59"
