= 2009 Vuelta a Murcia =

Race details
- Dates: 4–8 March 2009
- Stages: 5
- Distance: 606.9 km (377.1 mi)
- Winning time: 14h 55' 06"

Results
| | Winner | Denis Menchov (RUS) |
| | Second | Rubén Plaza (ESP) |
| | Third | Pieter Weening (NED) |

The 2009 Vuelta a Murcia was the 25th edition of the Vuelta a Murcia cycle race and was held on 4 March to 8 March 2009. The race started in San Pedro del Pinatar and finished in Murcia. The race was won by Denis Menchov.

== General classification ==
Final general classification

| Rank | Rider | Time |
|---|---|---|
| 1 | Denis Menchov (RUS) | 14h 55' 06" |
| 2 | Rubén Plaza (ESP) | + 20" |
| 3 | Pieter Weening (NED) | + 35" |
| 4 | Xavier Tondo (ESP) | + 45" |
| 5 | Jaume Rovira Pons (ESP) | + 51" |
| 6 | Ezequiel Mosquera (ESP) | + 1' 15" |
| 7 | Carlos Nozal Vega (ESP) | + 1' 58" |
| 8 | Laurens ten Dam (NED) | + 1' 59" |
| 9 | Francisco Pérez Sanchez (ESP) | + 2' 06" |
| 10 | Matthew Goss (AUS) | + 2' 07" |
