= Pieter Weening =

Dutch road bicycle racer

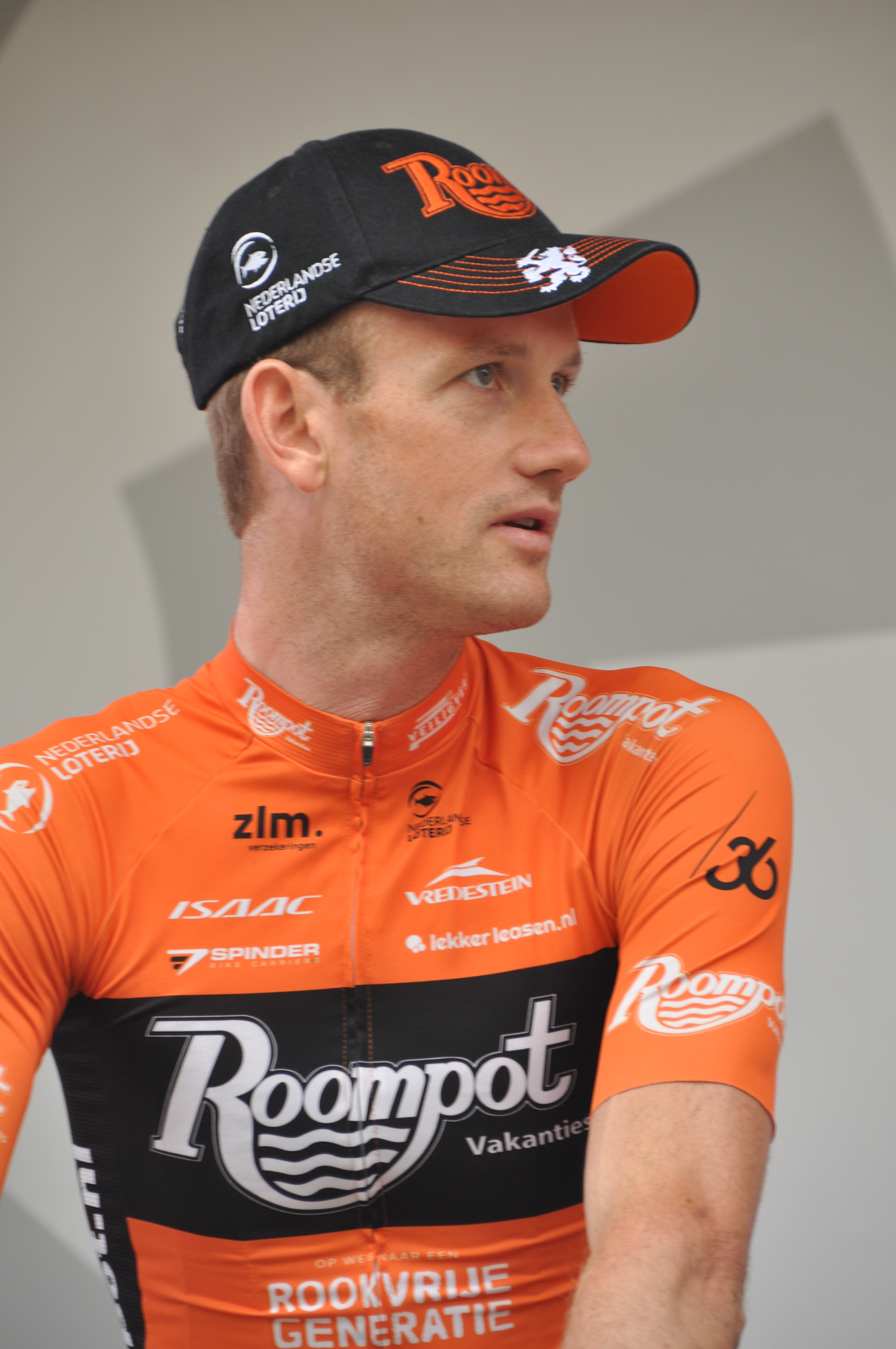
- Weening at the 2018 Deutschland Tour

Personal information
- Full name: Pieter Weening
- Born: 5 April 1981 (age 45) Harkema, the Netherlands
- Height: 1.86 m (6 ft 1 in)
- Weight: 68 kg (150 lb; 10.7 st)

Cycling career
- Sport: Cycling
- Current team: Team Jayco–AlUla
- Discipline: Road
- Role: Rider (retired); Directeur sportif
- Rider type: Climber

Amateur teams
- 2000–2003: Rabobank Beloften
- 2003: Rabobank (stagiaire)

Professional teams
- 2004–2011: Rabobank
- 2012–2015: GreenEDGE
- 2016–2019: Roompot–Oranje Peloton
- 2020: Trek–Segafredo

Managerial team
- 2022–: Team BikeExchange–Jayco

Major wins
- Grand Tours Tour de France 1 individual stage (2005) Giro d'Italia 2 individual stages (2011, 2014) 2 TTT stages (2014, 2015) Stage races Tour de Pologne (2013) Tour of Norway (2016)

Pieter Weening (born 5 April 1981) is a Dutch former professional road bicycle racer, who rode professionally between 2004 and 2020 – for teams Rabobank (2004–2011), Orica–GreenEDGE (2012–2015), Roompot–Charles (2016–2019), and Trek–Segafredo (2020). During his career, Weening took a total of thirteen victories, including Grand Tour stage victories at the 2005 Tour de France, the 2011 Giro d'Italia and the 2014 Giro d'Italia. He also won the 2013 Tour de Pologne and 2016 Tour of Norway stage races.

Following his retirement from competing, Weening has worked as a directeur sportif for UCI WorldTeam Team Jayco–AlUla since the start of the 2022 season.

== Career ==
=== Amateur career ===
Born in Harkema, Friesland, Weening joined the Rabobank Beloften team in 2000. In 2002, he won the under-23 race at the Dutch National Road Race Championships, while also placing inside the top ten overall at the Tour de l'Avenir. In his final year at under-23 level in 2003, Weening won the Jadranska Magistrala stage race in Croatia, winning a stage and the mountains classification as well. He recorded third-place finishes at La Côte Picarde, Liège–Bastogne–Liège U23 and the Thüringen Rundfahrt der U23 (also winning a stage), second overall at the Triptyque Ardennais, and he formed part of the winning breakaway group in the under-23 road race at the UCI Road World Championships in Canada – ultimately finishing eighth in the group.

=== Rabobank (2004–2011) ===
Weening turned professional with Rabobank in 2004, making his Grand Tour début at the Vuelta a España, where he finished 59th overall. He took his first professional victory when he won the eighth stage of the 2005 Tour de France; having bridged across to the breakaway around halfway through the stage, Weening dropped his rivals on the final climb, but was caught by Andreas Klöden before the summit. The pair were able to remain clear of the peloton on the descent to the finish in Gérardmer, with Weening narrowly winning the sprint by 1 centimetre (0.39 inches). Later in the year, Weening finished second overall at the Tour de Pologne, five seconds behind race winner Kim Kirchen; he also won the sixth stage to take the race lead, before ceding the lead to Kirchen on the final day. For his performances, Weening won the Gerrit Schulte Trofee as the Dutch men's cyclist of the year.

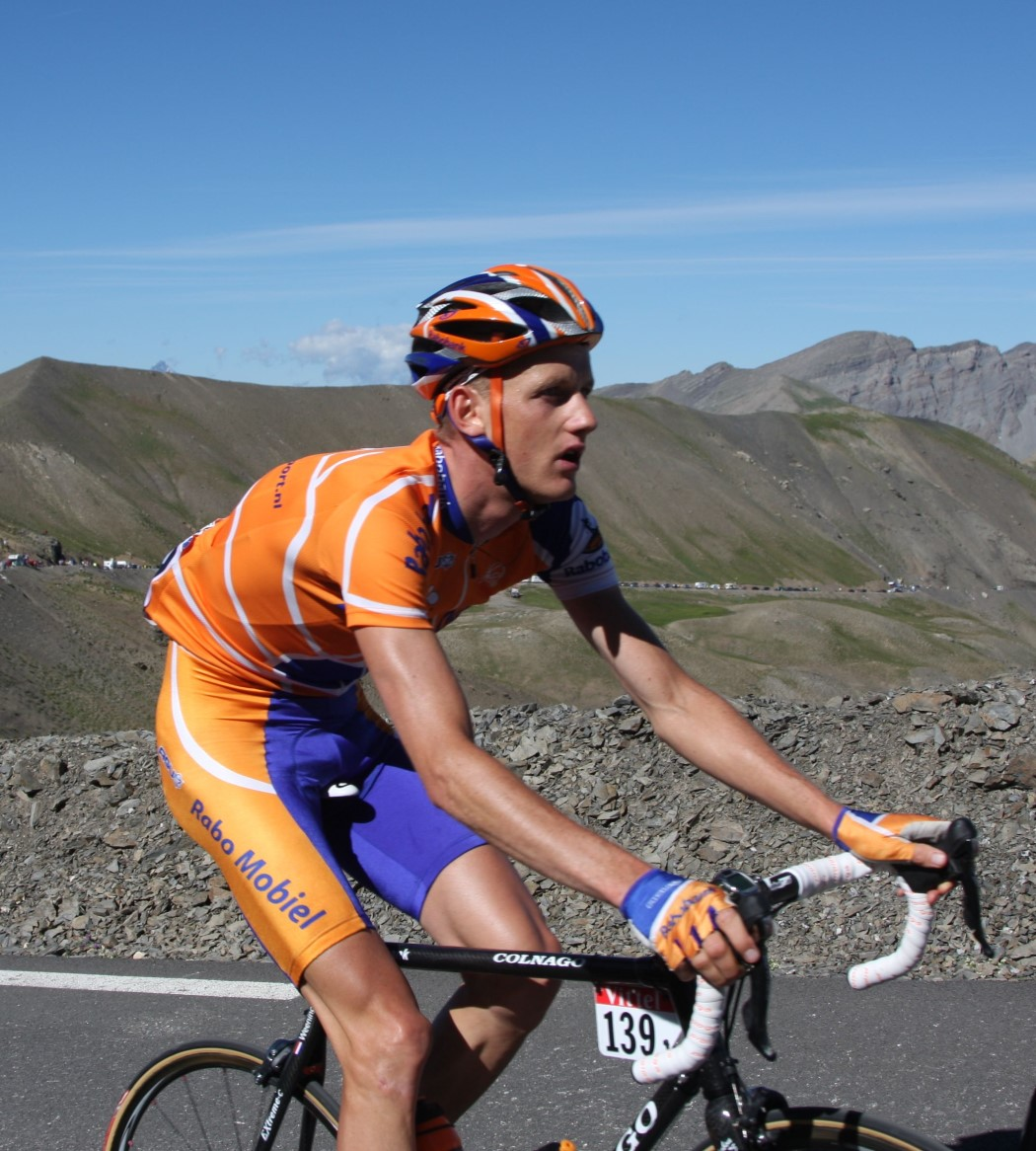
Weening at the 2008 Tour de France

Over the next three years, Weening largely worked as a climbing domestique but recorded top-ten overall finishes at the 2006 Critérium International (eighth), and the 2008 Regio-Tour (seventh), while also extending his contract with the team until the end of 2009. He returned to the podium with a third-place overall finish at the 2009 Vuelta a Murcia, a race won by teammate Denis Menchov. Having extended his contract for a further year, Weening took his first victory since 2005, when he won the third stage of the Tour of Austria that July – ultimately finishing the race in sixth place overall. He also recorded a fourth-place finish at August's Tour de Pologne, missing the podium by one second to Edvald Boasson Hagen.

In 2010, Weening recorded a top-ten overall finish at March's Vuelta a Murcia (eighth), before recording his best finish at a Grand Tour on his début at the Giro d'Italia, finishing twenty-fourth overall in the general classification, one hour and ten minutes behind race winner Ivan Basso. He then finished fifth overall at the Ster Elektrotoer, second to Niki Terpstra in the Dutch National Road Race Championships, before suffering a collarbone break at the Vuelta a Burgos, ultimately ending his season. Having extended his contract into 2011, Weening recorded a sixth-place overall finish at that year's Tour de Romandie, his final warm-up race for the Giro d'Italia. At the Giro d'Italia, Weening won stage five, which included an uphill finish and several unpaved roads or strade bianche. He soloed away from the breakaway group with 9 kilometres (5.6 miles) remaining, ultimately finishing 8 seconds clear of the peloton, to take the race leader's pink jersey – a jersey he would present as a tribute to the family of Wouter Weylandt, who had died during stage 3 of the race. The first Dutch rider to hold the race lead since Jeroen Blijlevens in 1999, Weening held onto the jersey for a further three days, ceding the lead to Alberto Contador after stage nine, which finished at Mount Etna.

=== GreenEDGE (2012–2015) ===
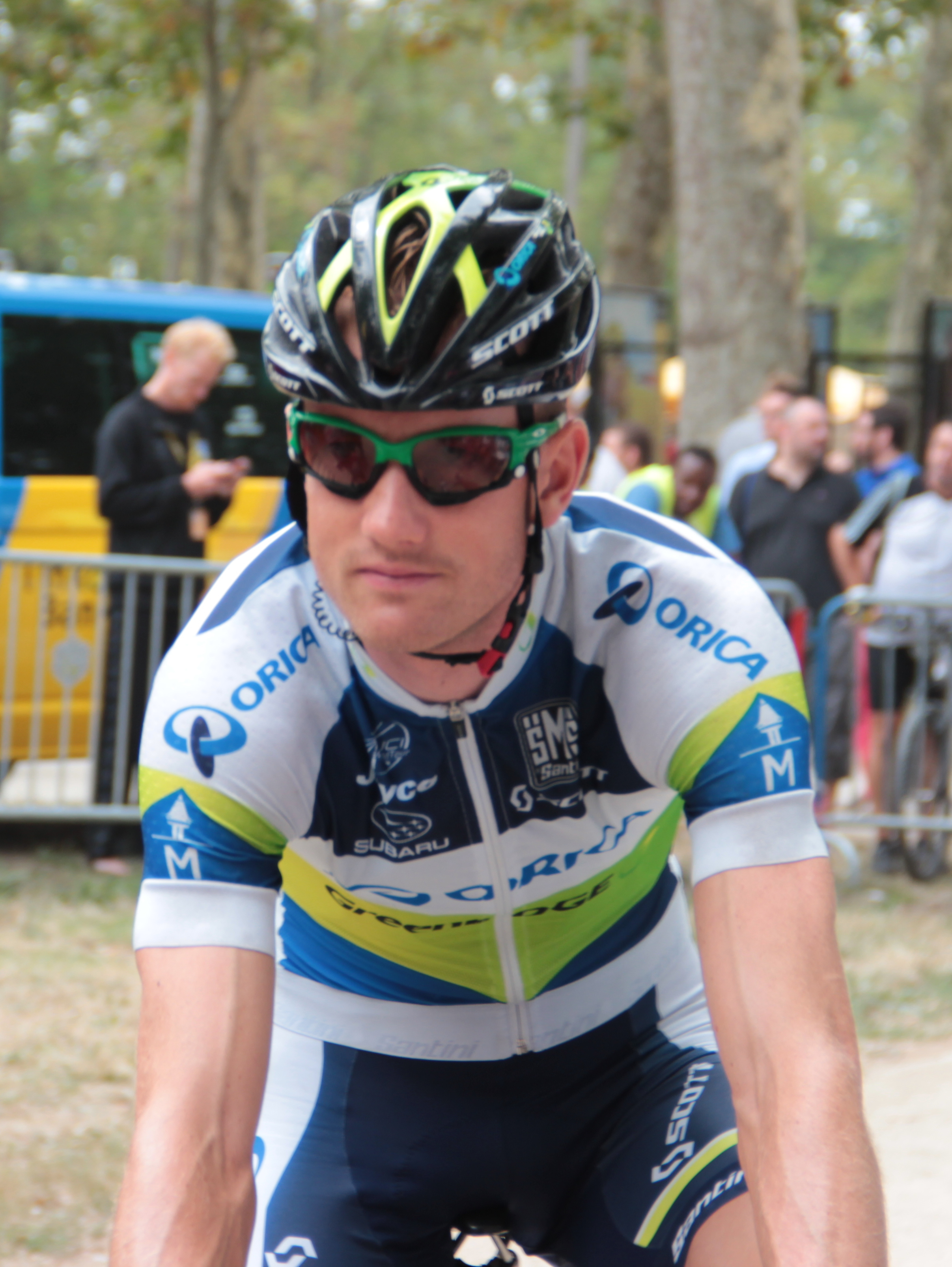
Weening at the 2012 Tour de France

After eight seasons with Rabobank, Weening left the team to join the new GreenEDGE squad for its inaugural season in 2012. Due to a knee injury, Weening's first start with the team did not come until April's Circuit de la Sarthe. His best finish of the season came the following month, when he finished tenth overall at the Tour of California. The following year, Weening finished second overall to Julián Arredondo at the Tour de Langkawi, having also finished second to Arredondo on the fifth stage to Genting Highlands. He then followed this up with top-ten results at the Tour of the Basque Country (sixth), and the Amstel Gold Race (eighth). Later in the season, Weening won the Tour de Pologne, moving up from fifth overall on the final stage, a 37-kilometre (23-mile) individual time trial that finished in Kraków. He also finished second to Sep Vanmarcke in the Grand Prix Impanis-Van Petegem, prior to riding for the Dutch team in the road race at the UCI Road World Championships, which were held in Italy.

In 2014, Weening formed part of the Orica–GreenEDGE squad that won the opening team time trial stage of the Giro d'Italia. On stage nine, Weening took part in the day's main breakaway and, along with Davide Malacarne, was able to stay away to the end of the stage. He outsprinted Malacarne in the closing metres in Sestola, to take his third Grand Tour stage victory. Weening also won the Giro della Toscana from a solo attack. Weening also featured as part of a second consecutive team time trial stage victory for Orica–GreenEDGE at the 2015 Giro d'Italia.

=== Roompot–Oranje Peloton (2016–2019) ===
Following four seasons with Orica–GreenEDGE, and having turned down a two-year contract extension, Weening moved to UCI Professional Continental team Roompot–Oranje Peloton for the 2016 season. He took his first victories with the team at that year's Tour of Norway; he soloed to victory on stage 2 in Rjukan after a 20-kilometre (12-mile) attack, maintaining the overall lead for the rest of the race. The following month, he won a stage of the Tour de Suisse, having soloed away from a breakaway group in poor weather conditions. Having won the mountains classification at the 2017 Tour de Yorkshire, Weening looked to repeat his victory at the Tour of Norway; he won the third stage in Lillehammer to take the race lead, but ultimately dropped behind Edvald Boasson Hagen and Simon Gerrans on the final day to finish third overall. Later in the season, he also won the mountains classification at the Tour of Austria, and finished seventh overall in the Danmark Rundt.

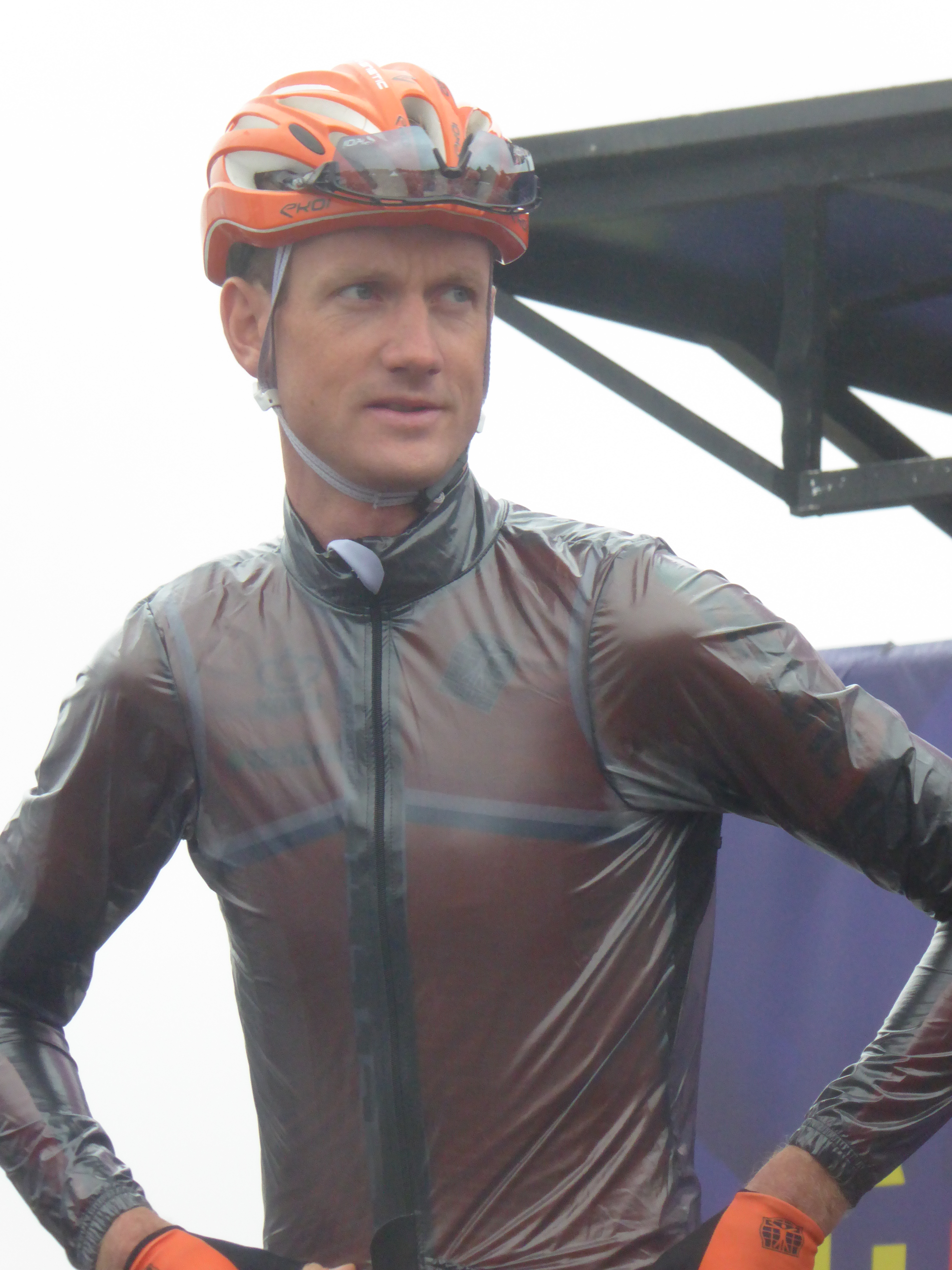
Weening at the 2018 European Road Cycling Championships

In 2018, Weening finished second overall to Kanstantsin Sivtsov in the Tour of Croatia, also finishing second behind Sivtsov on the race's queen stage – which finished at Sveti Jure in the Biokovo mountains. He placed sixth overall at the Adriatica Ionica Race in June, before he won the fifth stage of the Tour of Austria, which finished on the Grossglockner High Alpine Road. He also rode for the Netherlands in the road race at the UEC European Road Championships in Glasgow and the equivalent race at the UCI Road World Championships in Innsbruck. He then started the 2019 season with top-five placings at the Trofeo Andratx–Lloseta – held as part of the Vuelta a Mallorca one-day races – and the Classic Sud-Ardèche, before winning the second stage of the Tour de Luxembourg. He ultimately finished outside of the top ten in the general classification, losing nearly a minute on the final stage, but he did finish in the top ten overall at the Tour of Belgium.

=== Trek–Segafredo (2020) ===
After Roompot–Charles disbanded at the end of the 2019 season, Weening began the 2020 season as a free agent. In June, Weening signed a contract with Trek–Segafredo for the remainder of the 2020 season, marking his return to the UCI World Tour after four years at UCI Professional Continental level. He made his first start with the team at August's Strade Bianche, postponed from March due to the COVID-19 pandemic in Italy. He also rode the pandemic-delayed Giro d'Italia in October, but withdrew from the race on the fifth stage following a crash the previous day. His contract was not extended beyond the 2020 season, and Weening announced his retirement that November.

=== Post-retirement ===
In December 2021, Weening was announced as a directeur sportif for UCI WorldTeam Team BikeExchange–Jayco for the 2022 season, a role he continues to hold as of the 2025 season.

== Personal life ==
In 2022, Weening was convicted of assault and threatening behaviour and sentenced to 80 hours' community service; he appealed the decision, and in November 2023, the sentence was overturned in court in Leeuwarden, with the judge ruling that the incident "was threatening to him".

== Major results ==
2001
7th Overall Grand Prix Guillaume Tell
2002
1st Road race, National Under-23 Road Championships
2nd GP Wielerrevue
6th Overall Tour de l'Avenir
10th Overall Circuit des Ardennes
2003
1st Overall Jadranska Magistrala

1st Mountains classification
1st Stage 2

2nd Overall Triptyque Ardennais
3rd Overall Thüringen Rundfahrt der U23

1st Stage 1

3rd La Côte Picarde
3rd Liège–Bastogne–Liège U23
6th Flèche Ardennaise
8th Road race, UCI Under-23 Road World Championships
9th Overall Tour of Austria
10th Overall Niedersachsen Rundfahrt
2005
1st Stage 8 Tour de France
2nd Overall Tour de Pologne

1st Stage 6

9th Overall Vuelta a Murcia
2006
8th Overall Critérium International
2008
1st Ridderronde Maastricht
7th Overall Regio-Tour
2009
3rd Overall Vuelta a Murcia
4th Overall Tour de Pologne
6th Overall Tour of Austria

1st Stage 3

2010
2nd Road race, National Road Championships
5th Overall Ster Elektrotoer
8th Overall Vuelta a Murcia
10th Overall Tour of Austria
2011
Giro d'Italia

1st Stage 5
Held after Stages 5–8

6th Overall Tour de Romandie
2012
10th Overall Tour of California
2013
1st Overall Tour de Pologne
2nd Overall Tour de Langkawi
2nd Grand Prix Impanis-Van Petegem
6th Overall Tour of the Basque Country
8th Overall Eneco Tour
8th Amstel Gold Race
8th Amstel Curaçao Race
9th Trofeo Serra de Tramuntana
2014
1st Giro di Toscana
Giro d'Italia

1st Stages 1 (TTT) & 9

2015
1st Stage 1 (TTT) Giro d'Italia
2016
1st Overall Tour of Norway

1st Stage 2

1st Stage 6 Tour de Suisse
6th Overall Tour des Fjords
2017
1st Mountains classification, Tour de Yorkshire
1st Mountains classification, Tour of Austria
3rd Overall Tour of Norway

1st Stage 3

6th Trofeo Pollença–Port de Andratx
7th Overall Danmark Rundt
9th Vuelta a Murcia
2018
1st Stage 5 Tour of Austria
2nd Overall Tour of Croatia
6th Overall Adriatica Ionica Race
8th Overall Okolo Slovenska
2019
1st Stage 2 Tour de Luxembourg
4th Trofeo Andratx–Lloseta
5th Classic Sud-Ardèche
8th Trofeo Serra de Tramuntana
10th Overall Tour of Belgium

=== Grand Tour general classification results timeline ===
Grand Tour	2004	2005	2006	2007	2008	2009	2010	2011	2012	2013	2014	2015	2016	2017	2018	2019	2020
Giro d'Italia	—	—	—	—	—	—	24	45	—	38	DNF	92	—	—	—	—	DNF
Tour de France	—	72	93	128	63	—	—	—	72	—	—	144	—	—	—	—	—
/ Vuelta a España	59	—	61	—	—	44	—	—	88	—	—	—	—	—	—	—	—

Legend
—	Did not compete
DNF	Did not finish
