= Tomasz Marczyński =

Polish racing cyclist (born 1984)

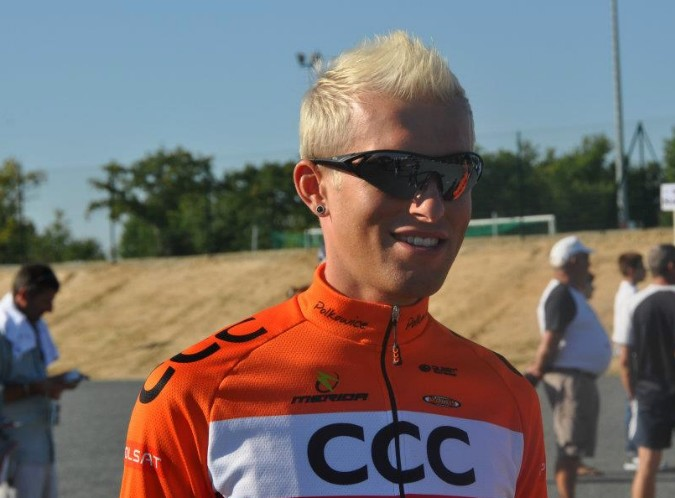
- Marczyński at the 2011 Tour de Vendée

Personal information
- Full name: Tomasz Marczyński
- Born: 6 March 1984 (age 42) Kraków, Poland
- Height: 1.80 m (5 ft 11 in)
- Weight: 65 kg (143 lb; 10 st 3 lb)

Cycling career
- Sport: Cycling
- Current team: Retired
- Discipline: Road
- Role: Rider
- Rider type: Puncheur

Amateur teams
- 1998–2002: Krakus Swoszowice
- 2003–2005: Pacyfik Toruń

Professional teams
- 2006–2008: Ceramica Flaminia–Bossini Docce
- 2009: Miche–Silver Cross–Selle Italia
- 2010–2011: CCC–Polsat–Polkowice
- 2012–2013: Vacansoleil–DCM
- 2014: CCC–Polsat–Polkowice
- 2015: Torku Şekerspor
- 2016–2021: Lotto–Soudal

Major wins
- Grand Tours Vuelta a España 2 individual stages (2017) One-day races and Classics National Road Race Championships (2007, 2011, 2015) National Time Trial Championships (2011)

Tomasz Marczyński (born 6 March 1984) is a Polish former road racing cyclist, who rode professionally between 2006 and 2021 for the Ceramica Flaminia–Bossini Docce (2006–08), Miche–Silver Cross–Selle Italia (2009), CCC–Polsat–Polkowice (2010–11 and 2014), Vacansoleil–DCM (2012–13), Torku Şekerspor (2015) and Lotto–Soudal (2016–21) teams.

== Biography ==
Marczyński was born in Kraków, Poland, and he started as a trainee for the Krakus Swoszowice team, staying with them from 1998–2002, and then riding for Pacyfik Toruń from 2003–2005. In 2006 he began a professional career with the Italian team Ceramica Flaminia–Bossini Docce. In 2007, he won the Polish national road race championship. In September 2015 it was reported that Marczyński would join Lotto–Soudal for the 2016 season, returning to the WorldTour ranks for the first time since 2013.

He was named in the start list for the 2017 Giro d'Italia.

In the 2017 Vuelta a Espana, Marczynski achieved his greatest successes to date in Grand Tours by winning two stages, the 6th and the 12th. In July 2018, he was named in the start list for the 2018 Tour de France. Marczyński retired from competition at the end of the 2021 season.

== Major results ==
2005
9th Trofeo Internazionale Bastianelli
2006
2nd Road race, National Road Championships
2007
1st Road race, National Road Championships
3rd Grand Prix of Aargau Canton
8th Overall Route du Sud
9th Overall Vuelta a Chihuahua
10th GP Triberg-Schwarzwald
2008
2nd Overall Clásica Internacional de Alcobendas
5th Overall Vuelta a Asturias

1st Stage 4

2009
9th Overall Brixia Tour
2010
1st Overall Tour de Seoul

1st Stage 1

2nd Coupe des Carpathes
3rd Overall Szlakiem Grodów Piastowskich

1st Stage 2

5th Overall Szlakiem Walk Majora Hubala
5th Overall Tour of Hainan
10th Overall Vuelta a Murcia
2011
National Road Championships

1st Road race
1st Time trial

1st Overall Tour of Małopolska
3rd Memoriał Henryka Łasaka
2012
1st Mountains classification Tour de Pologne
1st Sprints classification Volta a Catalunya
1st Mountains classification Vuelta a Murcia
3rd Rund um Köln
8th Overall Tour of Beijing
2013
1st Mountains classification Tour de Pologne
2014
8th Overall Szlakiem Grodów Piastowskich
2015
1st Road race, National Road Championships
1st Overall Tour du Maroc

1st Stages 1, 4 & 7

1st Overall Tour of Black Sea

1st Mountains classification
1st Stage 1

8th Overall Tour of Turkey
2017
Vuelta a España

1st Stages 6 & 12

2019
1st Mountains classification Tour of Guangxi
2020
6th Pollença–Andratx

=== Grand Tour general classification results timeline ===
Grand Tour	2012	2013	2014	2015	2016	2017	2018	2019	2020	2021
Giro d'Italia	DNF	—	—	—	—	47	—	—	—	DNF
Tour de France	—	—	—	—	—	—	103	—	—	—
Vuelta a España	13	DNF	—	—	—	55	—	74	108	—

Legend
—	Did not compete
DNF	Did not finish
