= Wilga, Burkina Faso =

Wilga Wiliga
- Location in Burkina Faso
- Coordinates: 11°48′N 1°19′W
- Country: Burkina Faso
- Region: Centre-Sud Region
- Province: Bazèga Province
- Department: Toece Department

Population (2019)
  - Total: 1,142

Wilga or Wiliga is a village in the Toece Department of Bazèga Province in central Burkina Faso.

Population
Year	Pop.	±%
1985	823	—
2006	826	+0.4%
2019	1,142	+38.3%
