= Vistulan Boulevards, Kraków =

Vistulan Boulevards in Kraków
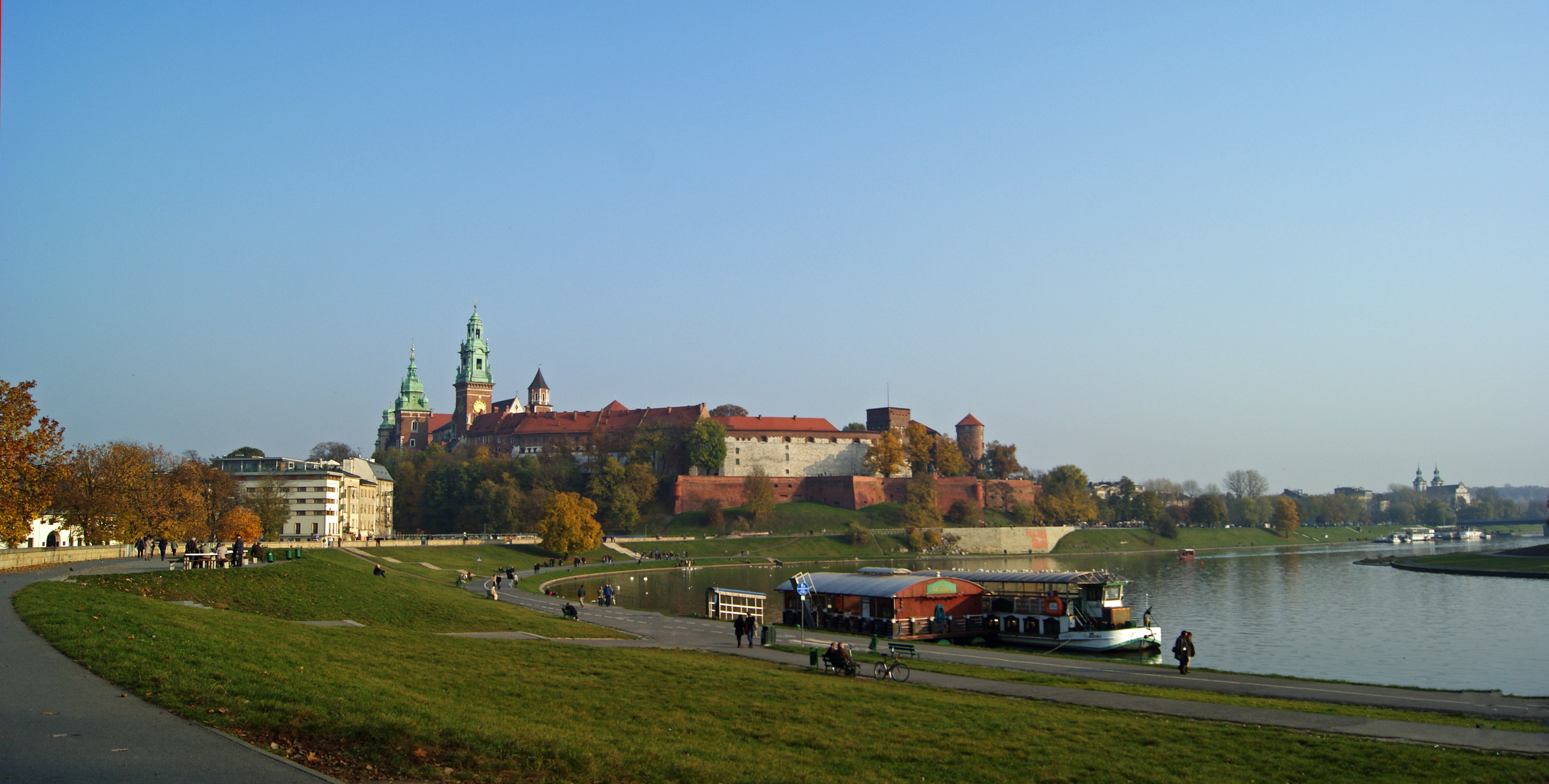
- Boulevards viewed from the Vistula River
- Interactive map of Vistulan Boulevards in Kraków
- Type: Boulevards
- Location: Kraków, Poland
- Coordinates: 50°01′51″N 19°33′36″E
- Created: 19th century
- Status: Open year round

The Vistulan Boulevards are historical hydraulic boulevards used for flood management in Kraków, Poland. The boulevards are structured from retaining walls (an upper, high and lower which is used to channel the river channel), allowing the boulevards to perform a river port function. The nineteenth- and twentieth-century boulevards are used for flood management, namely during the floods of 1970, 1997, and 2010.

The boulevards around the river channel of the Vistula and the Rudawa are part of an area of parkland, being a popular recreational area for Cracovians and tourists alike. The boulevards are pedestrianised, with bicycle routes.

== Gallery ==
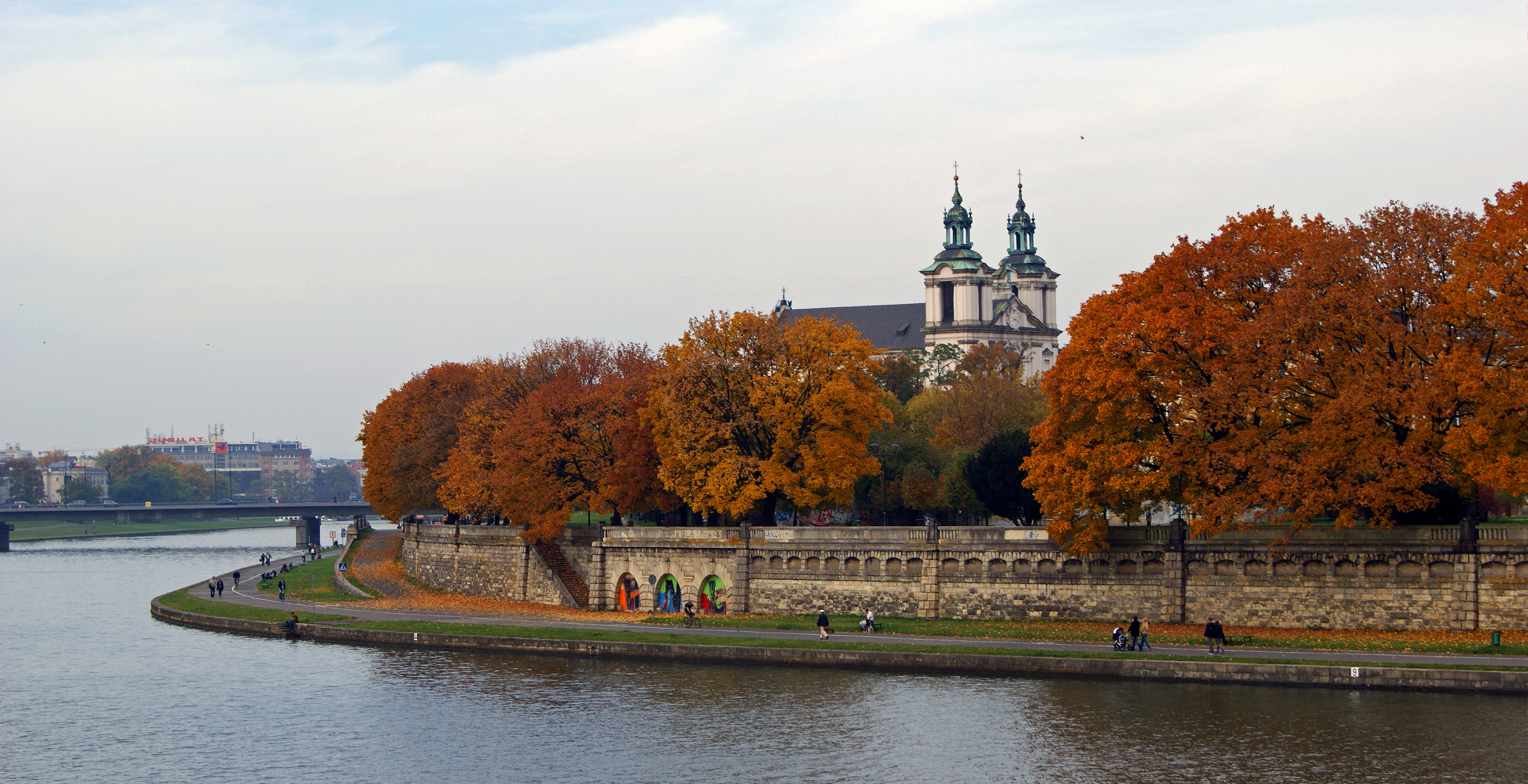
Inflanty Boulevard seen from Retmański Bridge

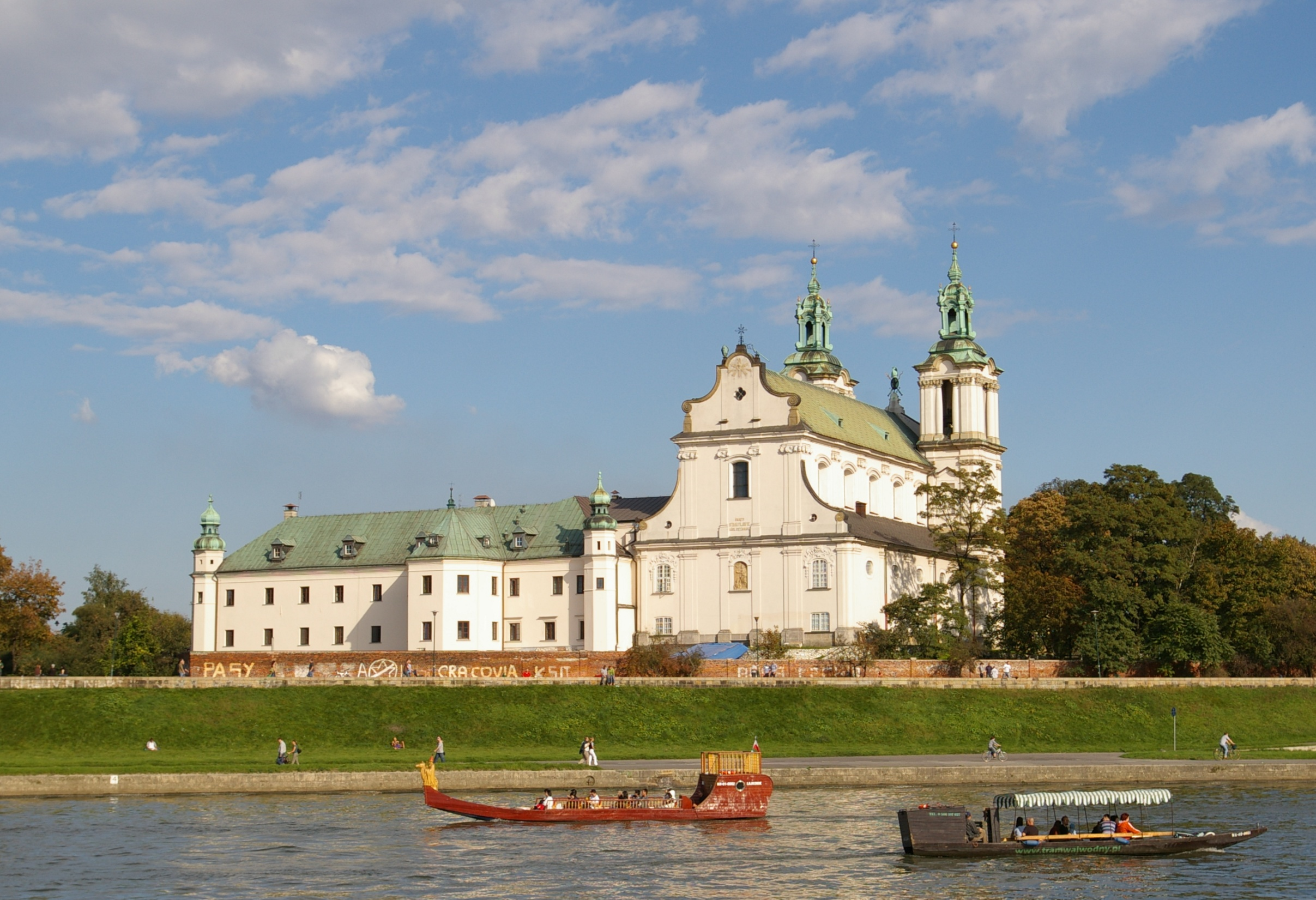
Church at Skałka and water taxis on the Vistula

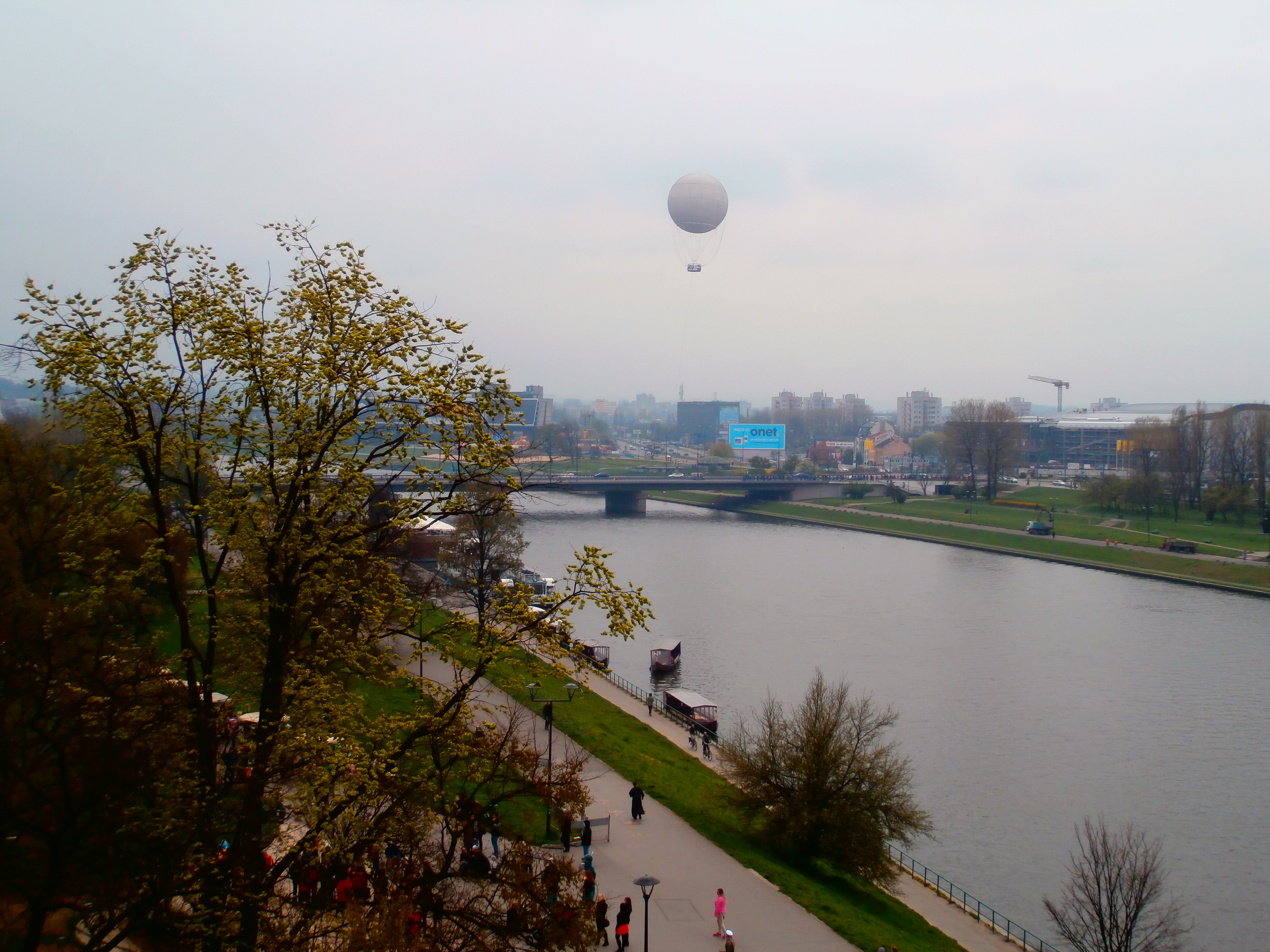
Czerwieński and Poleski Boulevard seen from the Grunwald Bridge

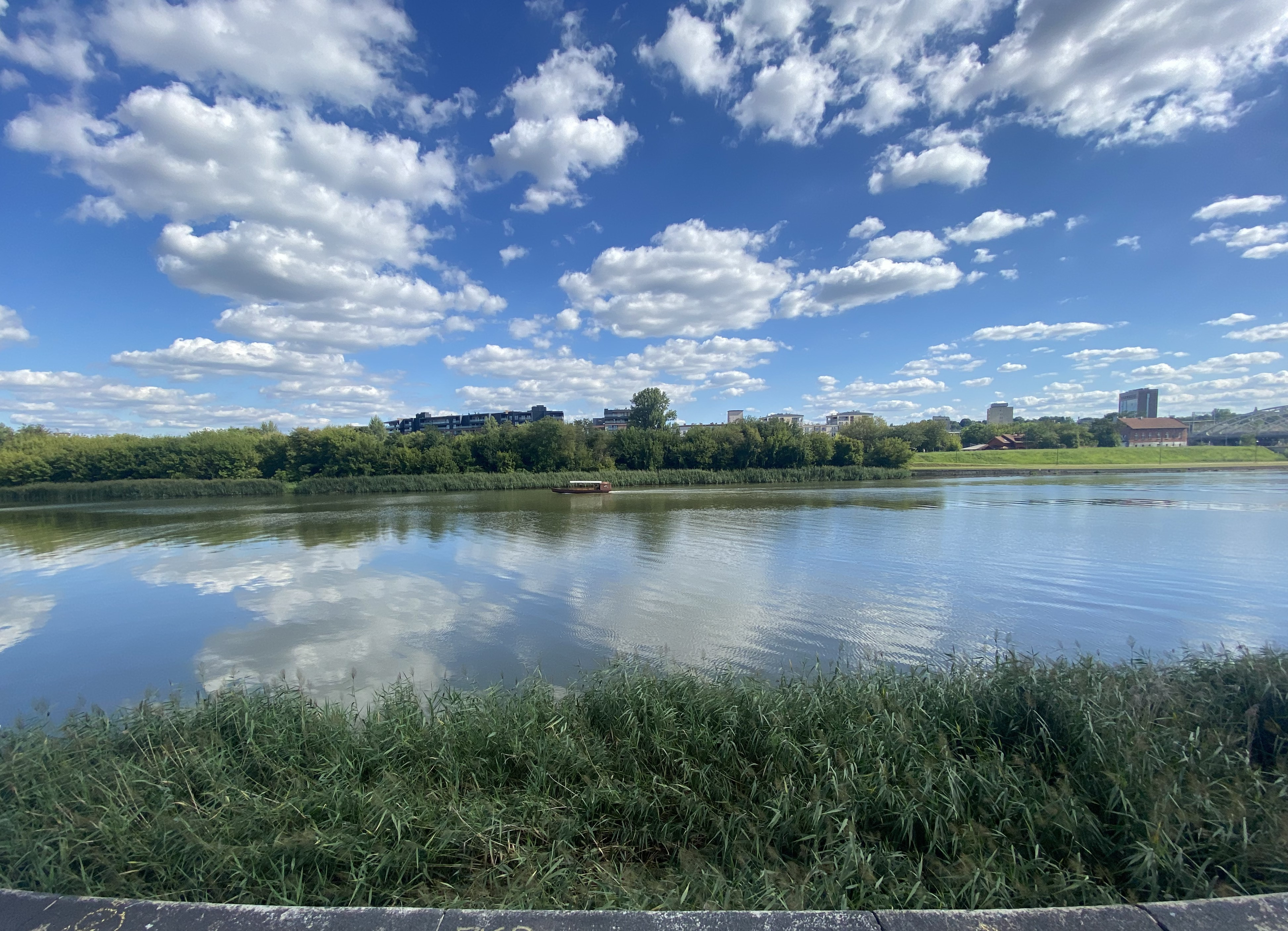
Vistulan Boulevards

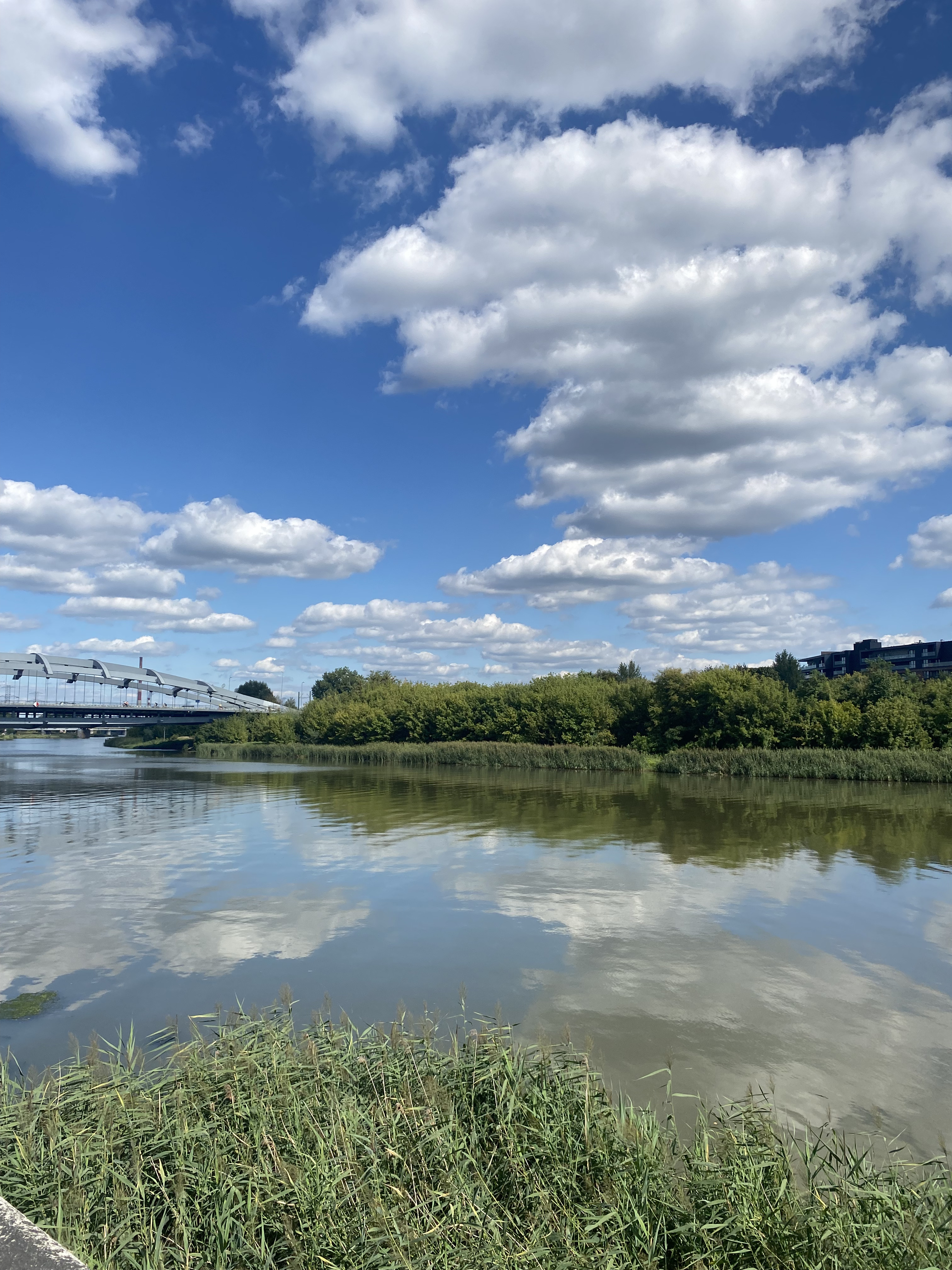
Vistulan Boulevards

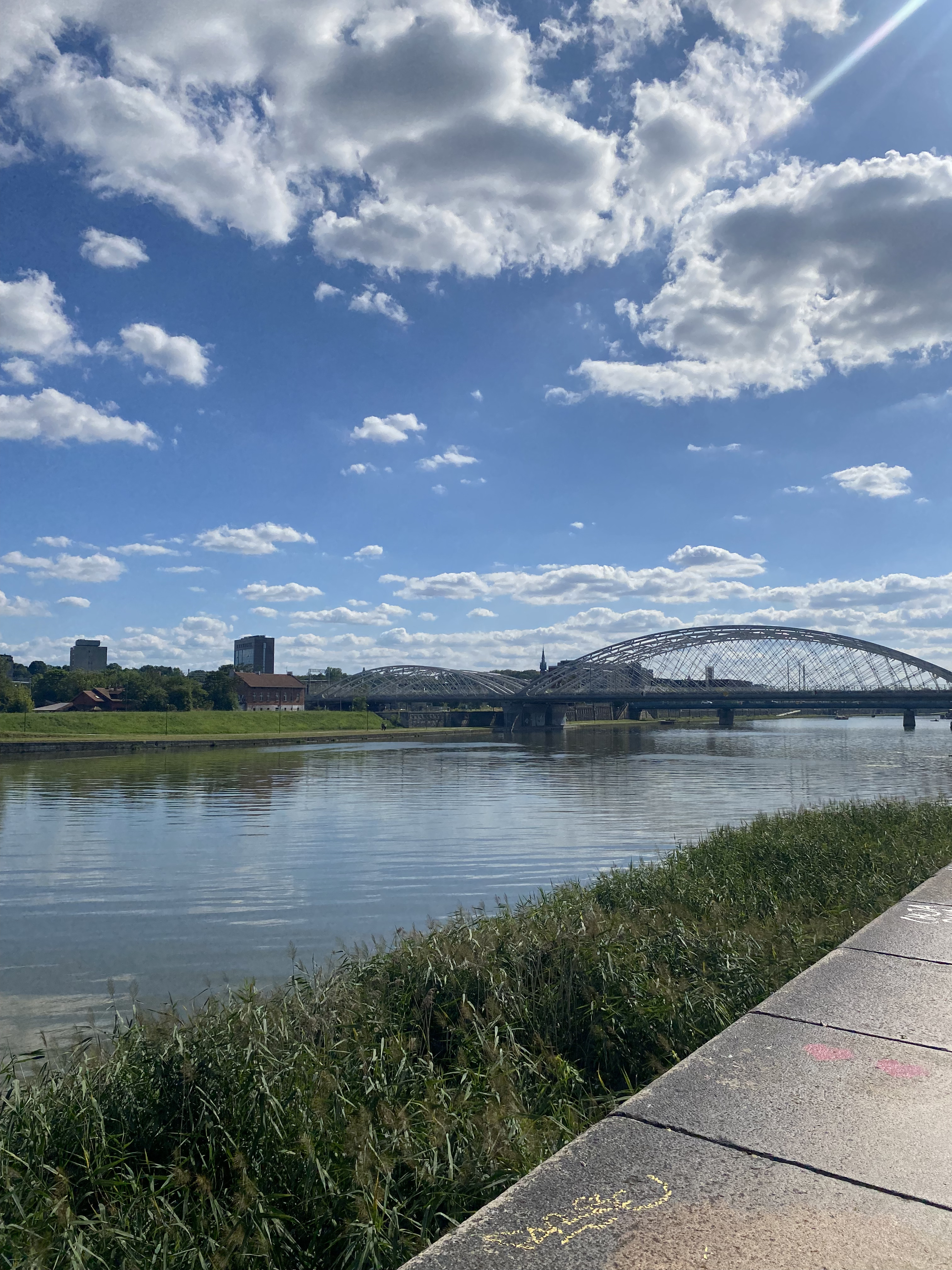
Zabłocie Railroad Bridge

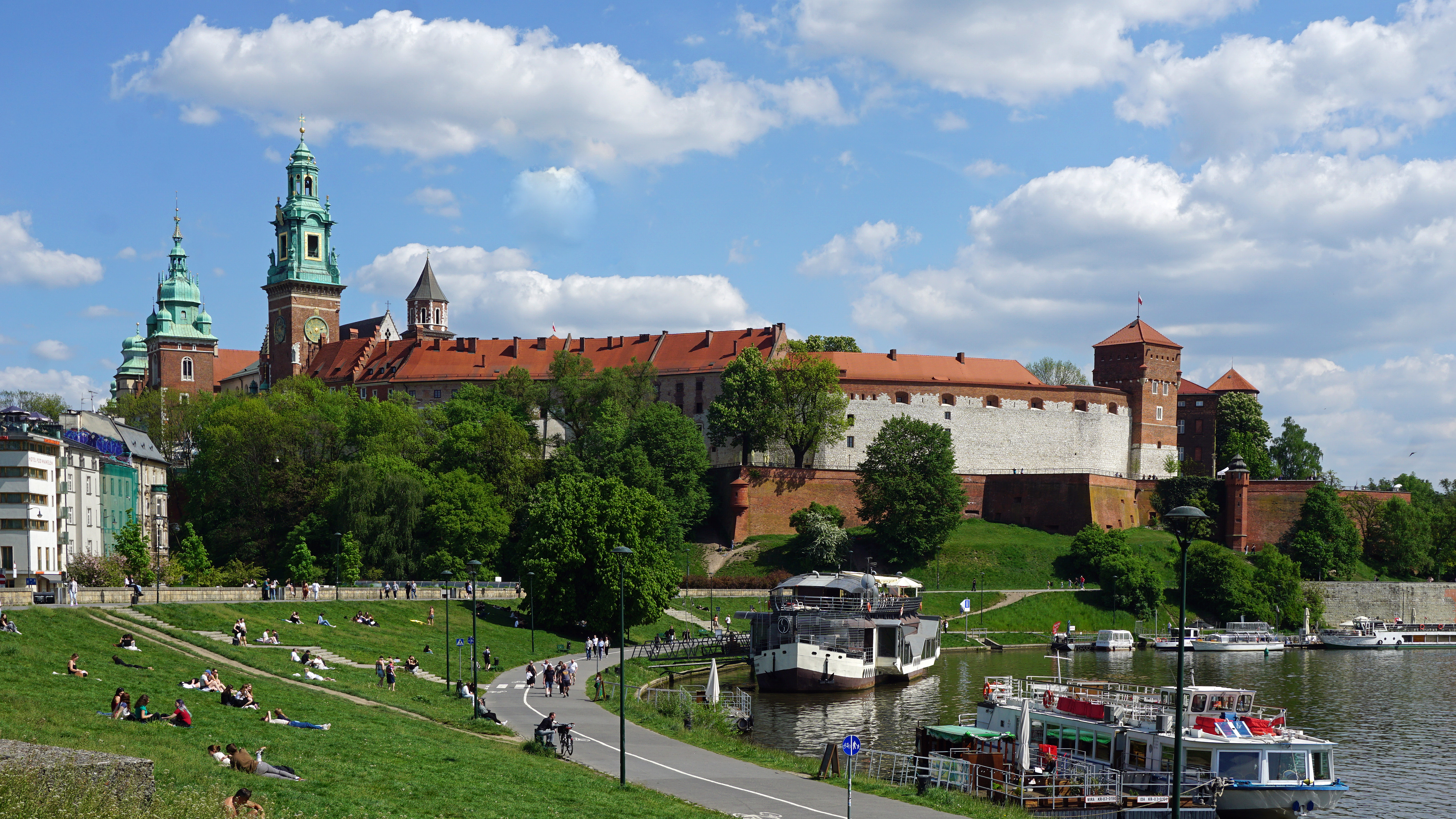
View from west
