= Raciborsko =

- Village
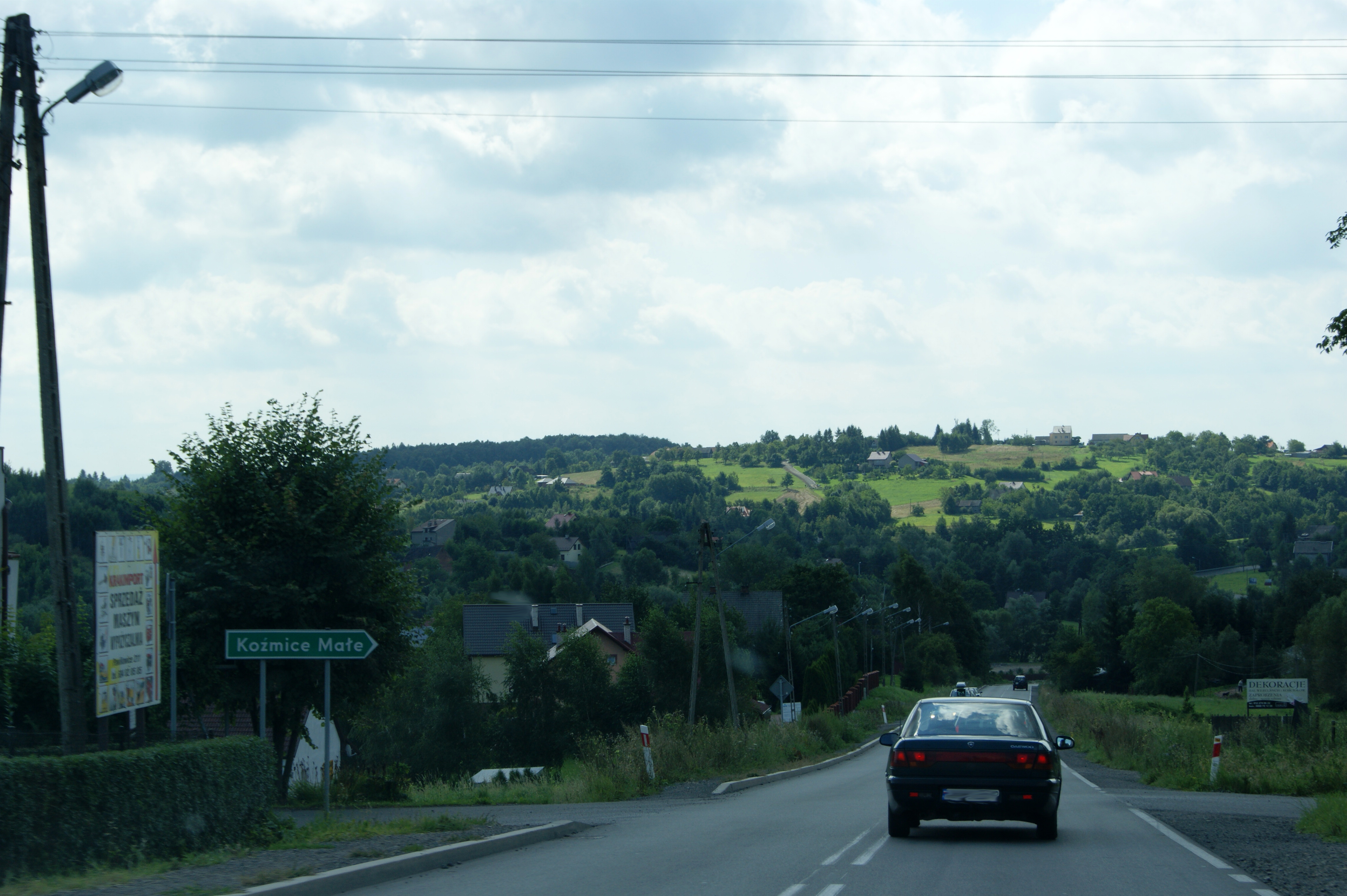

- Location within Poland
- Coordinates: 49°57′N 20°5′E
- Country: Poland
- Voivodeship: Lesser Poland
- County: Wieliczka
- Gmina: Wieliczka
- Population: 1,067

Raciborsko [rat͡ɕiˈbɔrskɔ] is a village in the administrative district of Gmina Wieliczka, within Wieliczka County, Lesser Poland Voivodeship, in southern Poland.
