= 2011 Vacansoleil–DCM season =

Cycling team season

2011 Vacansoleil–DCM season
Manager	Daan Luijkx
One-day victories	6
Stage race overall victories	2
Stage race stage victories	14
Previous season • Next season

The 2011 season for the Vacansoleil–DCM cycling team began in January at the Tour Down Under and ended in November at the Amstel Curaçao Race. As a UCI ProTeam, they were automatically invited and obligated to send a squad to every event in the UCI World Tour; Vacansoleil-DCM became a ProTeam for the first time ahead of the 2011 season.

Improving upon 14 victories in the 2010 season, Vacansoleil-DCM managed 22 victories during the season. Having previously been invited to the 2009 Vuelta a España, Vacansoleil-DCM contested the other Grand Tour events – the Giro d'Italia and the Tour de France – for the first time. Despite rumours that the team faced exclusion due to the doping scandals involving team members Riccardo Riccò and Ezequiel Mosquera, they were included pursuant to UCI rules. The team rarely featured in the Giro, while the team was more successful at the Tour de France. Johnny Hoogerland held the lead of the mountains classification on two occasions, while Romain Feillu finished in the top five on four stages during the first half of the race. Hoogerland also made headlines when he and Team Sky's Juan Antonio Flecha were sideswiped by a car while they rode in a breakaway. Outside of the Grand Tours, Thomas De Gendt took WorldTour stage victories at Paris–Nice and the Tour de Suisse, with Borut Božič also taking a stage win in Switzerland.

The team was also successful in single-day races, with six different riders all achieving a victory. Despite all the victories, the team finished last in the UCI World Tour rankings, since the majority of their victories came during UCI Europe Tour races. ProTeams, though eligible to participate in the races, were not eligible to earn points toward the Europe Tour ranking (just as Professional Continental teams were not eligible to earn points toward the World Tour ranking).

== 2011 roster ==
Ages as of January 1, 2011.

Rider	Date of birth
Santo Anzà (ITA)	November 17, 1980 (aged 30)
Maxim Belkov (RUS)	January 9, 1985 (aged 25)
Borut Božič (SLO)	August 8, 1980 (aged 30)
Matteo Carrara (ITA)	March 25, 1979 (aged 31)
Thomas De Gendt (BEL)	November 6, 1986 (aged 24)
Stijn Devolder (BEL)	August 29, 1979 (aged 31)
Romain Feillu (FRA)	April 6, 1984 (aged 26)
Gorik Gardeyn (BEL)	March 17, 1980 (aged 30)
Michał Gołaś (POL)	April 29, 1985 (aged 25)
Johnny Hoogerland (NED)	May 13, 1983 (aged 27)
Martijn Keizer (NED)	March 25, 1988 (aged 22)
Sergey Lagutin (UZB)	January 14, 1981 (aged 29)
Björn Leukemans (BEL)	July 1, 1977 (aged 33)
Pim Ligthart (NED)	June 16, 1988 (aged 22)
Bert-Jan Lindeman (Note: Rider joined the team on August 1 as a stagiaire.) (NED)	June 16, 1989 (aged 21)
Marco Marcato (ITA)	February 11, 1984 (aged 26)

Rider	Date of birth
Barry Markus (NED)	July 17, 1991 (aged 19)
Wouter Mol (NED)	April 17, 1982 (aged 28)
Ezequiel Mosquera (ESP)	November 19, 1975 (aged 35)
Jens Mouris (NED)	March 12, 1980 (aged 30)
Alberto Ongarato (ITA)	July 24, 1975 (aged 35)
Marcello Pavarin (ITA)	October 22, 1986 (aged 24)
Ruslan Pidgornyy (UKR)	July 25, 1977 (aged 33)
Wout Poels (NED)	October 1, 1987 (aged 23)
Riccardo Riccò (Note: Riccò was sacked by the team on February 19 for a violation of team rules.) (ITA)	September 1, 1983 (aged 27)
Rob Ruijgh (NED)	December 12, 1986 (aged 24)
Mirko Selvaggi (ITA)	February 11, 1985 (aged 25)
Joost van Leijen (NED)	July 20, 1984 (aged 26)
Frederik Veuchelen (BEL)	September 4, 1978 (aged 32)
Willem Wauters (BEL)	November 10, 1989 (aged 21)
Lieuwe Westra (NED)	September 11, 1982 (aged 28)

Riders who joined the team for the 2011 season

Rider	2010 team
Santo Anzà	Ceramica Flaminia
Maxim Belkov	ISD–NERI
Thomas De Gendt	Topsport Vlaanderen–Mercator
Stijn Devolder	Quick-Step
Martijn Keizer	Rabobank continental team
Pim Ligthart	neo-pro (stagiaire: Vacansoleil)
Ezequiel Mosquera	Xacobeo–Galicia
Marcello Pavarin	Colnago–CSF Inox
Ruslan Pidgornyy	ISD–NERI
Mirko Selvaggi	Astana

Riders who left the team during or after the 2010 season

Rider	2011 team
Brice Feillu	Leopard Trek
Martin Mortensen	Leopard Trek
Matthé Pronk	Marco Polo
Stéphane Rossetto	Nogent-sur-Oise
Bobbie Traksel	Landbouwkrediet
Arnoud Van Groen	Veranda's Willems–Accent

== One-day races ==
=== Spring classics ===
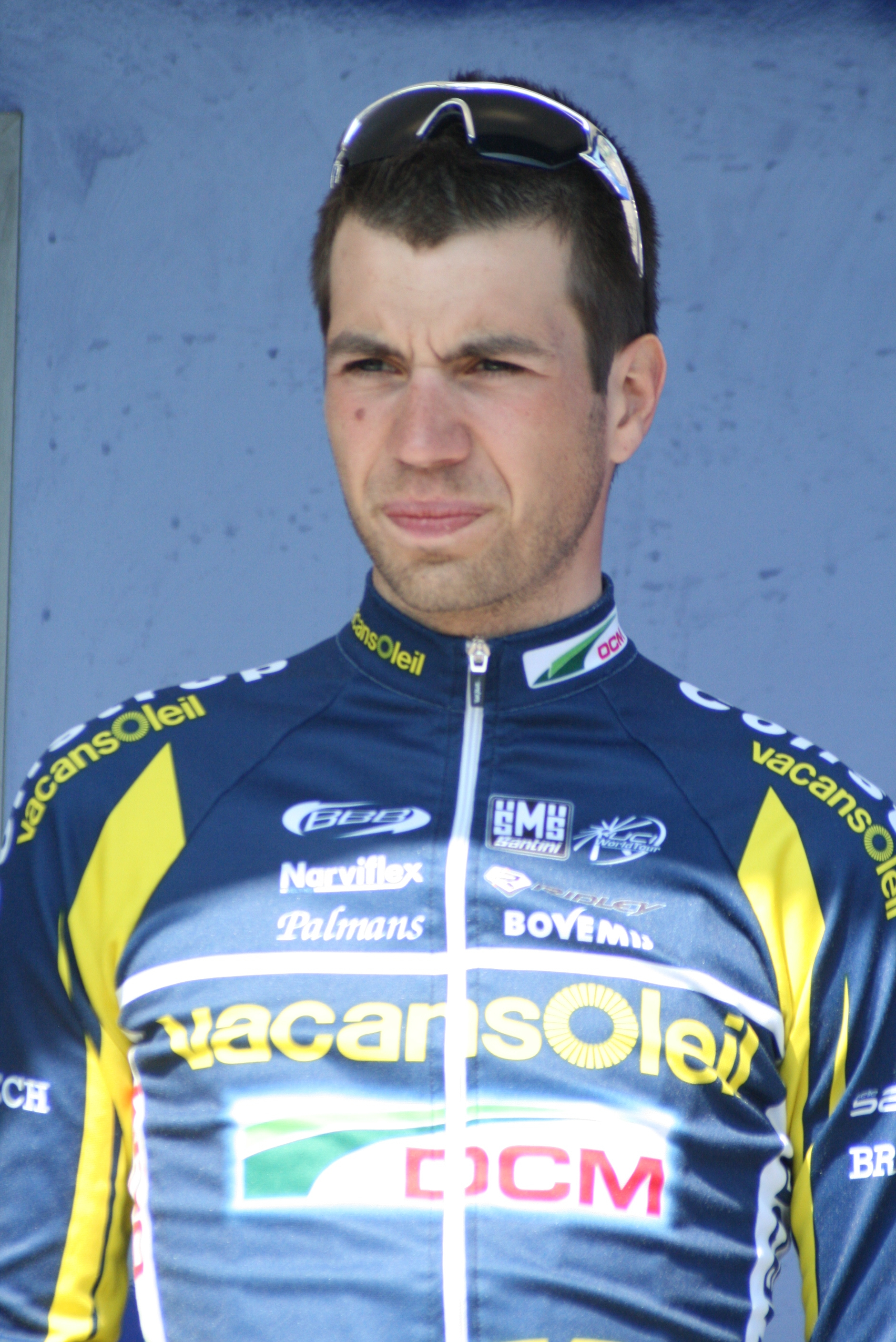
Martijn Keizer, pictured at the Four Days of Dunkirk, took his first professional victory by winning the Boucles de l'Aulne in May.

The team started the single-day season with a third-place finish for Feillu at the Grand Prix d'Ouverture La Marseillaise in January, and first-year professional Ligthart taking a similar placing in February's Clásica de Almería. In March, Westra took his first victory since the 2009 Tour de Picardie, by winning the Classic Loire Atlantique, in France. After creating a four-man breakaway with Anthony Geslin of FDJ, Saur–Sojasun's Jean-Marc Marino and Landbouwkrediet rider Frédéric Amorison, they were joined by five other riders within the last 5 km (3.1 mi); one of the five, Amorison's teammate Bert Scheirlinckx attacked in the closing stages but Westra followed and outsprinted him to the line, eventually winning by two seconds. Four days later, Marcato finished sixth in Dwars door Vlaanderen. Ligthart won his first race as a professional in April, by winning Hel van het Mergelland in a sprint finish of 26 riders.

The following day, Leukemans was in contention for victory at the Tour of Flanders, attacking off the front of the field on the Molenberg, remaining in contention with the persistent attacks by other riders within the last 50 km (31.1 mi) of the event; Leukemans was aided by De Gendt and Devolder, but could do no better than a seventh-place finish. In the Grand Prix Pino Cerami, Marcato finished in second place, having been part of an eleven-man breakaway formed with around 40 km (24.9 mi) remaining, before losing to Scheirlinckx in a two-man sprint after the two had jettisoned their fellow escapees. Leukemans suffered the same result in Brabantse Pijl, losing out to Omega Pharma–Lotto's Philippe Gilbert in another two-man sprint, after the two riders attacked off the front of a seven-man lead group. Following a second place at the Grand Prix de Denain, Feillu won the Tour du Finistère in mid-April, gapping the field in an uphill sprint to the line. Leukemans continued his good form into the Ardennes classics, taking seventh place in the Amstel Gold Race, and ninth in Liège–Bastogne–Liège.

May was not as successful for the team, as Marcato finished in sixth place in the Eschborn-Frankfurt City Loop at the start of the month, and Ruijgh took seventh place in the Grand Prix de Plumelec-Morbihan, towards the end of the month. Keizer took his first professional victory, by winning the Boucles de l'Aulne. From a breakaway of five riders, Keizer attacked in the closing stages and soloed to the win. While in June, Gardeyn finished fourth in the Tour de Rijke, Ruijgh finished second to Landbouwkrediet's Dirk Bellemakers in the Ruddervoorde Koerse national event, and Veuchelen finished eighth in Halle–Ingooigem.

The team also sent squads to the Omloop Het Nieuwsblad, Kuurne–Brussels–Kuurne, Le Samyn, the Nokere Koerse, the Handzame Classic, Milan – San Remo, the Cholet-Pays de Loire, E3 Prijs Vlaanderen – Harelbeke, Gent–Wevelgem, the Scheldeprijs, Paris–Roubaix, the Tro-Bro Léon, La Flèche Wallonne, the GP Herning, the Rund um Köln, the ProRace Berlin, and the Gullegem Koerse, but placed no higher than 12th in any of these races.

=== Fall races ===
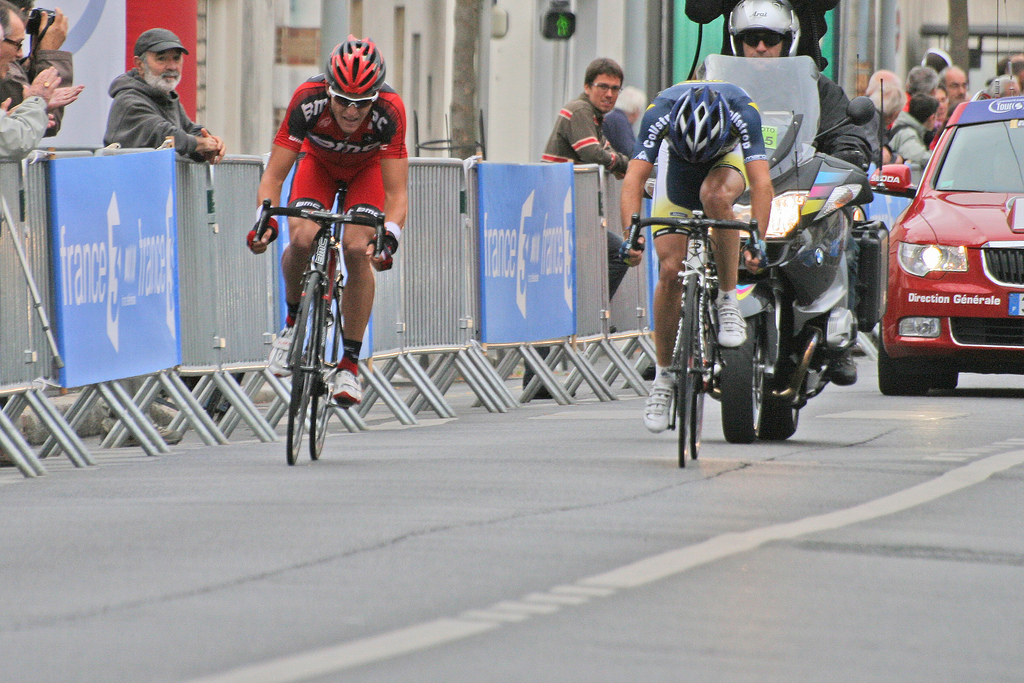
The finish of Paris–Tours, as BMC Racing Team's Greg Van Avermaet (left) outsprints Marco Marcato, who took his first professional win a week prior at the Tour de Vendée, for victory.

Shortly after the Tour de France, Božič took third place in the Vattenfall Cyclassics. Willem Wauters – who joined the team as a stagiaire in August – made an immediate impact for the team, finishing second behind SpiderTech–C10's Svein Tuft in the Grote Prijs Stad Zottegem, while the following day, Leukemans followed up his overall win from the Tour du Limousin with victory in Druivenkoers Overijse – for the second year in succession – beating Landbouwkrediet's Davy Commeyne and Jurgen Van Goolen of Veranda's Willems–Accent to the line.

The team achieved more top-ten placings in September, taking six within the space of a week; Božič finished ninth in the Memorial Rik Van Steenbergen, and sixth in Paris–Brussels, while Leukemans finished sixth in the Grand Prix Cycliste de Québec World Tour race, and third on his return to Europe, in the Grand Prix de Wallonie. Feillu and Marcato each took a seventh place in the Grand Prix de Fourmies, and the Grand Prix Cycliste de Montréal respectively. Mouris and Keizer finished third in Duo Normand, while on the same day, Božič finished fourth in the Grand Prix d'Isbergues. In October, Marcato took his first professional win in the Tour de Vendée, and also finished second to BMC Racing Team's Greg Van Avermaet in Paris–Tours, Feillu finished eighth in Paris–Bourges, and Devolder finished seventh in the Chrono des Nations time trial. Hoogerland completed the team's year, in November, with third place in the Amstel Curaçao Race.

The team also sent squads to the Clásica de San Sebastián, the Dutch Food Valley Classic, the Châteauroux Classic, the GP Ouest-France, the Schaal Sels-Merksem, the Grote Prijs Jef Scherens, the Kampioenschap van Vlaanderen, Omloop van het Houtland, Binche–Tournai–Binche, the Nationale Sluitingsprijs, and the Giro di Lombardia, but finished no higher than 11th in any of these races.

== Stage races ==
The team was very successful at the Tour Méditerranéen in February, as Feillu won three consecutive stages, along with the points classification, and Poels finished as the best young rider in third place overall, having finished in the same position on the final and most difficult stage. Westra finished third in the Volta ao Algarve, before De Gendt took the team's first World Tour stage win of the season, managing to just outlast the advancing field in a sprint finish to the opening stage of Paris–Nice. Feillu took another stage victory at May's Tour de Picardie, en route to an eventual overall victory in the race. The following week at the Circuit de Lorraine, De Gendt won the third stage – giving him the race lead for a time – and Feillu won the fifth and final stage, with De Gendt finishing at the top of the mountains classification, and the team won their respective classification. Westra won the opening prologue of the Tour of Belgium, with the squad eventually winning the teams classification. Feillu took his eighth victory of the season at June's Tour de Luxembourg, taking the final stage win.

Later in June, the team took two stage victories in the Tour de Suisse; in the fifth stage into Tägerschen, following an attack by Marcato, Božič took out the uphill sprint to the line, and on the seventh stage that finished in Austrian town Serfaus, De Gendt triumphed after breaking clear of a 17-man group with 25 km (15.5 mi) remaining on the stage, eventually winning the stage by over half a minute. Held concurrently with the Tour de France, van Leijen won the second stage of the Tour de Wallonie, with Selvaggi later finishing on top of the mountains classification, and the squad took another teams classification win. Poels claimed a stage win during the Tour de l'Ain in August, eventually finishing the race second overall after cracking from the race lead on the final stage, but did win the race's sprints classification. Hoogerland also took the team's sixth mountains classification win of the year. Leukemans completed the team's stage race successes with a stage and overall win at the Tour du Limousin.

The team also won lesser classifications at the Étoile de Bessèges, the Critérium International, the Three Days of De Panne, and the Tour de Pologne. The team also sent squads to the Tour Down Under, the Vuelta an Andalucía, Driedaagse van West-Vlaanderen, Vuelta a Murcia, Tirreno–Adriatico, the Volta a Catalunya, the Tour of the Basque Country, Ronde van Drenthe, the Tour de Romandie, the Four Days of Dunkirk, the Critérium du Dauphiné, the Delta Tour Zeeland, the Ster ZLM Toer, the Danmark Rundt, the Eneco Tour, the Tour of Britain, the Tour de Wallonie-Picarde, and the Tour of Beijing, but did not achieve a stage win, classification win, or podium finish in any of them.

== Grand Tours ==
=== Giro d'Italia ===
The UCI considered a potential revoking of Vacansoleil-DCM's ProTeam licence in mid-February, which would stop the team from automatically being invited to any World Tour race and be demoted to a Professional Continental team, as they were in 2010. This licence issue came to light due to continued investigations into doping regarding two of the team's riders; Mosquera and Riccò. Mosquera had tested positive for hydroxyethyl starch at the 2010 Vuelta a España, while Riccò had been admitted to hospital earlier in February, amid allegations that he had carried out a self-administered autologous blood transfusion at his home. (For more information on the Riccò allegations, see the Dismissal of Riccardo Riccò section)

Despite talk of a potential exclusion from the race due to these scandals, the team was included in the list of 23 teams admitted on March 7, per UCI rules. Carrara was the team's leader for the race, while Božič and Hoogerland were named to the squad to aim for stage wins and breakaway representation. The team's showing in the stage 1 team time trial was average, as they came home 10th of the 23 teams, 37 seconds off the winning pace set by HTC–Highroad. Božič finished near the front of the field in the Giro's first road stage, taking fifth in the mass sprint finish to the second stage, in Parma. Hoogerland and Selvaggi made breakaway attempts on stages 7 and 8, but neither could hold a sustainable advantage until the end of each stage. Carrara moved into the top ten overall after stage 9, finishing 14th on the race's first summit finish, at Mount Etna. Selvaggi took the team's only top-ten placing in the second half of the race by finishing eighth in a mass sprint finish on stage 12, while Carrara eventually finished the race as the team's highest placed rider in the general classification, finishing 17th overall.

=== Tour de France ===
Feillu was the team's leader for the Tour, leading a youthful team into the race, with three riders – De Gendt, Poels and Ruijgh – eligible for the young rider classification. Westra made the first breakaway of the Tour along with two other riders, while the team finished 20th of the 22 teams in the team time trial. It was not until stage 3 that the team finished highly; Feillu finished second behind Garmin–Cervélo's Tyler Farrar, with Božič also making it into the top ten, in eighth position. Hoogerland and Westra made breakaway manoeuvres on stages 4 and 6 respectively, but again could not muster a big enough advantage for a stage victory. Hoogerland did, however, take the lead of the mountains classification at the conclusion of the sixth stage, where Feillu had finished fourth and Marcato ninth. Feillu took another fourth place the following day on the seventh stage into Châteauroux.

Hoogerland made another break from the peloton on the ninth stage, as he was joined by five other riders who extended their lead over the field. With 36 km (22.4 mi) remaining, Hoogerland and fellow escapee Juan Antonio Flecha of Team Sky were involved in a dramatic crash; while attempting to overtake the riders, a support car from France Télévisions sideswiped Flecha, and as a result, caused Hoogerland to crash into a barbed wire fence, and would later require 33 stitches to close gashes on his leg. Prior to the crash, Hoogerland had gained enough points on the stage to retake the lead of the mountains classification from HTC–Highroad's Tejay van Garderen. Flecha and Hoogerland both finished the stage and were jointly awarded the combative rider award for the day. Marcato made the breakaway on stage ten, with Feillu and Božič again making the top ten at stage end; Feillu finished fifth with Božič three places behind, in eighth place. Feillu closed the first half of the race, with sixth place on stage 11.

None of the team's riders featured prominently in the early mountain stages, as it was not until stage 16 when Vacansoleil-DCM returned to the top ten of a stage result, with Marcato finishing eighth into Gap. Božič was tenth on stage 17 and seventh on the final stage, sandwiching two top ten placings for De Gendt, who finished sixth on stage 19 to Alpe d'Huez, and fourth on the following day's individual time trial. At the race's conclusion, the team's highest-placed rider was Ruijgh in 21st, some 33 minutes down on race winner Cadel Evans of BMC Racing Team.

=== Vuelta a España ===
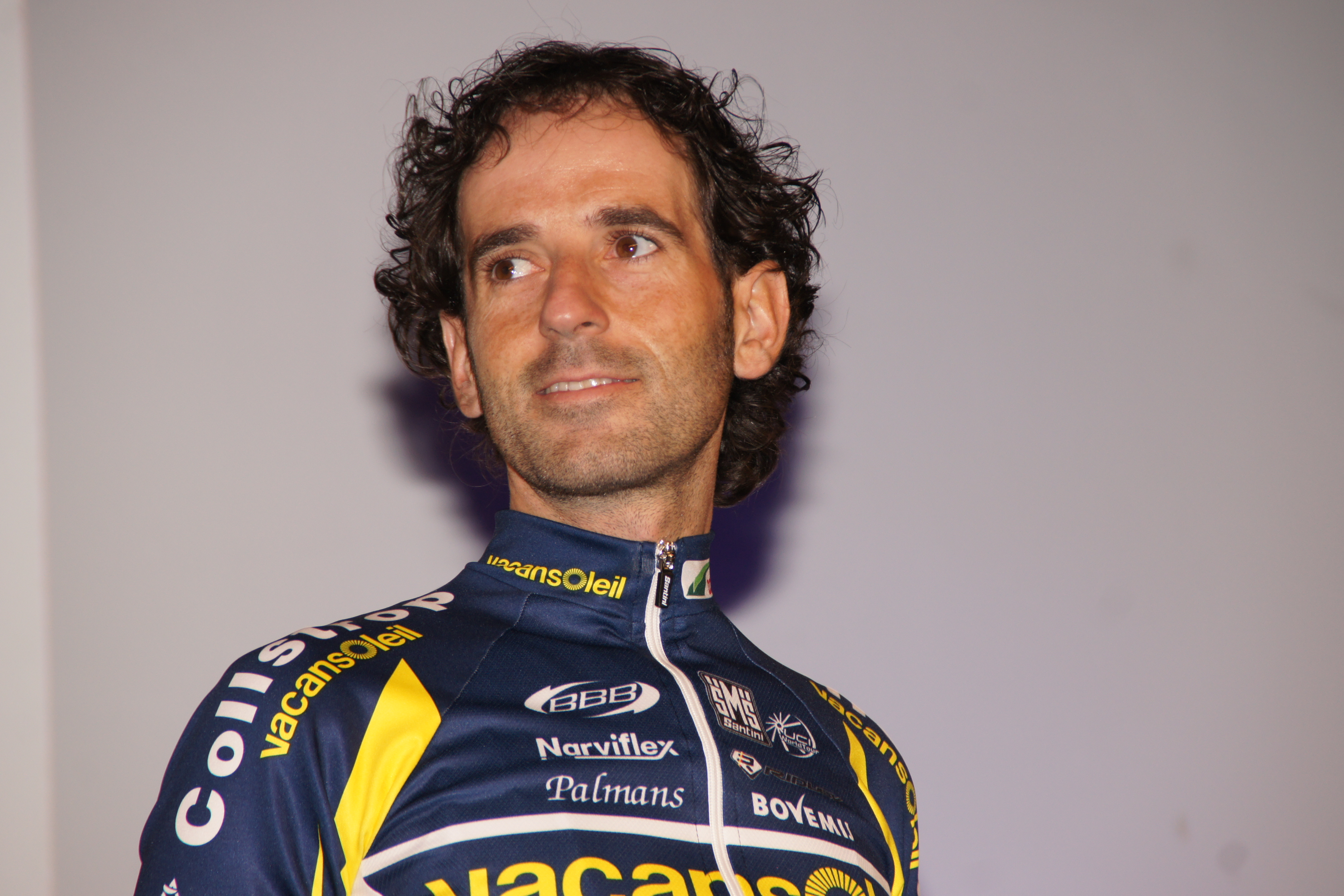
Ezequiel Mosquera, who was second for Xacobeo–Galicia in 2010, failed to start the 2011 race due to an ongoing investigation into a positive doping test.

Although the team had 2010 runner-up Mosquera on their books, they elected not to send him – having been on the team's pre-selection list – to the race due to the ongoing investigation into his positive doping case for hydroxyethyl starch. Instead, the team elected to place leadership upon the shoulders of Poels, who had taken second place and a stage victory in the Tour de l'Ain, held one week before the Vuelta. The team started with another mediocre performance in the team time trial, coming in 18th of the 22 teams, but Pidgornyy was part of a successful four-man breakaway on the third stage, and although he eventually finished 15 seconds down on the eventual stage winner Pablo Lastras (Movistar Team), Pidgornyy moved into fourth place in the general classification.

Poels featured in the top ten of the next two stages, the sharp incline to Sierra Nevada – finishing eighth, two places behind teammate Lagutin – and was the closest to Team Katusha's Joaquim Rodríguez on the steep finish into Valdepeñas de Jaén. He also tried to make a late-stage move, within the final 5 km (3.1 mi), on the eighth stage, but was unsuccessful, as he was swallowed up by the main field prior to the 20% gradient final climb to the line. Ligthart and Keizer made their way into the breakaway on stage 9, with both being dropped before the climb to La Covatilla. Pidgornyy made it into his second breakaway of the race, as the race moved into its second half, on stage 12, but he and Cofidis rider Luis Angel Maté were overhauled with just 6 km (3.7 mi) remaining.

As the race began to take shape in the Cantabrian Mountains, Poels continued his impressive Vuelta by again featuring in the top five of a stage, by taking fourth place on stage 14. Having stayed with the main group of overall contenders, Poels managed to stay with the likes of Team Sky's Bradley Wiggins and Chris Froome, while others such as Rodríguez and defending race winner Vincenzo Nibali of Liquigas–Cannondale had faded out of contention. The next day, the race headed to the summit finish of the Angliru for the first time in three years, and while Geox–TMC's Juan José Cobo soloed into his eventual race-winning general classification lead, Poels was his closest challenger, 48 seconds in arrears but enough to move him into the top ten overall. Poels slipped out of the top ten after losing time on the finish to Peña Cabarga, and thus tried to make a breakaway the following day, on stage 18, but was not given the freedom to break and finished with the main field. Poels ultimately finished the race 17th, but the team's best-placed rider honour went to Lagutin, who finished almost three minutes ahead in 15th place.

== Season victories ==
Date	Race	Competition	Rider	Country	Location
February 6	Étoile de Bessèges, Teams classification	UCI Europe Tour	(Note: The riders on the squad were Borut Božič, Stijn Devolder, Frederik Veuchelen, Gorik Gardeyn, Johnny Hoogerland, Björn Leukemans, Marco Marcato, and Lieuwe Westra)	France	
February 10	Tour Méditerranéen, Stage 2	UCI Europe Tour	Romain Feillu (FRA)	France	Rousset
February 11	Tour Méditerranéen, Stage 3	UCI Europe Tour	Romain Feillu (FRA)	France	La Farlède
February 12	Tour Méditerranéen, Stage 4	UCI Europe Tour	Romain Feillu (FRA)	France	Biot
February 13	Tour Méditerranéen, Young rider classification	UCI Europe Tour	Wout Poels (NED)	France	
March 6	Paris–Nice, Stage 1	UCI World Tour	Thomas De Gendt (BEL)	France	Houdan
March 19	Classic Loire Atlantique	UCI Europe Tour	Lieuwe Westra (NED)	France	La Haie-Fouassière
March 27	Critérium International, Mountains classification	UCI Europe Tour	Pim Ligthart (NED)	France	
March 31	Three Days of De Panne, Mountains classification	UCI Europe Tour	Lieuwe Westra (NED)	Belgium	
April 2	Hel van het Mergelland	UCI Europe Tour	Pim Ligthart (NED)	Netherlands	Eijsden
April 16	Tour du Finistère	UCI Europe Tour	Romain Feillu (FRA)	France	Quimper
May 14	Tour de Picardie, Stage 2	UCI Europe Tour	Romain Feillu (FRA)	France	Château-Thierry
May 15	Tour de Picardie, Overall	UCI Europe Tour	Romain Feillu (FRA)	France	
May 20	Circuit de Lorraine, Stage 3	UCI Europe Tour	Thomas De Gendt (BEL)	France	Saint-Dié-des-Vosges
May 22	Circuit de Lorraine, Stage 5	UCI Europe Tour	Romain Feillu (FRA)	France	Hayange
May 22	Circuit de Lorraine, Mountains classification	UCI Europe Tour	Thomas De Gendt (BEL)	France	
May 22	Circuit de Lorraine, Teams classification	UCI Europe Tour	(Note: The riders on the squad were Santo Anzà, Thomas De Gendt, Romain Feillu, Pim Ligthart, Ruslan Pidgornyy, Wout Poels, Marco Marcato, and Rob Ruijgh)	France	
May 25	Tour of Belgium, Prologue	UCI Europe Tour	Lieuwe Westra (NED)	Belgium	Buggenhout
May 29	Tour of Belgium, Young rider classification	UCI Europe Tour	Pim Ligthart (NED)	Belgium	
May 29	Tour of Belgium, Teams classification	UCI Europe Tour	(Note: The riders on the squad were Stijn Devolder, Gorik Gardeyn, Björn Leukemans, Jens Mouris, Pim Ligthart, Joost van Leijen, Lieuwe Westra, and Wouter Mol)	Belgium	
May 29	Boucles de l'Aulne	UCI Europe Tour	Martijn Keizer (NED)	France	Châteaulin
June 5	Tour de Luxembourg, Stage 4	UCI Europe Tour	Romain Feillu (FRA)	Luxembourg	Luxembourg City
June 15	Tour de Suisse, Stage 5	UCI World Tour	Borut Božič (SLO)	Switzerland	Tägerschen
June 17	Tour de Suisse, Stage 7	UCI World Tour	Thomas De Gendt (BEL)	Austria	Serfaus
July 24	Tour de Wallonie, Stage 2	UCI Europe Tour	Joost van Leijen (NED)	Belgium	Houffalize
July 27	Tour de Wallonie, Mountains classification	UCI Europe Tour	Mirko Selvaggi (ITA)	Belgium	
August 6	Tour de Pologne, Mountains classification	UCI World Tour	Michał Gołaś (POL)	Poland	
August 6	Tour de Pologne, Teams classification	UCI World Tour	(Note: The riders on the squad were Matteo Carrara, Ruslan Pidgornyy, Romain Feillu, Michał Gołaś, Martijn Keizer, Sergey Lagutin, Marco Marcato, and Wout Poels)	Poland	
August 12	Tour de l'Ain, Stage 3	UCI Europe Tour	Wout Poels (NED)	France	Lélex
August 13	Tour de l'Ain, Mountains classification	UCI Europe Tour	Johnny Hoogerland (NED)	France	
August 13	Tour de l'Ain, Sprints classification	UCI Europe Tour	Wout Poels (NED)	France	
August 16	Tour du Limousin, Stage 1	UCI Europe Tour	Björn Leukemans (BEL)	France	Guéret
August 19	Tour du Limousin, Overall	UCI Europe Tour	Björn Leukemans (BEL)	France	
August 24	Druivenkoers Overijse	UCI Europe Tour	Björn Leukemans (BEL)	Belgium	Overijse
October 2	Tour de Vendée	UCI Europe Tour	Marco Marcato (ITA)	France	La Roche-sur-Yon

== Away from competition ==
=== Dismissal of Riccardo Riccò ===
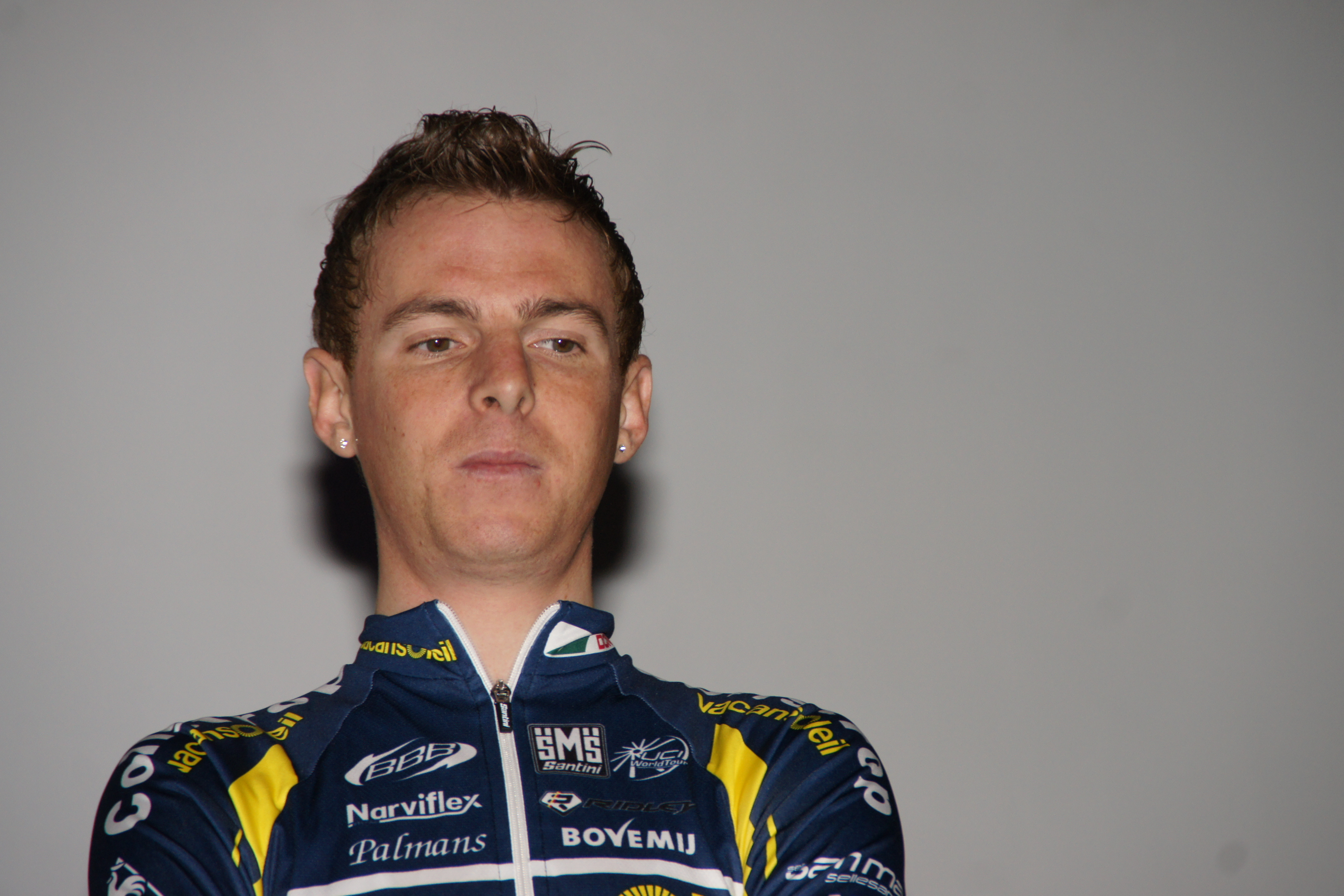
Riccardo Riccò, pictured at the team's presentation for the 2011 season, was sacked in February after reportedly confessing to blood doping.

Having made his season début with a seventh place in the Grand Prix d'Ouverture La Marseillaise in France on January 30, and prior to travelling to the Tour Méditerranéen, Riccò was admitted to hospital in Pavullo nel Frignano on February 6, with his father Rubinho stating that his son had apparent "kidney failure" and a body temperature of 104 °F (40 °C); he was later transferred to a hospital in Modena. Two days later, the Italian State Police confirmed that they were investigating Riccò for blood doping, after an apparent self-administered autologous blood transfusion at his home, and obtained his medical records while Riccò was in hospital recovering. His team also released a statement that day, calling the reports "a rumour", but started their own investigation into the matter, and if found to have doped, Riccò would be sacked as a violation of UCI anti-doping rules.

Personalities within the cycling world condemned Riccò for returning to doping, having already served a 20-month ban for the banned blood booster CERA in 2008. After conducting their investigation, the team announced that they had suspended Riccò on February 11, also indicating that they had sent a letter of their decision to Riccò. Following this scandal, as well as the continued allegations over teammate Mosquera in 2010, the UCI had planned to look at the credibility of having the team at the highest echelon of the sport – as a ProTeam – with Riccò's points making up a proportion of the team's allocation in regards to a ProTeam licence. Riccò was sacked by the team on February 19, on the basis of their "zero-tolerance policy" on doping. The team later announced a more stringent policy on how they deal with doping. Having previously given Leukemans a second chance after a positive test for artificial testosterone, team manager Daan Luijkx stated that the team would not give riders a second chance to prove their capabilities after Riccò's situation.

Riccò announced his intention to never race again in March, but signed with Continental team Meridiana-Kamen in June in the hope of competing in the Tour de Serbie. This did not transpire, as he was suspended by the Italian National Olympic Committee prior to the race, in relation to the February blood transfusion. He eventually received a twelve-year ban from the Italian National Anti-Doping Tribunal in April 2012.
