= 2010 Vacansoleil season =

2010 Vacansoleil season
Manager	Hilaire Van Der Schueren
One-day victories	5
Stage race overall victories	2
Stage race stage victories	7
Previous season • Next season

The 2010 season for the Vacansoleil cycling team began in January with the Grand Prix d'Ouverture La Marseillaise. As they did in their inaugural season in 2009, the team competes in 2010 as a UCI Professional Continental team with wildcard status, meaning they are eligible to be invited to any UCI ProTour event. The team's manager is Hilaire Van Der Schueren.

The team's biggest acquisitions for the 2010 season are Feillu brothers, both of them minor stars from a recent Tour de France while riding for Agritubel. Romain, the elder, wore the yellow jersey for a day in 2008, while younger brother Brice won a stage in 2009.

== 2010 roster ==
Ages as of January 1, 2010

Rider	Date of birth
Borut Božič (SLO)	August 8, 1980 (aged 29)
Matteo Carrara (ITA)	March 25, 1979 (aged 30)
Brice Feillu (FRA)	July 26, 1985 (aged 24)
Romain Feillu (FRA)	April 6, 1984 (aged 25)
Gorik Gardeyn (BEL)	March 17, 1980 (aged 29)
Michał Gołaś (POL)	April 29, 1985 (aged 24)
Johnny Hoogerland (NED)	May 13, 1983 (aged 26)
Sergey Lagutin (UZB)	January 14, 1981 (aged 28)
Bjorn Leukemans (BEL)	July 1, 1977 (aged 32)
Marco Marcato (ITA)	February 11, 1984 (aged 25)
Wouter Mol (NED)	April 17, 1982 (aged 27)

Rider	Date of birth
Jens Mouris (NED)	March 12, 1980 (aged 29)
Martin Mortensen (DEN)	November 5, 1984 (aged 25)
Alberto Ongarato (ITA)	July 24, 1975 (aged 34)
Wout Poels (NED)	October 1, 1987 (aged 22)
Matthé Pronk (NED)	July 1, 1974 (aged 35)
Stéphane Rossetto (FRA)	April 6, 1987 (age 37)
Rob Ruijgh (NED)	December 12, 1986 (aged 23)
Bobbie Traksel (NED)	November 3, 1981 (aged 28)
Arnoud van Groen (NED)	December 11, 1983 (aged 26)
Joost van Leijen (NED)	July 20, 1984 (aged 25)
Frederik Veuchelen (BEL)	September 4, 1978 (aged 31)
Lieuwe Westra (NED)	September 11, 1982 (aged 27)

Riders who joined the team for the 2010 season

Rider	2009 team
Brice Feillu	Agritubel
Romain Feillu	Agritubel
Gorik Gardeyn	Silence–Lotto
Michał Gołaś	Amica Chips–Knauf
Alberto Ongarato	LPR Brakes–Farnese Vini
Stéphane Rossetto	neo-pro
Rob Ruijgh	stagiaire (Vacansoleil)
Joost van Leijen	Van Vliet-EBH-Elshof

Riders who left the team during or after the 2009 season

Rider	2010 team
Baden Cooke	Team Saxo Bank
Wim De Vocht	Team Milram
Reinier Honig	Acqua & Sapone
Clément L'hôtellerie	Roubaix–Lille Métropole
Gerben Löwik	Omega Pharma–Lotto
Thijs van Amerongen	Free agent
Aart Vierhouten	Retired

== One-day races ==
=== Spring classics ===
The team opened its season at the Grand Prix d'Ouverture La Marseillaise. The squad for this event was chosen in December; Hoogerland was the leader, trying to improve upon a fifth-place finish in this race in 2009. Westra figured into the morning's breakaway, along with Jussi Veikkanen and Julien El Fares, and nearly managed to stay away, being caught with only a few kilometers left in the race's final climb. A selection was made among the 85-strong peloton that had caught Westra and Veikkanen, with six, including Hoogerland, contesting an uphill sprint finish. Hoogerland finished second behind Saur–Sojasun's Jonathan Hivert. Traksel won Kuurne–Brussels–Kuurne, on the first weekend of the traditional spring classics season, in brutally bad weather. Of the 198 riders who began the race, just 26 finished, as the rain and the cold combined with the hilly parcours to make for what was called the most difficult day of racing in the last seven years. Traksel outsprinted two breakaway companions, Ian Stannard and Rick Flens, for the win. Vacansoleil had had van Groen in first position on the road when Traksel made his eventually race-winning attack. Van Der Schueren told Traksel to drop back, yet the stocky Dutchman continued to ride away. Though happy to have won, he referred to the attack as "stupid" when asked after the race.

The team also raced Omloop Het Nieuwsblad and the Clásica de Almería.

== Stage races ==
Vacansoleil's first stage race of the season was the Étoile de Bessèges. The first stage ended in a mass sprint, won by Božič after the team overpowered Française des Jeux' leadout train. Božič followed it up with a similar win the next day. In February, Mol won the Tour of Qatar overall by figuring into a crucial stage 2 breakaway. He did not win any stage.

The team also sent squads to the Tour of Oman, the Tour Méditerranéen, the Volta ao Algarve, and the Ruta Del Sol.

== Grand Tours ==
The team did not receive invitations to either the Giro d'Italia or the Tour de France, despite the fact that both start in the Netherlands. It remains to be seen whether they will be invited to the Vuelta a España.

== Season victories ==
Date	Race	Competition	Rider	Country	Location
February 3	Étoile de Bessèges, Stage 1	UCI Europe Tour	Borut Božič (SLO)	France	Le Grau-du-Roi
February 4	Étoile de Bessèges, Stage 2	UCI Europe Tour	Borut Božič (SLO)	France	St. Ambroix
February 7	Étoile de Bessèges, Points classification	UCI Europe Tour	Borut Božič (SLO)	France	
February 12	Tour of Qatar, Overall	UCI Asia Tour	Wouter Mol (NED)	Qatar	
February 25	Ruta Del Sol, Mountains classification	UCI Europe Tour	Brice Feillu (FRA)	Spain	
February 28	Kuurne–Brussels–Kuurne	UCI Europe Tour	Bobbie Traksel (NED)	Belgium	Kuurne
March 21	Ronde van het Groene Hart	UCI Europe Tour	Jens Mouris (NED)	Netherlands	Zoetermeer
April 1	Three Days of De Panne, Teams classification	UCI Europe Tour	(Note: The riders on the squad were Lieuwe Westra, Romain Feillu, Matthé Pronk, Jens Mouris, Gorik Gardeyn, Bobbie Traksel, Alberto Ongarato, and Borut Božič)	Belgium	
April 10	Ronde van Drenthe	UCI Europe Tour	Alberto Ongarato (ITA)	Netherlands	Hoogeveen
June 6	Tour de Luxembourg, Overall classification	UCI Europe Tour	Matteo Carrara (ITA)	Luxembourg	
August 7	Tour de Pologne, Mountains classification	UCI World Ranking	Johnny Hoogerland (NED)	Poland	
August 7	Tour de Pologne, Sprints classification	UCI World Ranking	Johnny Hoogerland (NED)	Poland	
August 7	Vuelta a Burgos, Stage 4	UCI Europe Tour	Romain Feillu (FRA)	Spain	Salas de los Infantes
August 12	Tour de l'Ain, Stage 2	UCI Europe Tour	Romain Feillu (FRA)	France	Trévoux
August 14	Tour de l'Ain, Stage 4	UCI Europe Tour	Wout Poels (NED)	France	Belley
August 14	Tour de l'Ain, Points classification	UCI Europe Tour	Romain Feillu (FRA)	France	
August 25	Druivenkoers Overijse	UCI Europe Tour	Björn Leukemans (BEL)	Belgium	Overijse
September 12	Grand Prix de Fourmies	UCI Europe Tour	Romain Feillu (FRA)	France	Fourmies
September 14	Tour of Britain, Stage 4	UCI Europe Tour	Wout Poels (NED)	Great Britain	Teignmouth
September 17	Tour of Britain, Stage 7	UCI Europe Tour	Borut Božič (SLO)	Great Britain	Colchester
September 18	Tour of Britain, Sprints classification	UCI Europe Tour	Michał Gołaś (POL)	Great Britain	
September 18	Tour of Britain, Mountains classification	UCI Europe Tour	Johnny Hoogerland (NED)	Great Britain	
September 18	Tour of Britain, Teams classification	UCI Europe Tour	(Note: The riders on the squad were Borut Božič, Michał Gołaś, Johnny Hoogerland, Pim Ligthart, Matteo Carrara, and Wout Poels)	Great Britain	
