= 2012 Vacansoleil–DCM season =

2012 Vacansoleil–DCM season
Manager	Daan Luijkx
One-day victories	6
Stage race overall victories	1
Stage race stage victories	8
Previous season • Next season

The 2012 season for Vacansoleil–DCM began in January at the Tour Down Under. As a UCI ProTeam, they were automatically invited and obligated to send a squad to every event in the UCI World Tour.

== 2012 roster ==
Ages as of 1 January 2012.

Rider	Date of birth
Kris Boeckmans (BEL)	13 February 1987 (aged 24)
Matteo Carrara (ITA)	25 March 1979 (aged 32)
Thomas De Gendt (BEL)	6 November 1986 (aged 25)
Stefan Denifl (AUT)	20 September 1987 (aged 24)
Stijn Devolder (BEL)	29 August 1979 (aged 32)
Romain Feillu (FRA)	16 April 1984 (aged 27)
Jasper Hamelink (Note: Hamelink joined the team on 1 August, as a stagiaire, from Cycling Team Jo Piels.) (NED)	12 January 1990 (aged 21)
Johnny Hoogerland (NED)	13 May 1983 (aged 28)
Martijn Keizer (NED)	25 March 1988 (aged 23)
Wesley Kreder (Note: Kreder joined the team on 1 August, as a stagiaire, from the Rabobank Continental team.) (NED)	4 November 1990 (aged 21)
Sergey Lagutin (UZB)	14 January 1981 (aged 30)
Maurits Lammertink (Note: Lammertink joined the team on 25 June.) (NED)	31 August 1990 (aged 21)
Gustav Larsson (SWE)	20 September 1980 (aged 31)
Björn Leukemans (BEL)	1 July 1977 (aged 34)
Pim Ligthart (NED)	16 June 1988 (aged 23)
Bert-Jan Lindeman (NED)	16 June 1989 (aged 22)

Rider	Date of birth
Marco Marcato (ITA)	11 February 1984 (aged 27)
Tomasz Marczyński (POL)	6 March 1984 (aged 27)
Barry Markus (NED)	17 July 1991 (aged 20)
Wouter Mol (NED)	17 April 1982 (aged 29)
Jacek Morajko (POL)	26 April 1981 (aged 30)
Martin Mortensen (DEN)	5 November 1984 (aged 27)
Nikita Novikov (RUS)	10 November 1989 (aged 22)
Marcello Pavarin (ITA)	22 October 1986 (aged 25)
Wout Poels (NED)	1 October 1987 (aged 24)
Rob Ruijgh (NED)	12 November 1986 (aged 25)
Mirko Selvaggi (ITA)	11 February 1985 (aged 26)
Rafael Valls (ESP)	25 June 1987 (aged 24)
Kenny van Hummel (NED)	30 September 1982 (aged 29)
Kevin van Impe (Note: Van Impe announced his retirement from the sport on 23 March.) (BEL)	19 April 1981 (aged 30)
Frederik Veuchelen (BEL)	4 September 1978 (aged 33)
Willem Wauters (Note: Wauters joined the team on 1 August, as a stagiaire, from the Lotto-Belisol under-23 team.) (BEL)	10 November 1989 (aged 22)
Lieuwe Westra (NED)	11 September 1982 (aged 29)

Riders who joined the team for the 2012 season

Rider	2011 team
Kenny van Hummel	Skil–Shimano
Kris Boeckmans	Topsport Vlaanderen–Mercator
Bert-Jan Lindeman	stagiaire (Vacansoleil–DCM; Jo Piels)
Barry Markus	stagiaire (Vacansoleil–DCM; Rabobank continental team)
Gustav Larsson	Saxo Bank–SunGard
Stefan Denifl	Leopard Trek
Martin Mortensen	Leopard Trek
Kevin van Impe	Quick-Step
Rafael Valls	Geox–TMC
Tomasz Marczyński	CCC–Polsat–Polkowice
Jacek Morajko	CCC–Polsat–Polkowice
Nikita Novikov	Itera–Katusha

Riders who left the team during or after the 2011 season

Rider	2012 team
Michał Gołaś	Omega Pharma–Quick-Step
Jens Mouris	GreenEDGE
Borut Božič	Astana
Maxim Belkov	Team Katusha
Joost van Leijen	Lotto–Belisol
Gorik Gardeyn	Champion System
Santo Anzà	None
Ezequiel Mosquera	Sacked following doping suspension
Alberto Ongarato	None
Ruslan Pidgornyy	None

== Season victories ==
Date	Race	Competition	Rider	Country	Location
4 February	Étoile de Bessèges, Stage 4	UCI Europe Tour	Marco Marcato (ITA)	France	Bagnols-sur-Cèze
5 February	Étoile de Bessèges, Mountains classification	UCI Europe Tour	Bert-Jan Lindeman (NED)	France	
4 March	Paris–Nice, Stage 1	UCI World Tour	Gustav Larsson (SWE)	France	Saint-Rémy-lès-Chevreuse
4 March	Vuelta a Murcia, Mountains classification	UCI Europe Tour	Tomasz Marczyński (POL)	Spain	
8 March	Paris–Nice, Stage 5	UCI World Tour	Lieuwe Westra (NED)	France	Mende
10 March	Ronde van Drenthe	UCI Europe Tour	Bert-Jan Lindeman (NED)	Netherlands	Coevorden
10 March	Paris–Nice, Stage 7	UCI World Tour	Thomas De Gendt (BEL)	France	Nice
11 March	Paris–Nice, Mountains classification	UCI World Tour	Frederik Veuchelen (BEL)	France	
11 March	Paris–Nice, Teams classification	UCI World Tour	(Note: The riders on the squad were Romain Feillu, Kris Boeckmans, Thomas De Gendt, Sergey Lagutin, Gustav Larsson, Björn Leukemans, Frederik Veuchelen and Lieuwe Westra)	France	
13 March	Tirreno–Adriatico, Young rider classification	UCI World Tour	Wout Poels (NED)	Italy	
25 March	Volta a Catalunya, Sprints classification	UCI World Tour	Tomasz Marczyński (POL)	Spain	
12 May	Tour de Picardie, Stage 2	UCI Europe Tour	Kenny van Hummel (NED)	France	Villers-Bocage
26 May	Giro d'Italia, Stage 20	UCI World Tour	Thomas De Gendt (BEL)	Italy	Passo dello Stelvio
27 May	Giro d'Italia, TV classification	UCI World Tour	Martijn Keizer (NED)	Italy	
2 June	Tour de Luxembourg, Stage 3	UCI Europe Tour	Wout Poels (NED)	Luxembourg	Differdange
3 June	Tour de Luxembourg, Young rider classification	UCI Europe Tour	Wout Poels (NED)	Luxembourg	
7 June	Grand Prix of Aargau Canton	UCI Europe Tour	Sergey Lagutin (UZB)	Switzerland	Gippingen
16 July	Tour de Pologne, Mountains classification	UCI World Tour	Tomasz Marczyński (POL)	Poland	
22 August	Druivenkoers Overijse	UCI Europe Tour	Björn Leukemans (BEL)	Belgium	Overijse
25 August	Danmark Rundt, Stage 5	UCI Europe Tour	Lieuwe Westra (NED)	Denmark	Kerteminde
26 August	Danmark Rundt, Overall	UCI Europe Tour	Lieuwe Westra (NED)	Denmark	
29 August	Stadsprijs Geraardsbergen	National event	Björn Leukemans (BEL)	Belgium	Geraardsbergen
7 October	Paris–Tours	UCI Europe Tour	Marco Marcato (ITA)	France	Tours
14 October	Tour de Vendée	UCI Europe Tour	Wesley Kreder (NED) (Note: Kreder won the race as a stagiaire.)	France	La Roche-sur-Yon
