= 2013 Vacansoleil–DCM season =

2013 Vacansoleil–DCM season
Manager	Daan Luijkx
One-day victories	2
Stage race overall victories	–
Stage race stage victories	6
Previous season

The 2013 season for Vacansoleil–DCM began in January at the Tour Down Under. As a UCI ProTeam, they were automatically invited and obligated to send a squad to every event in the UCI World Tour.

== Team roster ==
As of 9 September 2013.

Rider	Date of birth
Kris Boeckmans (BEL)	13 February 1987 (age 39)
Grega Bole (SLO)	13 August 1985 (age 41)
Thomas De Gendt (BEL)	6 November 1986 (age 39)
Romain Feillu (FRA)	16 April 1984 (age 42)
Juan Antonio Flecha (ESP)	17 September 1977 (age 48)
Johnny Hoogerland (NED)	13 May 1983 (age 43)
Martijn Keizer (NED)	25 March 1988 (age 38)
Wesley Kreder (NED)	4 November 1990 (age 35)
Sergey Lagutin (UZB)	14 January 1981 (age 45)
Maurits Lammertink (NED)	31 August 1990 (age 35)
Björn Leukemans (BEL)	1 July 1977 (age 49)
Pim Ligthart (NED)	16 June 1988 (age 38)
Bert-Jan Lindeman (NED)	16 June 1989 (age 37)
Marco Marcato (ITA)	11 February 1984 (age 42)

Rider	Date of birth
Tomasz Marczyński (POL)	6 March 1984 (age 42)
Barry Markus (NED)	17 July 1991 (age 35)
Wouter Mol (NED)	17 April 1982 (age 44)
Nikita Novikov (RUS)	10 November 1989 (age 36)
Rob Ruijgh (NED)	12 November 1986 (age 39)
José Rujano (Note: Rujano left the team on 24 June, later announcing his retirement from cycling.) (VEN)	18 February 1982 (age 44)
Mirko Selvaggi (ITA)	11 February 1985 (age 41)
Rafael Valls (ESP)	25 June 1987 (age 39)
Kenny van Hummel (NED)	30 September 1982 (age 43)
Boy van Poppel (NED)	18 January 1988 (age 38)
Danny van Poppel (NED)	26 July 1993 (age 33)
Frederik Veuchelen (BEL)	4 September 1978 (age 47)
Willem Wauters (BEL)	10 November 1989 (age 36)
Lieuwe Westra (NED)	11 September 1982 (age 43)

Riders who joined the team for the 2013 season

Rider	2012 team
Grega Bole	Lampre–ISD
Juan Antonio Flecha	Team Sky
Wesley Kreder	Rabobank Continental Team
José Rujano	Androni Giocattoli–Venezuela
Boy van Poppel	UnitedHealthcare
Danny van Poppel	Rabobank Continental Team
Willem Wauters	neo-pro (Lotto-Belisol U23)

Riders who left the team during or after the 2012 season

Rider	2013 team
Matteo Carrara	Retired
Stefan Denifl	IAM Cycling
Stijn Devolder	RadioShack–Leopard
Gustav Larsson	IAM Cycling
Jacek Morajko	CCC–Polsat–Polkowice
Martin Mortensen	Concordia Forsikring–Riwal
Kevin van Impe	Retired

== Season victories ==
Date	Race	Competition	Rider	Country	Location
24 March	Volta a Catalunya, Stage 7	UCI World Tour	Thomas De Gendt (BEL)	Spain	Barcelona
12 May	Tour of California, Stage 1	UCI America Tour	Lieuwe Westra (NED)	United States	Escondido
16 June	Ster ZLM Toer, Stage 5	UCI Europe Tour	Pim Ligthart (NED)	Netherlands	Boxtel
16 June	Ster ZLM Toer, Mountains classification	UCI Europe Tour	Martijn Keizer (NED)	Netherlands	
3 August	Tour de Pologne, Mountains classification	UCI World Tour	Tomasz Marczyński (POL)	Poland	
8 August	Arctic Race of Norway, Stage 1	UCI Europe Tour	Kenny van Hummel (NED)	Norway	Bodø
11 August	Tour de l'Ain, Stage 2	UCI Europe Tour	Grega Bole (SLO)	France	Oyonnax
13 August	Tour de l'Ain, Stage 4	UCI Europe Tour	Wout Poels (NED)	France	Belley
21 August	Druivenkoers Overijse	UCI Europe Tour	Björn Leukemans (BEL)	Belgium	Overijse
2 November	Amstel Curaçao Race	National event	Johnny Hoogerland (NED)	Curaçao	Willemstad
