= 2010 Kuurne–Brussels–Kuurne =

Race details
- Dates: 28 February 2010
- Stages: 1
- Distance: 194 km (120.5 mi)
- Winning time: 4h 43' 16"

Results
	Winner	Bobby Traksel (NED)	(Vacansoleil)
	Second	Rick Flens (NED)	(Rabobank)
	Third	Ian Stannard (GBR)	(Team Sky)

The 63rd edition of Kuurne–Brussels–Kuurne was won by Dutch rider Bobby Traksel. The race was affected by heavy rainfall from start to finish. Only 26 riders finished.

== Race report ==
The race was run in extreme weather, as the remnants of cyclone Xynthia hit Belgium, with strong winds and torrential rain causing the peloton to shatter early. Many abandoned the race before half-course, including favourites Tom Boonen and Filippo Pozzato. The route had to be shortened by 20 km because a fallen tree obstructed the road up the Côte de Trieu. The edition was won by Dutch outsider Bobby Traksel who outsprinted his breakaway companions Rick Flens and Ian Stannard. Only 26 of 195 riders finished the race.

== Results ==
Result
Rank	Rider	Team	Time
1	Bobby Traksel (NED)	Vacansoleil	4hr 43' 16"
2	Rick Flens (NED)	Rabobank	s.t.
3	Ian Stannard (GBR)	Team Sky	+ 2"
4	Hayden Roulston (NZL)	Team HTC–Columbia	+ 1' 00"
5	Dominique Rollin (CAN)	Cervélo TestTeam	+ 2' 59"
6	Thor Hushovd (NOR)	Cervélo TestTeam	s.t.
7	Sébastien Turgot (FRA)	Bbox Bouygues Telecom	+ 5' 40"
8	Davy Commeyne (BEL)	Landbouwkrediet	+ 5' 43"
9	Grégory Rast (SUI)	Team RadioShack	+ 5' 54"
10	Sebastian Langeveld (NED)	Rabobank	+ 5' 55"
