= Santo Anzà =

Italian cyclist

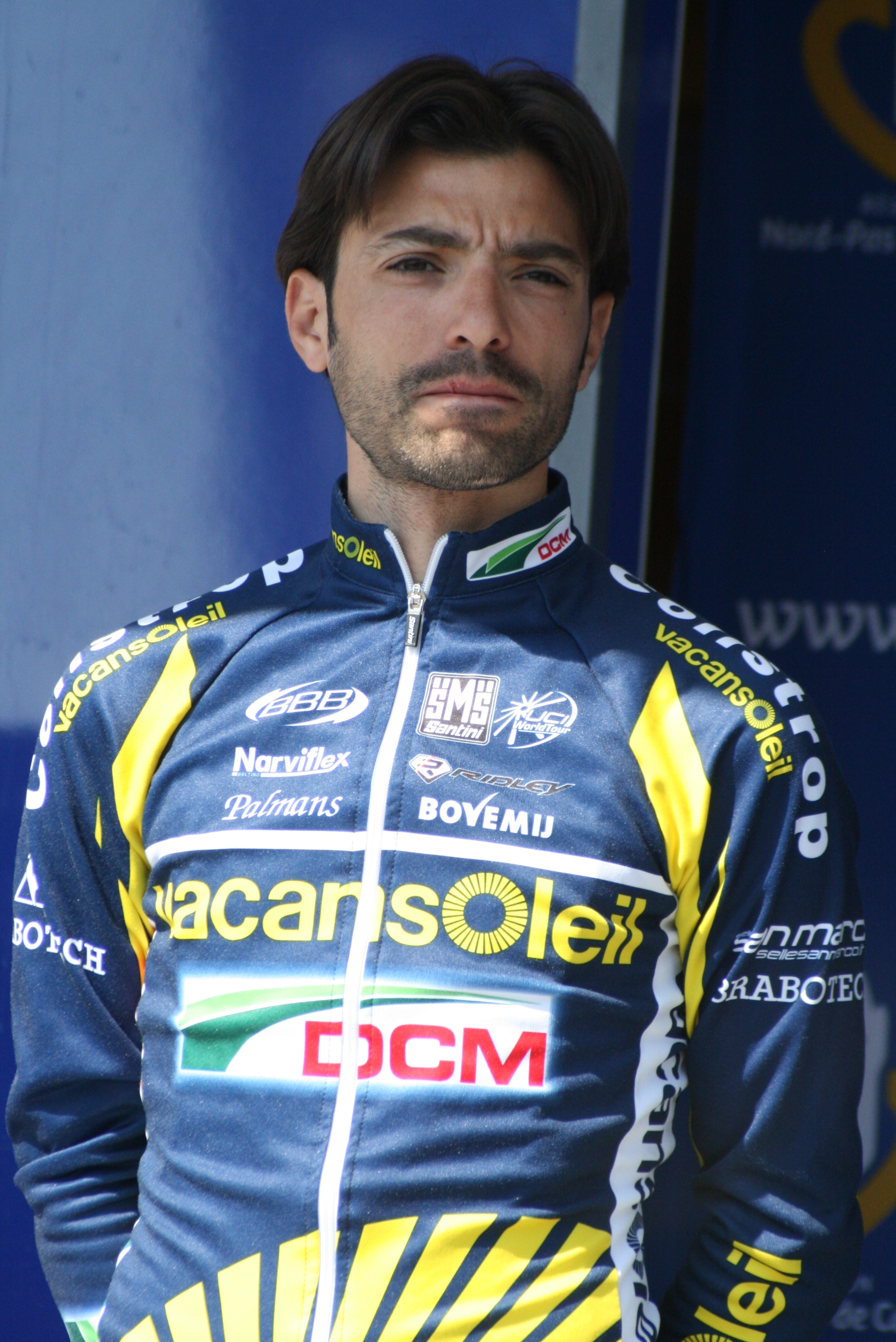

Personal information
- Full name: Santo Anzà
- Born: 17 November 1980 (age 45) Catania, Italy

Cycling career
- Sport: Cycling
- Discipline: Road
- Role: Rider

Professional teams
- 2002: →Landbouwkrediet–Colnago (stagiaire)
- 2003–2004: Landbouwkrediet–Colnago
- 2005: Acqua & Sapone–Adria Mobil
- 2006–2008: Selle Italia–Diquigiovanni
- 2009: Amica Chips–Knauf
- 2009: ISD–NERI
- 2010: Ceramica Flaminia
- 2011: Vacansoleil–DCM

Major wins
- Brixia Tour (2008)

Santo Anzà (born 17 November 1980 in Catania, Italy) is an Italian former professional road racing cyclist, who last rode for the UCI ProTeam Vacansoleil–DCM, which he signed with in 2011.

== Career achievements ==
=== Major results ===
2002
4th GP Palio del Recioto
5th Overall GP Kranj
2004
9th Giro di Romagna
2005
4th Overall Vuelta a Burgos
4th Trofeo Melinda
10th Giro di Lombardia
10th Coppa Sabatini
2006
1st Giro della Romagna
3rd Gran Premio Fred Mengoni
3rd Trofeo Melinda
4th Giro dell'Emilia
4th Giro dell'Appennino
5th Coppa Agostoni
6th Tre Valli Varesine
7th Giro del Lazio
7th GP Industria & Commercio di Prato
8th Overall Brixia Tour
8th GP Industria & Artigianato di Larciano
2007
1st Trofeo Melinda
2nd Overall Brixia Tour
5th Giro del Lazio
6th Coppa Placci
2008
1st Overall Brixia Tour

1st Stage 4

5th Trofeo Melinda
8th Tre Valli Varesine
8th Giro dell'Appennino
2009
3rd Overall Brixia Tour

1st Stage 4

8th Trofeo Melinda

=== Grand Tour general classification results timeline ===
Grand Tour	2006	2007	2008	2009	2010	2011
Giro d'Italia	109	—	—	—	—	—
Tour de France	—	—	—	—	—	—
Vuelta a España	—	—	—	—	—	47

Legend
DSQ	Disqualified
DNF	Did not finish
