= Amica Chips–Knauf =

Team information
- UCI code: AMI
- Registered: San Marino
- Founded: 2008
- Disbanded: 2009
- Discipline: Road
- Status: Professional Continental

Key personnel
- Team manager: Simone Mori

Team name history
- 2008 2009: Nippo–Endeka; Amica Chips–Knauf

Amica Chips–Knauf (UCI team code: AMI) was a UCI Professional Continental team based in San Marino that participated in UCI Continental Circuits. It formed in 2008 by signing riders most of that year.

The team folded partway through its first season, after the UCI suspended it due to not paying its riders.

== Team roster ==
As of April 30, 2009.

Rider	Date of birth
Santo Anzà (ITA)	November 17, 1980 (age 45)
Igor Astarloa (ESP)	March 29, 1976 (age 50)
Leonardo Bertagnolli (ITA)	January 8, 1978 (age 48)
Grega Bole (SLO)	August 13, 1985 (age 41)
Simone Cadamuro (ITA)	June 28, 1976 (age 50)
Simon Clarke (AUS)	July 18, 1986 (age 40)
Giuseppe de Maria (ITA)	August 30, 1984 (age 42)
Fausto Fognini (ITA)	November 10, 1985 (age 40)
Vincenzo Garofalo (ITA)	August 5, 1982 (age 44)
Edoardo Girardi (ITA)	October 22, 1985 (age 40)

Rider	Date of birth
Michał Gołaś (POL)	April 29, 1984 (age 42)
Rafael Infantino (COL)	August 28, 1984 (age 42)
Robert Kišerlovski (CRO)	August 9, 1986 (age 40)
Andrei Kunitski (BLR)	July 2, 1984 (age 42)
Matija Kvasina (CRO)	December 4, 1981 (age 44)
Eddy Ratti (ITA)	April 4, 1977 (age 49)
Francesco Rivera (ITA)	July 6, 1983 (age 43)
Branislau Samoilau (BLR)	May 25, 1985 (age 41)
Mirko Selvaggi (ITA)	February 11, 1985 (age 41)
Paolo Tomaselli (ITA)	September 11, 1983 (age 42)
