= Marcello Pavarin =

Italian cyclist

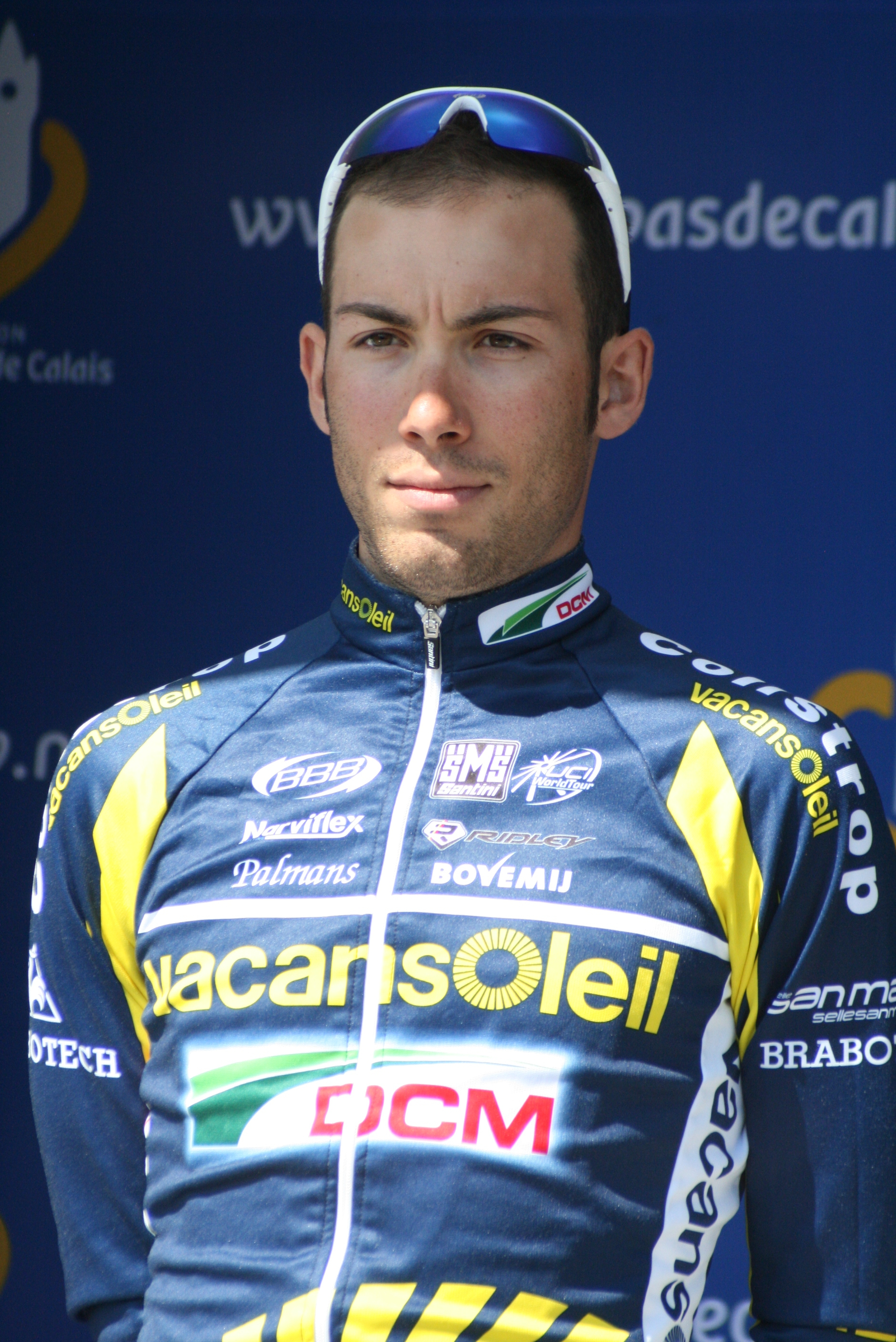
- Pavarin at the 2011 Four Days of Dunkirk.

Personal information
- Full name: Marcello Pavarin
- Born: 22 October 1986 (age 39) Rovigo, Italy
- Height: 1.78 m (5 ft 10 in)
- Weight: 68 kg (150 lb)

Cycling career
- Sport: Cycling
- Current team: Vacansoleil–DCM
- Discipline: Road
- Role: Rider

Professional teams
- 2009–2010: CSF Group–Navigare
- 2011–: Vacansoleil–DCM

Marcello Pavarin (born 22 October 1986) is a professional Italian road cyclist, who last rode for Vacansoleil–DCM.

== Palmarès ==
2006
4th Gran Premio della Liberazione
2007
10th Giro del Canavese
2008
3rd Gran Premio della Liberazione
7th Giro del Cigno
2009
7th Coppa Sabatini
2010
8th Gran Premio Nobili Rubinetterie – Coppa Città di Stresa
2011
5th Hel van het Mergelland
