= Ronde van het Groene Hart =

Dutch road bicycle race (2007 - 2010)

Race details
- Date: Late March
- Region: Groene Hart, Netherlands
- English name: Tour of Groene Hart
- Local name: Ronde van het Groene Hart (in Dutch)
- Discipline: Road
- Competition: UCI Europe Tour
- Type: One-day race

History
- First edition: 2007
- Editions: 4
- Final edition: 2010
- First winner: Wouter Weylandt (BEL)
- Most wins: No repeat winner
- Final winner: Jens Mouris (NED)

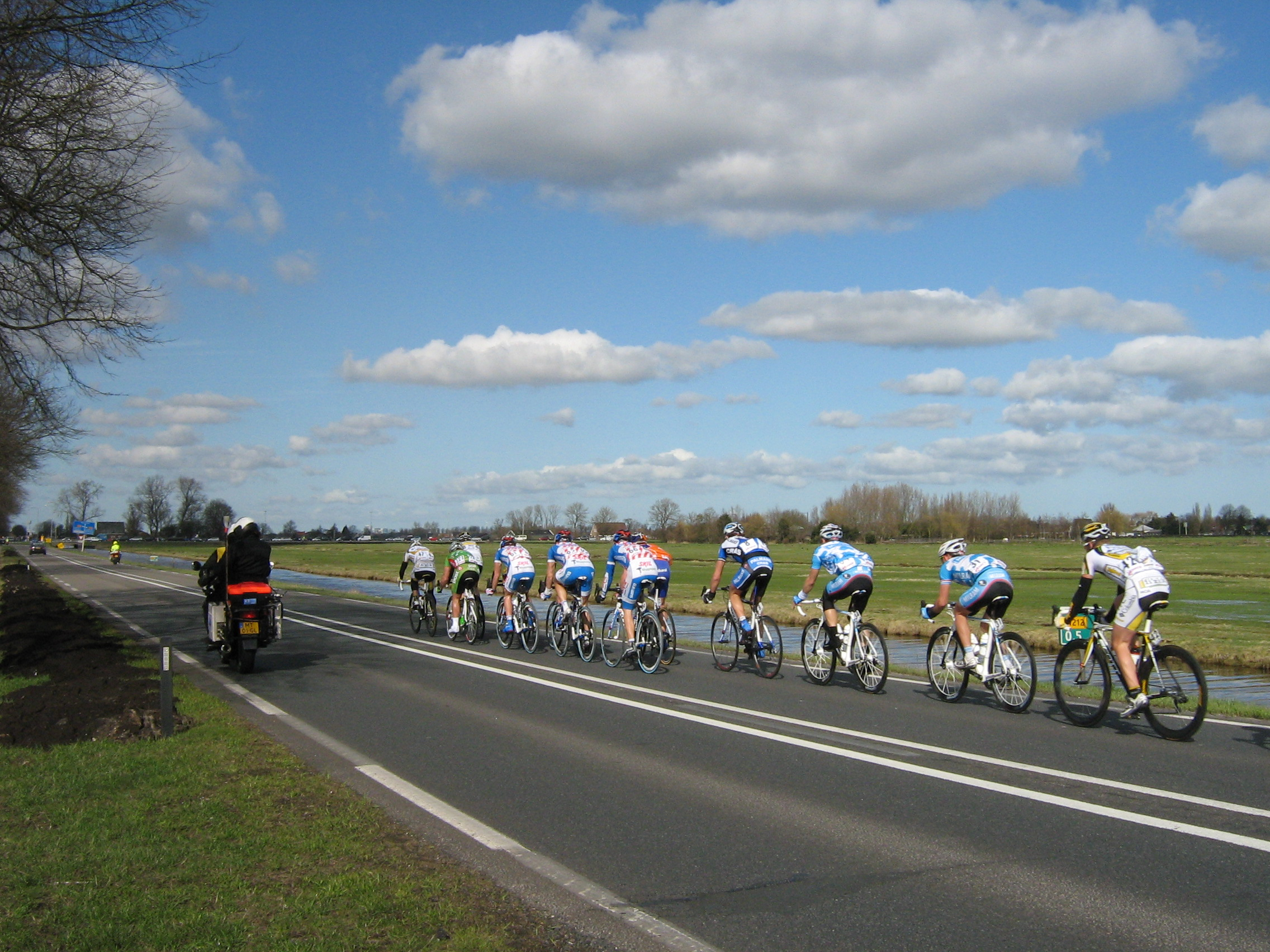
2010 edition

The Ronde van het Groene Hart was a road bicycle race held in Groene Hart, Netherlands. The first edition of the race, in 2007, was organized as a 1.1 event on the UCI Europe Tour. The 203 km race started in Leiden and finished in Woerden, passing through Rotterdam, Amsterdam and Utrecht. The last edition of the race was in 2010; no sponsors could be found for 2011 or 2012 and the race was cancelled permanently.

== Winners ==
Year	Country	Rider	Team
2007	Belgium	Wouter Weylandt	Quick Step-Innergetic
2008	Lithuania	Tomas Vaitkus	Astana
2009	Belgium	Geert Omloop	Palmans-Cras
2010	Netherlands	Jens Mouris	Vacansoleil
