= Bobbie Traksel =

Dutch cyclist (born 1981)

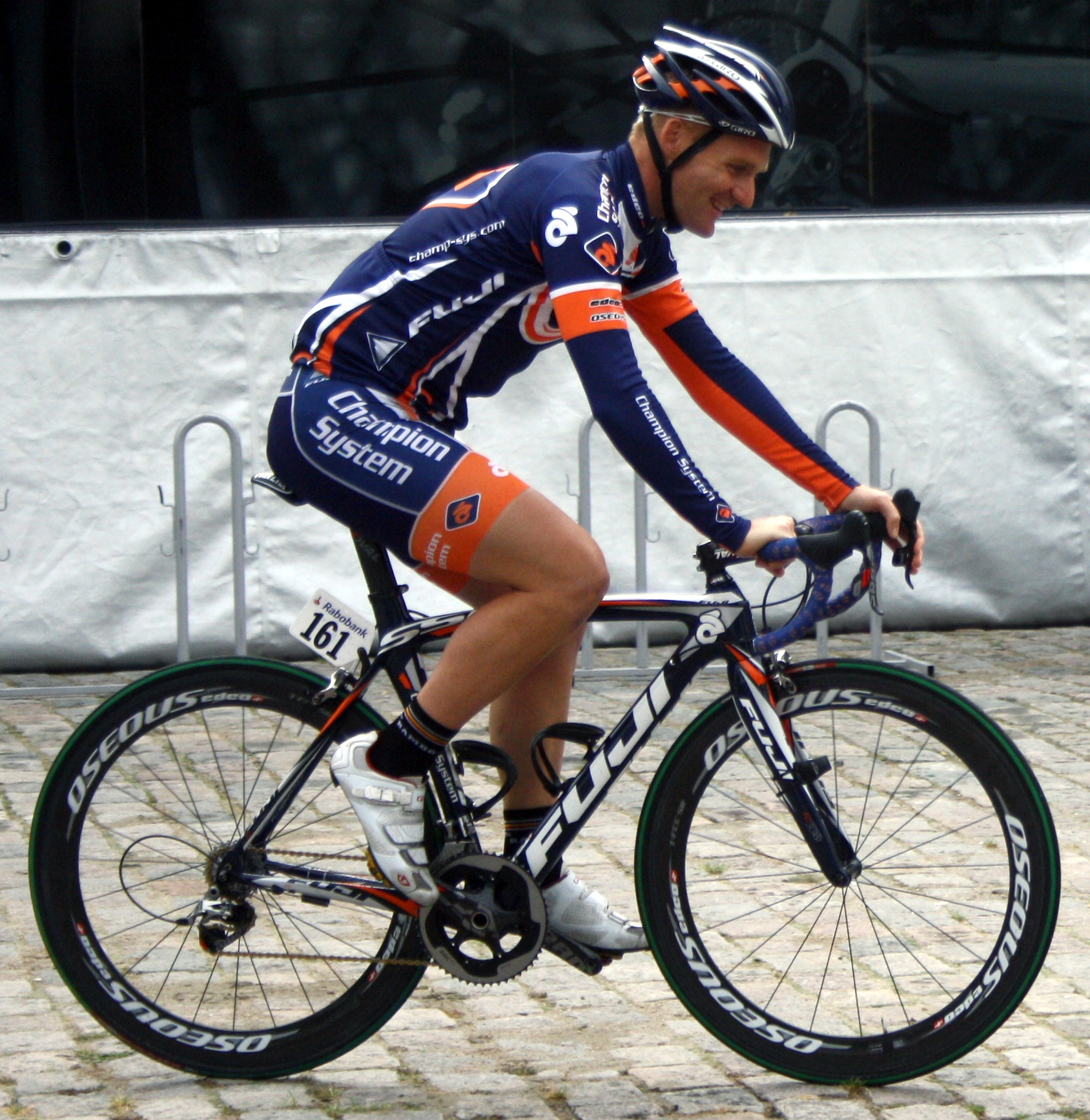
- Traksel at the 2013 World Ports Classic.

Personal information
- Full name: Bobbie Traksel
- Born: 3 November 1981 (age 44) Tiel, the Netherlands

Cycling career
- Sport: Cycling
- Disciplines: Road and track
- Role: Rider

Professional teams
- 2001–2004: Rabobank
- 2005–2006: Unibet.com
- 2007: Palmans–Collstrop
- 2008: P3 Transfer–Batavus
- 2009–2010: Vacansoleil
- 2011–2012: Landbouwkrediet
- 2013: Champion System
- 2014: An Post–Chain Reaction

Major wins
- Veenendaal–Veenendaal (2002); Driedaagse van West-Vlaanderen (2008); Kuurne–Brussels–Kuurne (2010)

Bobbie Traksel (born 3 November 1981 in Tiel) is a Dutch former professional racing cyclist. In 2000, Traksel showed considerable promise by winning the Under-23 version of the Tour of Flanders and turned professional in 2001 with Rabobank. In 2002, Traksel's surprise win at the Veenendaal–Veenendaal showed his speed and bicycle smarts. But Traksel's achievements in 2008, highlighted by winning the Driedaagse van West-Vlaanderen garnered him wider respect in the cycling community. In 2010 he won Kuurne–Brussels–Kuurne after a long breakaway. The race was heavily influenced by the weather. Many favourites retired from the race due to the cold weather, rain and wind. Traksel proved himself as a real fighter with this win.

Traksel joined An Post–Chain Reaction for the 2014 season, after his previous team – Champion System – folded at the end of the 2013 season.

== Major results ==
2000
1st PWZ Zuidenveld Tour
1st Ronde Van Vlaanderen Beloften
1st Stage 4 Tour du Loir-et-Cher
2002
1st Veenendaal–Veenendaal
1st Stage 1 Sachsen Tour
1st Stage 1 Ster Elektrotoer
2nd Dwars door Gendringen
3rd Rund um den Flughafen Köln
9th Profronde van Midden-Zeeland
2003
6th Classic Haribo
2004
1st Profronde van Fryslan
1st Noord Nederland Tour
2005
5th Overall Étoile de Bessèges
8th Châteauroux Classic
2006
1st Zwevezele
2007
2nd Overall Boucles de la Mayenne

1st Stage 1

2nd Overall OZ Wielerweekend
2nd Ronde van Noord-Holland
2nd Omloop der Kempen
3rd Omloop van het Waasland
4th Ereprijs Victor De Bruyne
2008
1st Overall Driedaagse van West-Vlaanderen

1st Stage 3

1st Ereprijs Victor De Bruyne
1st Stage 2 Vuelta a Extremadura
1st Stage 4 Olympia's Tour
2nd Omloop van het Waasland
2nd Ronde van Overijssel
3rd Ronde van het Groene Hart
4th Nokere Koerse
6th Beverbeek Classic
6th Hel van het Mergelland
7th Kuurne–Brussels–Kuurne
8th Dutch Food Valley Classic
2009
1st GP Paul Borremans
3rd Kampioenschap van Vlaanderen
5th Ronde van het Groene Hart
6th Arno Wallaard Memorial
7th Overall Delta Tour Zeeland
8th Ronde van Noord-Holland
2010
1st Kuurne–Brussels–Kuurne
3rd Overall Driedaagse van West-Vlaanderen
3rd Nokere Koerse
2011
9th Nokere Koerse
2012
1st Points classification, Étoile de Bessèges
7th Ronde van Zeeland Seaports
2013
1st Combativity classification, Tour of Oman
