= Gorik Gardeyn =

Belgian cyclist

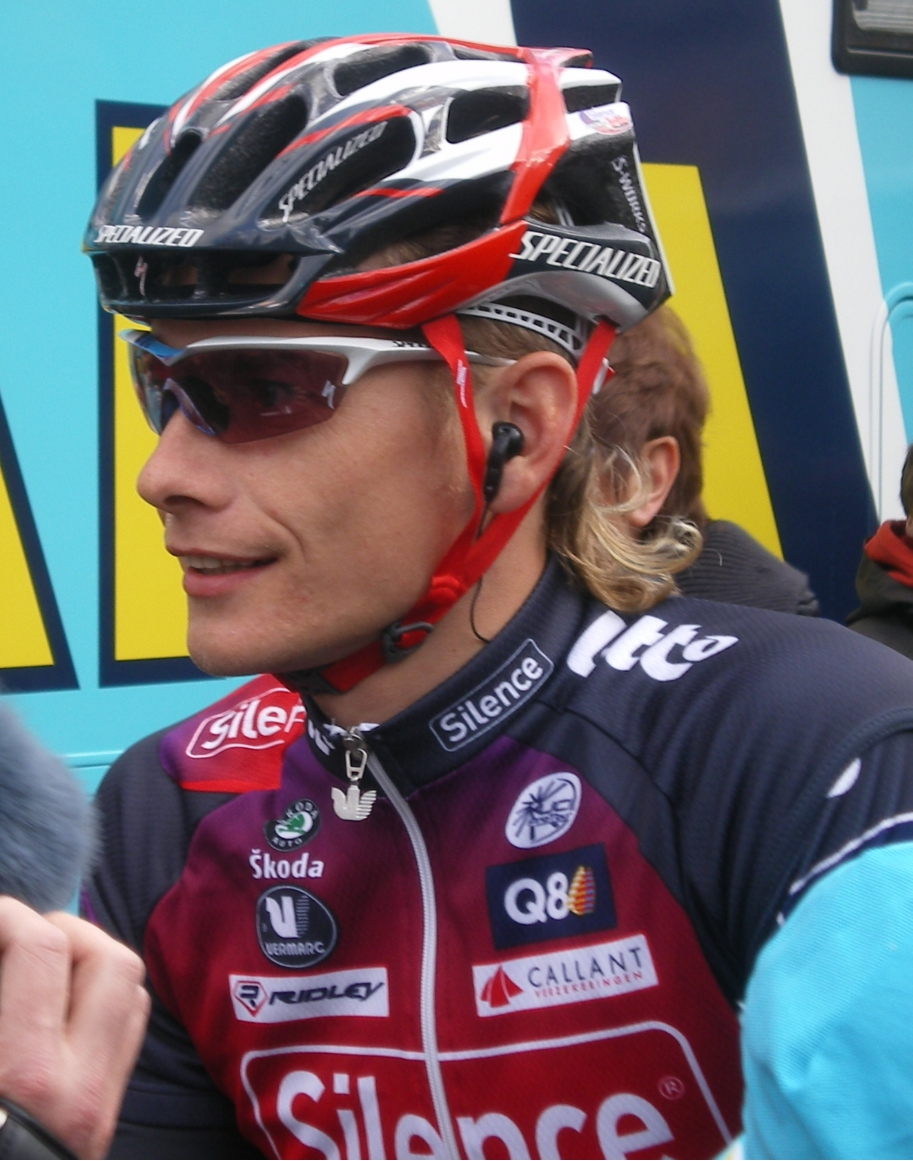
- Gardeyn in 2008

Personal information
- Full name: Gorik Gardeyn
- Born: 17 March 1980 (age 46) Tielt, Belgium

Cycling career
- Sport: Cycling
- Current team: Retired
- Discipline: Road
- Role: Rider

Amateur team
- 2000: Lotto–Adecco (stagiaire)

Professional teams
- 2001–2004: Lotto–Adecco
- 2005–2007: Unibet.com
- 2008–2009: Silence–Lotto
- 2010–2011: Vacansoleil
- 2012: Champion System
- 2013–2015: Doltcini Flanders
- 2016: Superano Ham–Isorex

Gorik Gardeyn (born 17 March 1980 in Tielt) is a Belgian former professional road racing cyclist, who raced for Unibet.com, Silence–Lotto (over two spells), Vacansoleil–DCM and Champion System, Veranclassic–Ekoi and Superano Ham–Isorex.

== Major results ==
2001
1st Stage 4 Danmark Rundt
2005
1st Classic Haribo
1st Omloop van het Waasland
2006
1st Nationale Sluitingsprijs
2nd Grote Prijs Stad Zottegem
2007
1st Stage 2 Tour of Belgium
4th Sparkassen Giro Bochum
4th Kampioenschap van Vlaanderen
5th Grand Prix de Denain
7th Omloop Het Volk
7th Omloop van het Houtland
9th Memorial Rik Van Steenbergen
10th Le Samyn
2008
6th Dwars door Vlaanderen
2010
8th Omloop van het Houtland
2011
4th Tour de Rijke
7th Grote Prijs Stad Zottegem
2013
3rd Skive–Løbet
6th Schaal Sels-Merksem
8th Ronde van Noord-Holland
8th Scandinavian Race
9th Destination Thy
2014
8th Omloop van het Waasland
2015
8th Schaal Sels
