= Michał Gołaś =

Polish road bicycle racer

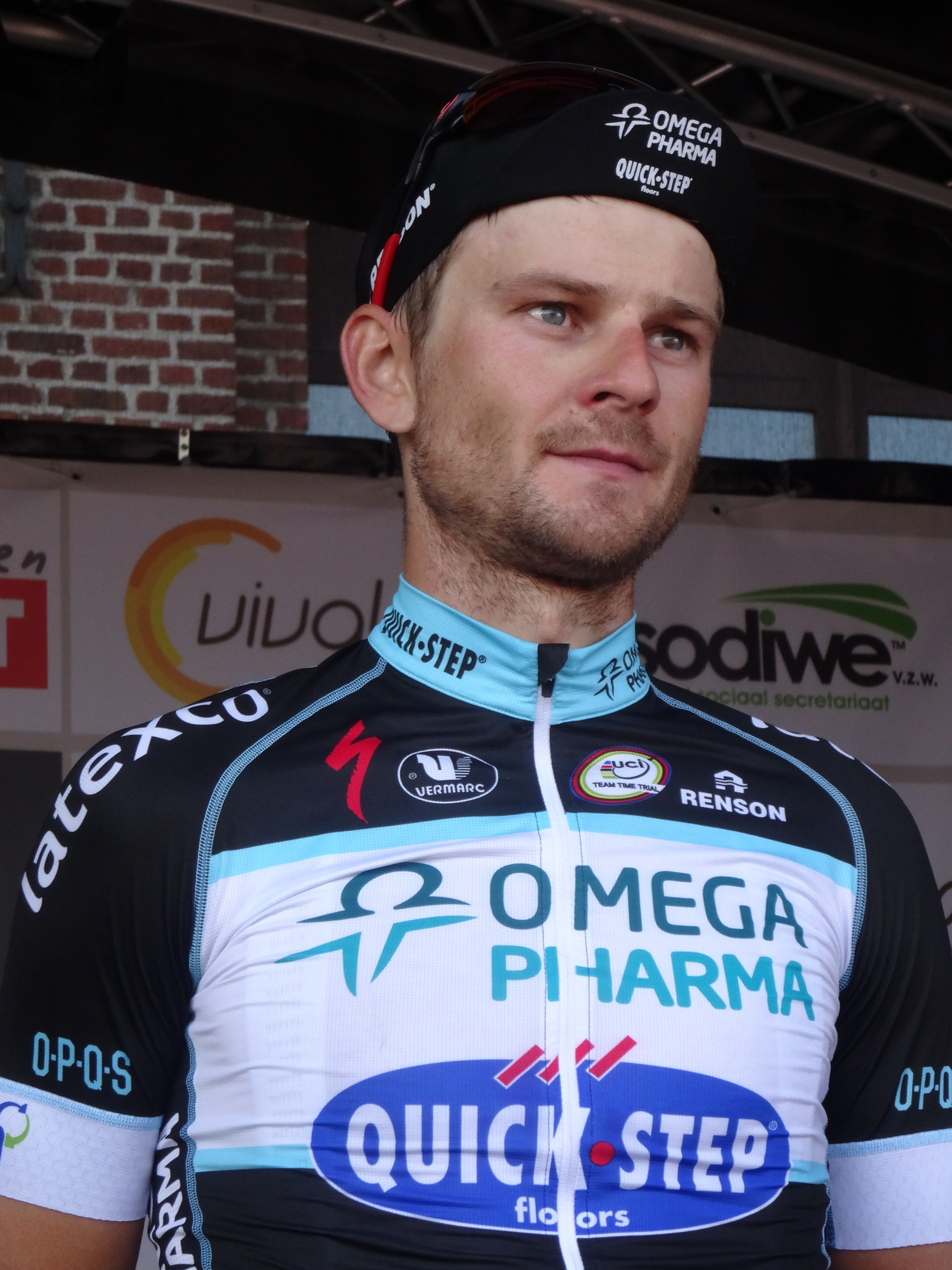
- Gołaś in 2014

Personal information
- Full name: Michał Gołaś
- Nickname: Goly
- Born: 29 April 1984 (age 42) Toruń, Poland
- Height: 1.80 m (5 ft 11 in)
- Weight: 65 kg (143 lb)

Cycling career
- Sport: Cycling
- Current team: Team Bahrain Victorious
- Discipline: Road
- Role: Rider (retired); Directeur sportif
- Rider type: Domestique

Amateur team
- 2005–2006: TKK Pacific Norda Atala Torun

Professional teams
- 2007–2008: Cycle Collstrop
- 2009: Amica Chips–Knauf
- 2009–2011: Vacansoleil
- 2012–2015: Omega Pharma–Quick-Step
- 2016–2021: Team Sky

Managerial team
- 2022–: Team Bahrain Victorious

Major wins
- Grand Tours Vuelta a España 1 TTT stage (2016) One-day races and Classics National Road Race Championships (2012)

Michał Gołaś (born 29 April 1984) is a Polish former professional road bicycle racer, who rode professionally between 2007 and 2021 for five different professional teams. Specialising as a domestique, Gołaś took two victories during his professional career – the 2012 Polish National Road Race Championships, and the 2015 Kampioenschap van Vlaanderen.

He now works as a directeur sportif for UCI WorldTeam Team Bahrain Victorious.

== Personal life ==
Gołaś is married, and has three children.

== Major results ==
2002
2nd Overall Driedaagse van Axel
2005
3rd Gran Premio Industrie del Marmo
10th Gran Premio della Liberazione
2006
1st Road race, National Under-23 Road Championships
7th Overall Giro delle Regioni
7th Gran Premio Industrie del Marmo
7th Coppa della Pace
8th Trofeo Zsšdi
9th Coppa Città di Asti
2009
4th Overall Tour of Małopolska
7th Overall Giro di Sardegna
7th Tour de Rijke
2010
1st Sprints classification, Tour of Britain
3rd Ronde van Drenthe
6th Clásica de Almería
2011
1st Mountains classification, Tour de Pologne
4th Road race, National Road Championships
4th Overall Tour de Wallonie
5th London–Surrey Cycle Classic
9th Clásica de Almería
2012
1st Road race, National Road Championships
8th Overall Tour of Turkey
Giro d'Italia

Held after Stages 12–14

2013
4th Overall Ster ZLM Toer
9th Overall Tour of Britain
2014
1st Mountains classification, Tour of Beijing
2nd Classic Sud-Ardèche
3rd Grand Prix Impanis-Van Petegem
5th Road race, National Road Championships
2015
1st Kampioenschap van Vlaanderen
2nd Road race, National Road Championships
2016
1st Stage 1 (TTT) Vuelta a España
2018
4th Road race, National Road Championships
2020
1st Mountains classification, Tour de Wallonie

=== Grand Tour general classification results timeline ===
Grand Tour	2011	2012	2013	2014	2015	2016	2017	2018	2019	2020
Giro d'Italia	DNF	93	62	—	—	—	141	—	—	—
Tour de France	—	—	—	55	95	—	—	—	—	—
Vuelta a España	DNF	—	—	—	—	118	—	—	—	DNF
