= Rob Ruijgh =

Dutch racing cyclist

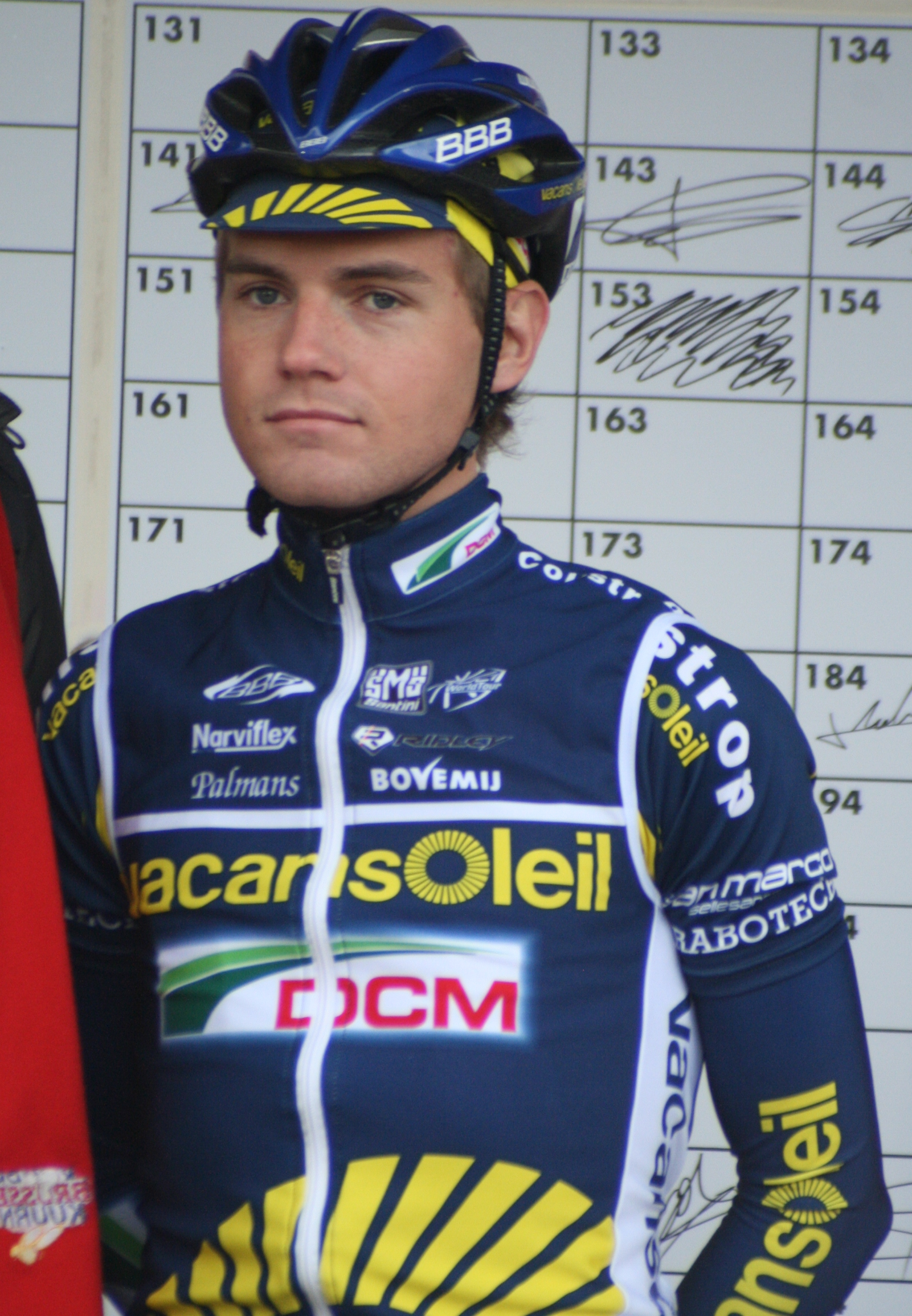
- Ruijgh at the 2011 Kuurne–Brussels–Kuurne.

Personal information
- Full name: Rob Ruijgh
- Born: 12 November 1986 (age 39) Heerlen, Netherlands
- Height: 1.72 m (5 ft 8 in)
- Weight: 64 kg (141 lb)

Cycling career
- Sport: Cycling
- Current team: Retired
- Discipline: Road
- Role: Rider

Amateur teams
- 2005: Amuzza.com
- 2009: Vacansoleil (stagiaire)

Professional teams
- 2006–2007: Rabobank Continental Team
- 2008: Team Sparkasse
- 2010–2013: Vacansoleil
- 2014–2016: Vastgoedservice–Golden Palace
- 2017–2018: Tarteletto–Isorex

Rob Ruijgh (Dutch pronunciation: [rɔp ˈrœyx]; born 12 November 1986) is a Dutch former professional racing cyclist.

== Career ==
=== Amateur career ===
Ruijgh was born in Heerlen, and liked to watch cycling on television as a youth. After visiting the local velodrome in Geleen, he started racing at the age of 9. In 1998, he became Dutch Youth Champion for 12-year-olds in Oldenzaal. With continued good results, he came into the picture of the former Dutch national coach Egon van Kessel. As he became older, van Kessel invited Ruijgh to compete against foreign opponents of his age, which are also among the best in their country. Ruijgh did not disappoint, winning the highly regarded World Cup Giro della Lunigiana in 2004. Shortly after that he also rode the Men's Junior World Championships in Verona, Italy.

In 2005, Ruijgh rode for Belgian team Amuzza.com, where former top sprinter Wilfried Nelissen was his team leader. He won one race during the season, before joining the Rabobank Continental Team in 2006. Due to a virus, he could not keep up his good results, which took him out for a few months. In 2008 Ruijgh joined the German Team Sparkasse; hestarted to perform well again and rode for the Dutch national team at under-23 level. In 2009 he continued his good results at Team BPL–Belisol, where he won Romsée–Stavelot–Romsée and the 1st stage of the Tour de Liège. Thereafter, team manager Daan Luijkx from the Vacansoleil offered him an internship in mid-2009. He finished in eleventh place at the Tour of Britain.

=== Professional career ===
After the internship in mid-2009, he became a professional with the Vacansoleil team in 2010, signing a contract until the end of 2011. He made his debut in the Tour of Qatar. After the Dutch National Road Race Championships in Beek, he broke his hand while training behind a scooter. The rest of the year he finished in the top 10 five times with a 3rd place in Binche–Tournai–Binche.

In 2011, Ruijgh had a great year; he helped team-mate Pim Ligthart win the Dutch National Road Race Championships in Ootmarsum, finishing 6th himself. He also had a strong performance in the Critérium du Dauphiné, ending 14th in the general classification. After these results Ruijgh made his debut in the Tour de France and made it to Paris. He made an excellent impression as the best Dutch cyclist, finishing 21st in the general classification – 33 minutes, 4 seconds behind winner Cadel Evans – and 5th in the young riders classification. During the Tour de France, he extended his contract with Vacansoleil–DCM until the end of the 2013 season.

In 2012 he missed the Tour de France because of a knee injury and also had to quit the Vuelta a España; tests diagnosed a parasite in his stomach. 2013 also did not start well for Ruijgh as during his favoured home race, the Amstel Gold Race, he fell and suffered a concussion. Recovery from the crash took longer than expected because of a fever after Liège–Bastogne–Liège. By the end of April his health and condition were back to normal and in May Ruijgh finished 54th overall at the Giro d'Italia.

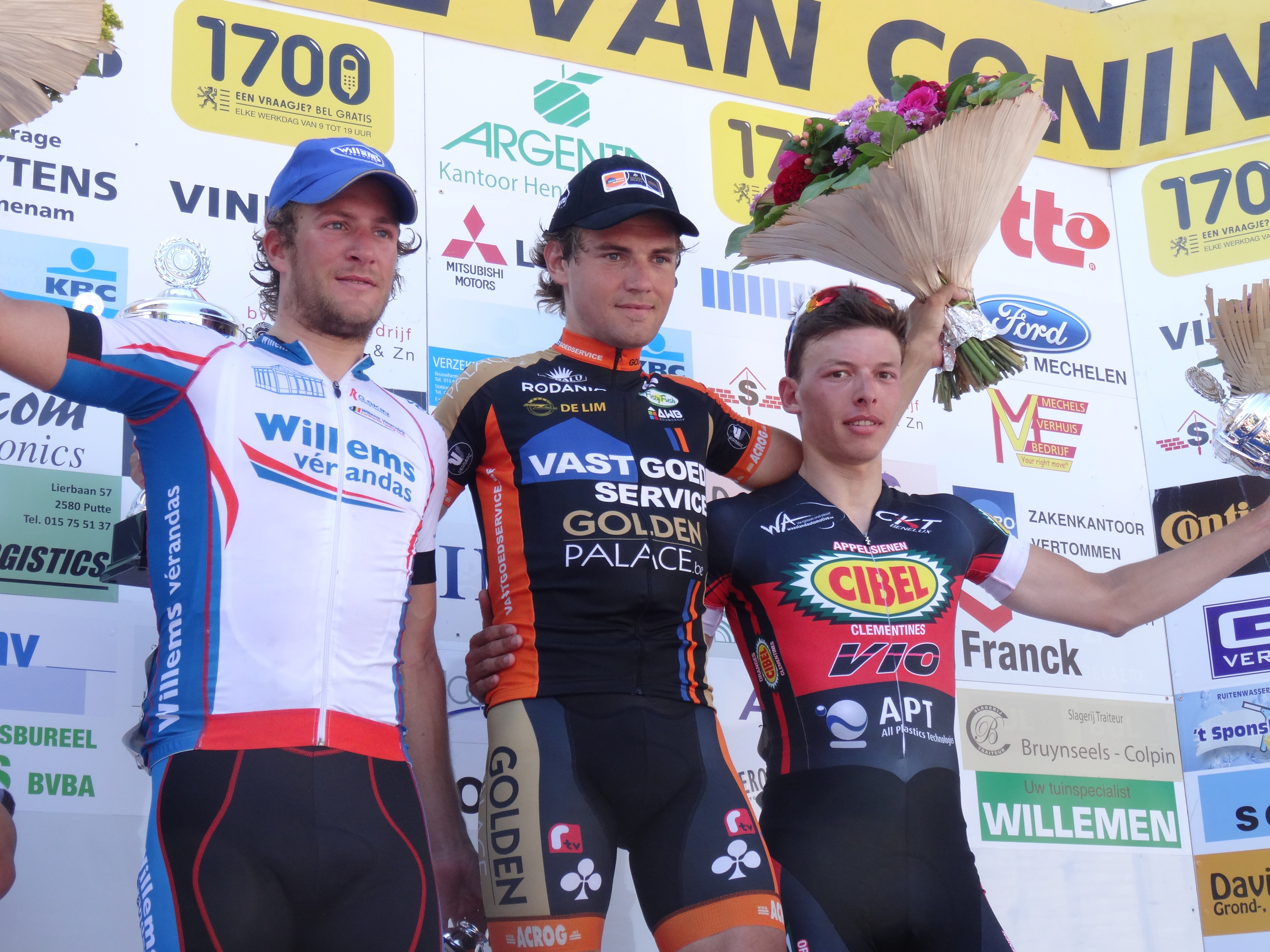
Ruijgh (centre) won the Memorial Van Coningsloo in 2014. He is joined on the podium by Nicolas Vereecken (2nd) and Oliver Naesen (3rd).

Ruijgh joined Vastgoedservice–Golden Palace for the 2014 season, after Vacansoleil–DCM folded at the end of the 2013 season.

== Major results ==
2005
1st ITT OZ Wielerweekend
3rd Overall GC OZ Wielerweekend
6th Flèche Ardennaise
2006
6th Overall Triptyque des Barrages
2008
7th Overall Tour des Pyrénées
2009
5th Druivenkoers Overijse
2010
3rd Binche–Tournai–Binche
2011
4th Overall Four Days of Dunkirk
7th Grand Prix de Plumelec-Morbihan
1st Ridderronde Maastricht
2012
1st RaboRonde Heerlen
9th Overall Four Days of Dunkirk
10th Grand Prix de Plumelec-Morbihan
2014
1st Memorial Van Coningsloo
9th Overall Three Days of De Panne
2015
9th Druivenkoers Overijse
2017
1st Overall Tour of Iran (Azerbaijan)
10th Volta Limburg Classic
