= Alberto Ongarato =

Italian cyclist (born 1975)

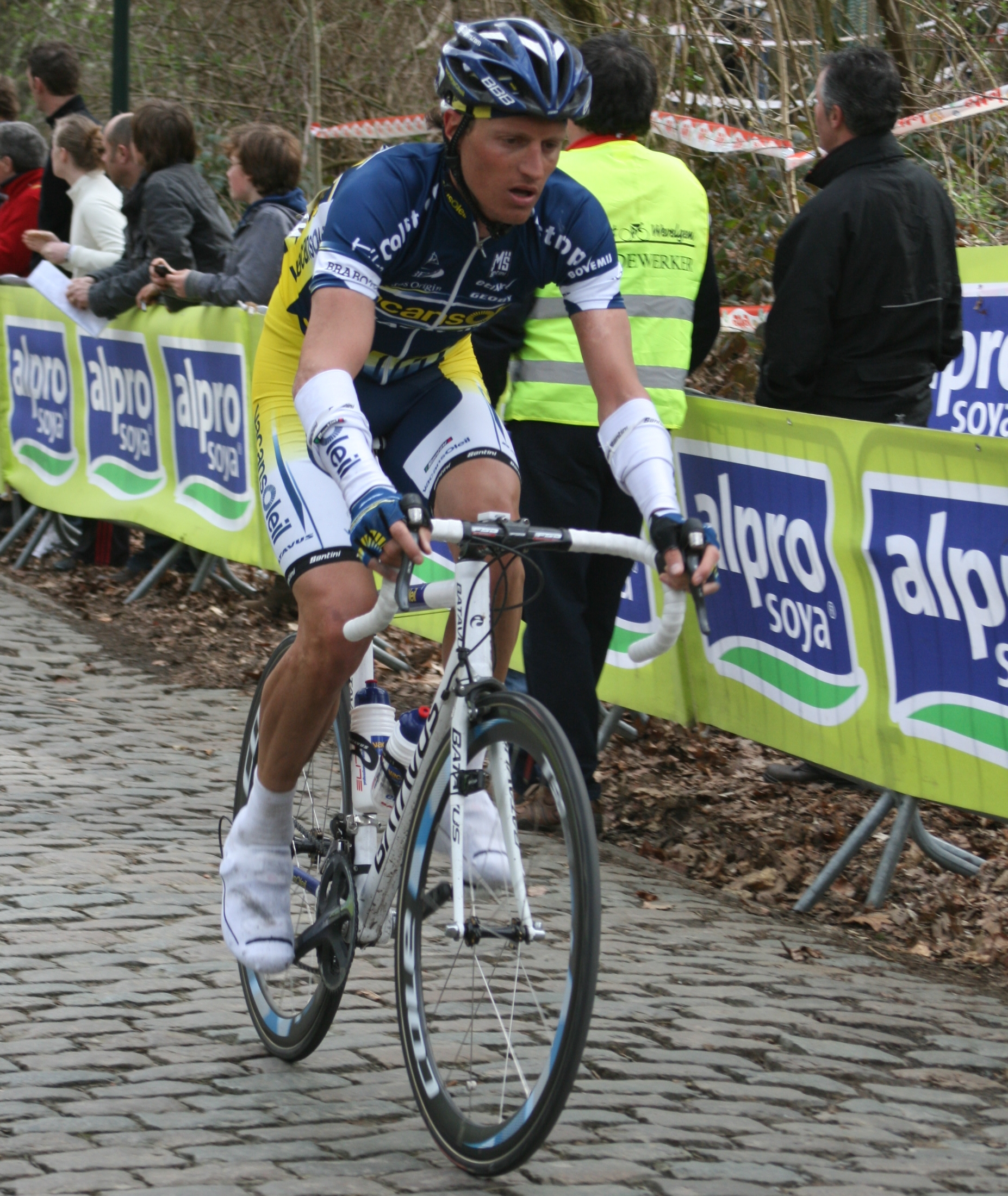

Personal information
- Full name: Alberto Ongarato
- Born: 24 July 1975 (age 51) Padua, Italy

Cycling career
- Sport: Cycling
- Discipline: Road
- Role: Rider
- Rider type: Sprinter

Professional teams
- 1998–1999: Ballan-Alessio
- 2000–2001: Mobilvetta Design–Rossin
- 2002: De Nardi
- 2003: De Nardi–Colpack
- 2004–2005: Fassa Bortolo
- 2006–2008: Team Milram
- 2009: LPR Brakes–Farnese Vini
- 2010–2011: Vacansoleil

Alberto Ongarato (born 24 July 1975 in Padua) is an Italian road racing cyclist, who rode most recently for Vacansoleil–DCM.

== Professional career ==
Ongarato signed his first professional contract in 1998 for Ballan-Alessio. For them he finished third in the Rund um den Henniger Turm in 1999. In 2000 he moved to Mobilvetta Design–Rossin and made his Giro d'Italia debut in which he finished in 90th position. A year later in 2001 he would place 115th. His next team De Nardi brought him his first professional win as he won the first stage of the Clásica Internacional de Alcobendas. In 2003 he took part in the Giro d'Italia again, but did not reach Milan as he withdrew from competition after stage 18 while cycling for De Nardi–Colpack. He made yet another switch in 2004 and placed 109th in the Giro d'Italia for Fassa Bortolo. He won stage 9 of the Volta a Portugal (2004) and in 2005 he won the second stage of the Tour de Luxembourg as well as the fifth stage of the Tour de Wallonie. In that year he took part in two giant tours, finishing 99th in the Giro d'Italia and 78th in his Vuelta a España debut. In 2006, he rode for Team Milram and did not won a race for them. He did however take part in the 2006 Giro d'Italia (130th), 2006 Vuelta a España (131st) and 2007 Giro d'Italia (withdrew after stage 9). He also made his Tour de France debut in 2007.

== Major results ==
2002
1st, Stage 1, Clásica Internacional de Alcobendas
2004
1st, Stage 9, Volta a Portugal
2005
1st, Stage 2, Tour de Luxembourg
1st, Stage 5, Tour de Wallonie
2010
1st, Ronde van Drenthe
