= Mirko Selvaggi =

Italian road bicycle racer

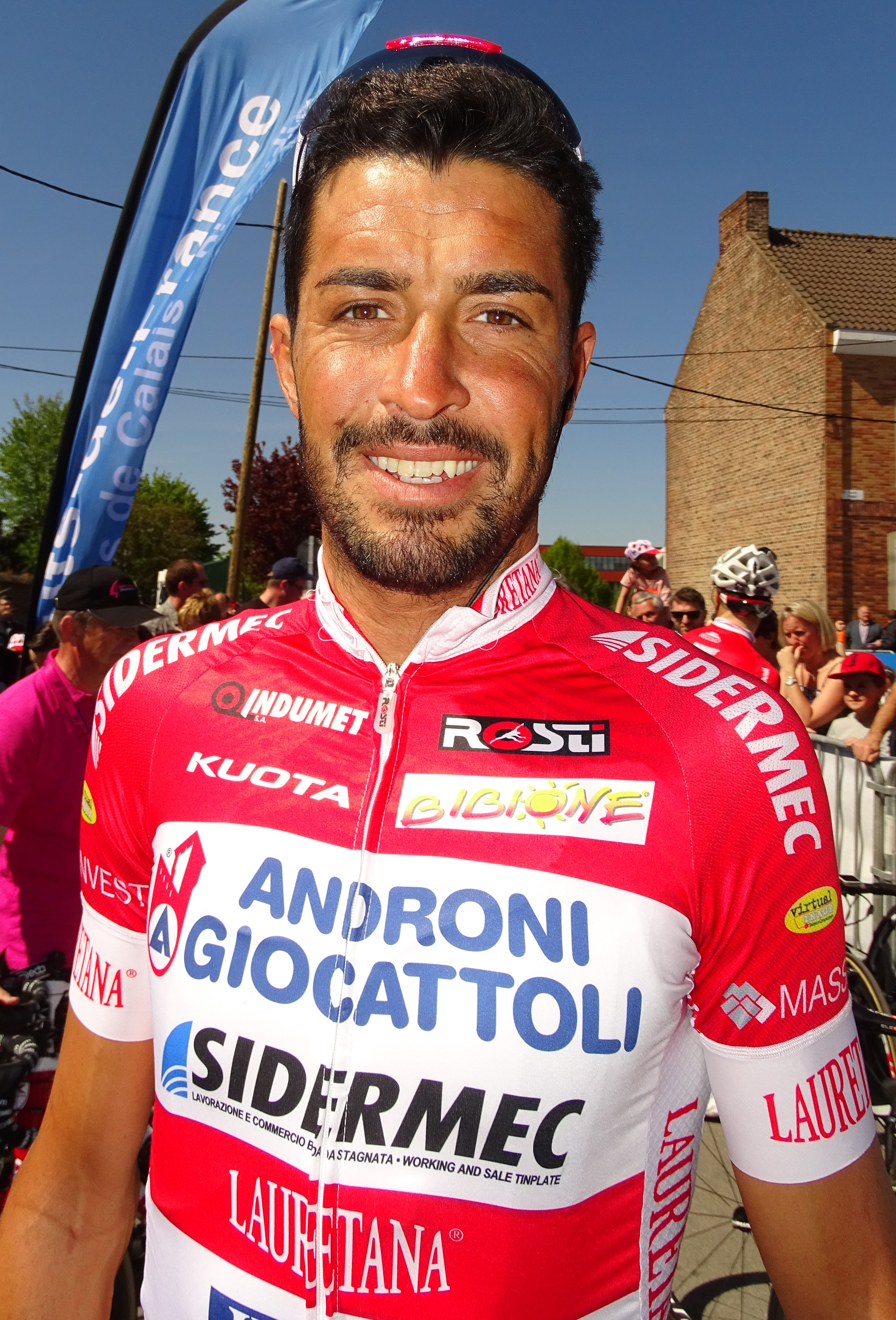
- Selvaggi at the 2016 Four Days of Dunkirk.

Personal information
- Full name: Mirko Selvaggi
- Born: 11 February 1985 (age 41) Pistoia, Italy
- Height: 1.95 m (6 ft 5 in)
- Weight: 73 kg (161 lb)

Cycling career
- Sport: Cycling
- Discipline: Road
- Role: Rider

Professional teams
- 2008: Cycle Collstrop
- 2009: Amica Chips–Knauf
- 2010: Astana
- 2011–2013: Vacansoleil–DCM
- 2014–2015: Wanty–Groupe Gobert
- 2016: Androni Giocattoli–Sidermec

Mirko Selvaggi (born 11 February 1985) is an Italian former professional road bicycle racer, who competed professionally between 2008 and 2016 for the Cycle Collstrop, Amica Chips–Knauf, Astana, Vacansoleil–DCM, Wanty–Groupe Gobert, and Androni Giocattoli–Sidermec teams.

== Biography ==
Born in Pistoia, Italy, Selvaggi turned professional with the UCI Professional Continental team Cycle Collstrop in 2008 after winning stage 2 in the Giro di Toscana. In 2009, he moved to Amica Chips–Knauf but the team was disbanded at the end of 2009. Selvaggi was then recruited by UCI ProTeam Astana recruited Selvaggi for his experience in spring classics.

Selvaggi joined Wanty–Groupe Gobert for the 2014 season, after his previous team – Vacansoleil–DCM – folded at the end of the 2013 season.

== Major results ==
2006
6th Ruota d'Oro
2007
1st Trofeo Tempestini Ledo
2nd Gran Premio di Poggiana
3rd Overall Giro di Toscana

1st Stage 2

7th Trofeo Franco Balestra
2012
2nd Classic Loire Atlantique
9th Tour du Finistère
2013
4th Dwars door Vlaanderen
2014
8th Coppa Bernocchi
2015
6th Overall Tour of Turkey
2016
10th Overall Four Days of Dunkirk
