= Frederik Veuchelen =

Belgian racing cyclist

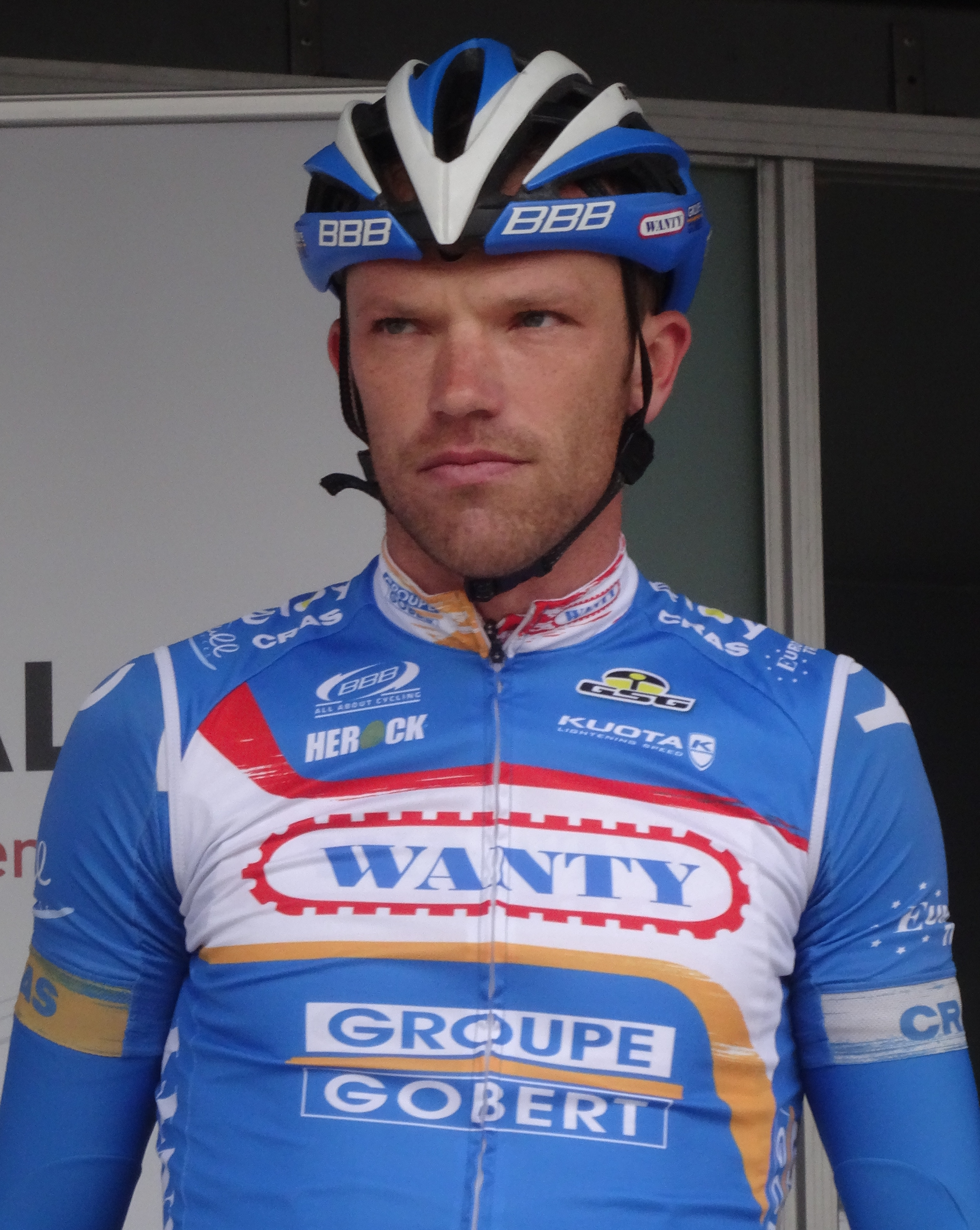
- Veuchelen at the 2014 Omloop van het Houtland.

Personal information
- Full name: Frederik Veuchelen
- Born: 4 September 1978 (age 48) Korbeek-Lo, Belgium
- Height: 1.83 m (6 ft 0 in)
- Weight: 75 kg (165 lb)

Cycling career
- Sport: Cycling
- Current team: Retired
- Discipline: Road
- Role: Rider

Amateur team
- 2003: Think Media Cycling

Professional teams
- 2004–2008: Vlaanderen–T Interim
- 2009–2013: Vacansoleil
- 2014–2017: Wanty–Groupe Gobert

Major wins
- Dwars door Vlaanderen (2006)

Frederik Veuchelen (born 4 September 1978 in Korbeek-Lo) is a Belgian former professional road bicycle racer, who competed professionally between 2004 and 2017 for the Topsport Vlaanderen, Vacansoleil–DCM, and Wanty–Groupe Gobert teams.

== Major results ==
2003
1st Memorial Van Coningsloo
8th Internationale Wielertrofee Jong Maar Moedig
2005
6th Overall Tour of Britain
7th Overall Rheinland-Pfalz Rundfahrt
2006
1st Dwars door Vlaanderen
4th Halle–Ingooigem
2007
3rd Grote Prijs Gerrie Knetemann
10th Grand Prix de Fourmies
2008
2nd Grand Prix d'Ouverture La Marseillaise
6th Overall Étoile de Bessèges
8th Overall Tour of Britain
10th Overall Circuit de Lorraine
10th Sparkassen Giro Bochum
2009
6th Druivenkoers Overijse
2010
3rd Road race, National Road Championships
8th Druivenkoers Overijse
2011
8th Halle–Ingooigem
2012
1st Mountains classification Paris–Nice
6th Overall Étoile de Bessèges
2013
2nd Tour du Finistère
2014
7th Cholet-Pays de Loire
9th Overall Étoile de Bessèges
9th Grote Prijs Stad Zottegem
2015
1st Mountains classification Bayern Rundfahrt
2017
8th GP Paul Borremans Viane-Geraardsbergen
