= Björn Leukemans =

Belgian road bicycle racer (born 1977)

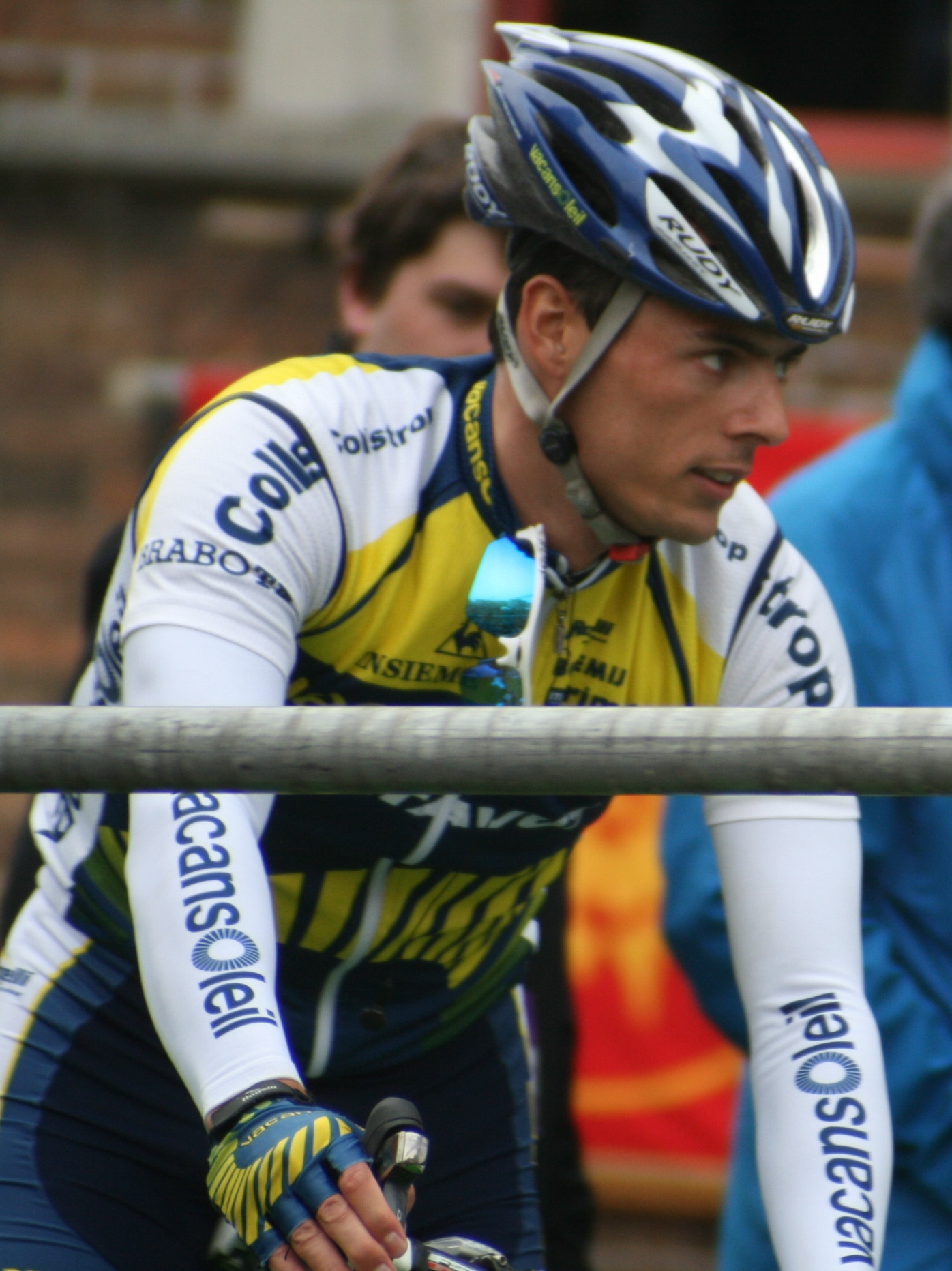
- Leukemans at the 2009 Tour of Flanders.

Personal information
- Full name: Björn Leukemans
- Born: 1 July 1977 (age 49) Deurne, Belgium
- Height: 1.77 m (5 ft 10 in)
- Weight: 66 kg (146 lb)

Cycling career
- Sport: Cycling
- Current team: Retired
- Discipline: Road
- Role: Rider
- Rider type: Classics specialist

Professional teams
- 2000–2001: Vlaanderen
- 2002–2004: Palmans
- 2005–2007: Davitamon–Lotto
- 2009–2013: Vacansoleil
- 2014–2015: Wanty–Groupe Gobert

Major wins
- Stage Races Tour du Limousin (2011)

Björn Leukemans (born 1 July 1977 in Deurne) is a Belgian former professional road bicycle racer. During 2008, Leukemans was suspended for doping with artificial testosterone. In 2009, he joined the Vacansoleil team. Leukemans joined Wanty–Groupe Gobert for the 2014 season, after his previous team – Vacansoleil–DCM – folded at the end of the 2013 season. Leukemans retired in 2015.

== Major results ==
1999
1st Stage 2 Vuelta a Navarra
2nd Road race, National Under-23 Road Championships
3rd Circuit de Wallonie
3rd Zesbergenprijs Harelbeke
5th Hasselt–Spa–Hasselt
6th Road race, UCI Under-23 Road World Championships
7th Zellik–Galmaarden
9th Overall Le Triptyque des Monts et Châteaux
9th Flèche Namuroise
2000
1st Stage 2 Dekra Open Stuttgart
2nd Overall Tour de la Région Wallonne
6th Druivenkoers Overijse
8th Grand Prix d'Isbergues
2001
2nd Grote Prijs Jef Scherens
3rd GP Stad Vilvoorde
5th Zellik–Galmaarden
7th Schaal Sels
8th Grand Prix d'Isbergues
9th Scheldeprijs
9th Cras Avernas
2002
1st Grote Prijs Beeckman-De Caluwé
4th Overall Tour de la Région Wallonne
5th Overall Course de la Solidarité Olympique

1st Stage 3

5th Cholet-Pays de Loire
5th Veenendaal–Veenendaal Classic
6th Druivenkoers Overijse
2003
4th Ronde van Drenthe
5th Brussels–Ingooigem
10th Classic Haribo
2004
1st Stage 5 Tour of Belgium
3rd Grote Prijs Stad Zottegem
4th Rund um Köln
4th Polynormande
5th Clásica de Almería
6th Rund um den Henninger Turm
9th Route Adélie
2005
2nd Grote Prijs Jef Scherens
2nd Grand Prix de Wallonie
7th Amstel Gold Race
2006
5th Grand Prix d'Ouverture La Marseillaise
5th Rund um den Henninger Turm
6th Giro del Piemonte
2007
1st Stage 4 Tour of Austria
4th Paris–Roubaix
4th Druivenkoers Overijse
7th Brabantse Pijl
9th Halle–Ingooigem
10th Rund um die Hainleite
10th Grand Prix de Wallonie
2009
3rd Le Samyn
4th Brabantse Pijl
6th Halle–Ingooigem
7th Overall Étoile de Bessèges

1st Stage 4

8th Tour of Flanders
10th Overall Tour du Limousin
2010
1st Druivenkoers Overijse
2nd Dwars door Vlaanderen
4th Tour of Flanders
4th Grote Prijs Jef Scherens
6th Overall Tour de Luxembourg
6th Paris–Roubaix
6th Grand Prix de Wallonie
7th Overall Ster Elektrotoer
7th E3 Prijs Vlaanderen
7th Brabantse Pijl
2011
1st Overall Tour du Limousin

1st Stage 1

1st Druivenkoers Overijse
2nd Brabantse Pijl
3rd Overall Tour of Belgium
3rd Grand Prix de Wallonie
6th Grand Prix Cycliste de Québec
7th Tour of Flanders
7th Amstel Gold Race
9th Overall Tour de Luxembourg
9th Liège–Bastogne–Liège
2012
1st Druivenkoers Overijse
1st Stadsprijs Geraardsbergen
3rd Grand Prix de Wallonie
4th Grote Prijs Jef Scherens
6th Grand Prix Cycliste de Montréal
7th Paris–Bourges
7th Paris–Tours
8th Overall Circuit de Lorraine
2013
1st Druivenkoers Overijse
2nd Binche–Chimay–Binche
3rd Brabantse Pijl
5th Heistse Pijl
6th Grand Prix Impanis-Van Petegem
7th Amstel Gold Race
9th Grand Prix d'Ouverture La Marseillaise
10th Grand Prix of Aargau Canton
2014
2nd Overall Tour du Limousin

1st Stage 1

4th Druivenkoers Overijse
5th Brabantse Pijl
6th Overall Tour de Picardie
9th Tour of Flanders
9th Brussels Cycling Classic
9th Grand Prix Impanis-Van Petegem
10th Overall Tour de Luxembourg
2015
1st Ronde van Limburg
1st Grote Prijs Jef Scherens
1st Stadsprijs Geraardsbergen
