= Druivenkoers Overijse =

Belgian one-day road cycling race

Race details
- Date: Late August
- Region: Overijse, Belgium
- English name: Druivenkoers Overijse
- Local name(s): Druivenkoers Overijse (in Dutch)
- Discipline: Road race
- Competition: UCI Europe Tour
- Type: Single-day
- Web site: www.desportvriendenoverijse.be

History
- First edition: 1961
- Editions: 64 (as of 2024)
- First winner: Ludo Janssens (BEL)
- Most wins: Roger De Vlaeminck (BEL); Björn Leukemans (BEL) (4 wins)
- Most recent: Jelte Krijnsen (NED)

Druivenkoers Overijse is a single-day road bicycle race held annually in August in Overijse, Belgium. Since 2005, the race is organized as a 1.1 event on the UCI Europe Tour.

The record of victories (4) belongs to Roger De Vlaeminck and Björn Leukemans.

== Winners ==
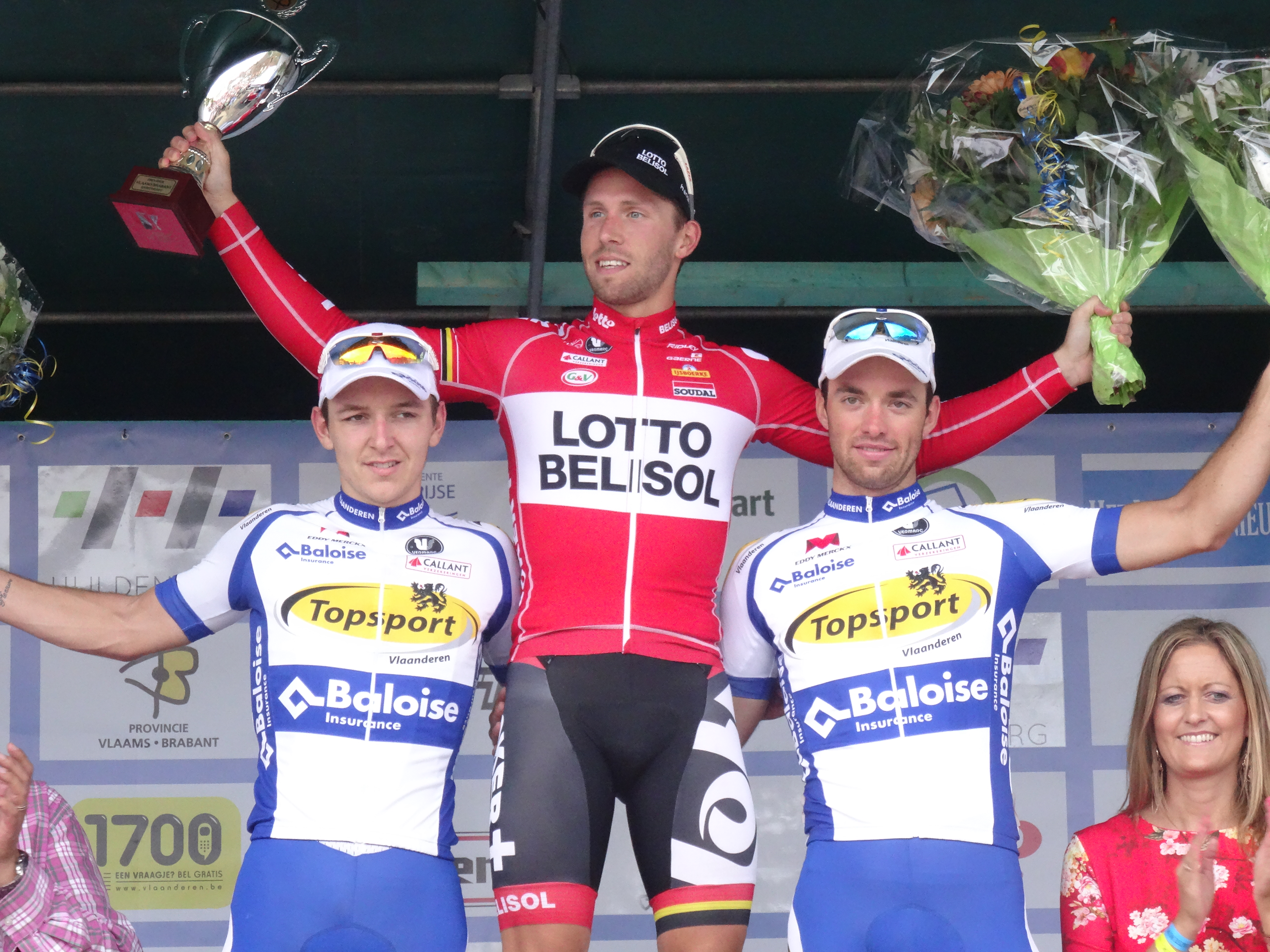
2014: Jasper De Buyst (2), Jonas van Genechten (1) & Tom Van Asbroeck (3).

Year	Country	Rider	Team
1961	Belgium	Ludo Janssens	Solo–Van Steenbergen
1962	Belgium	Jos Dewit	Pelforth–Sauvage–Lejeune
1963	Belgium	Henri De Wolf	Solo–Van Steenbergen
1964	Belgium	Willy Van den Eynde	Wiel's–Groene Leeuw
1965	Belgium	Joseph Spruyt	Mercier–BP–Hutchinson
1966	Belgium	Eddy Merckx	Peugeot–BP–Michelin
1967	Belgium	Alfons De Bal	Okay Whisky–Diamant–De Torrens
1968	Netherlands	John Schepers	Caballero–Wielersport
1969	Belgium	Tony Houbrechts	Flandria–De Clerck–Krüger
1970	Belgium	Roger De Vlaeminck	Flandria–Mars
1971	Belgium	Georges Pintens	Hertekamp–Magniflex
1972	Belgium	Roger De Vlaeminck	Dreher
1973	Belgium	Roger Swerts	Molteni
1974	Belgium	Roger De Vlaeminck	Brooklyn
1975	Belgium	Eddy Merckx	Molteni–RYC
1976	Belgium	Joseph Bruyère	Molteni–Campagnolo
1977	Belgium	Frans Verbeeck	IJsboerke–Colnago
1978	Belgium	Roger De Vlaeminck	Sanson
1979	Belgium	Ludo Peeters	IJsboerke–Warncke Eis
1980	Belgium	Alfons De Wolf	Boule d'Or
1981	Belgium	Rudy Pevenage	Capri Sonne
1982	Belgium	Guido Van Calster	Del Tongo–Colnago
1983	Italy	Walter Dalgal	Safir–Van de Ven
1984	Belgium	Jean-Marie Wampers	Splendor–Mondial Moquettes
1985	Belgium	Rudy Dhaenens	Hitachi–Splendor
1986	Belgium	Marc Somers	Joker–Emerxil–Merckx
1987	Netherlands	Adri van der Poel	PDM–Ultima–Concorde
1988	Belgium	Marc Sergeant	Hitachi–Bosal
1989	Belgium	Carlo Bomans	Domex–Weinmann
1990	Belgium	Dirk De Wolf	PDM–Concorde–Ultima
1991	Belgium	Ronny Van Holen	Tulip Computers
1992	Russia	Viatcheslav Ekimov	Panasonic–Sportlife
1993	Belgium	Herman Frison	Lotto
1994	Belgium	Johan Museeuw	GB–MG Maglificio
1995	Belgium	Johan Museeuw	Mapei–GB–Latexco
1996	Netherlands	Erik Breukink	Rabobank
1997	Belgium	Andrei Tchmil	Lotto–Mobistar–Isoglass
1998	Russia	Sergei Ivanov	TVM–Farm Frites
1999	Russia	Sergei Ivanov	TVM–Farm Frites
2000	Belgium	Michel Vanhaecke	Tönissteiner–Colnago
2001	Belgium	Serge Baguet	Lotto–Adecco
2002	Belgium	Christophe Brandt	Lotto–Adecco
2003	Netherlands	Matthé Pronk	BankGiroLoterij
2004	Germany	Stefan Schumacher	Team Lamonta
2005	Colombia	Leonardo Duque	Jartazi–Revor
2006	Great Britain	Russell Downing	DFL–Cyclingnews–Litespeed
2007	Belgium	Roy Sentjens	Predictor–Lotto
2008	Germany	Dominic Klemme	Team 3C Gruppe
2009	Latvia	Aleksejs Saramotins	Team Designa Køkken
2010	Belgium	Björn Leukemans	Vacansoleil
2011	Belgium	Björn Leukemans	Vacansoleil–DCM
2012	Belgium	Björn Leukemans	Vacansoleil–DCM
2013	Belgium	Björn Leukemans	Vacansoleil–DCM
2014	Belgium	Jonas Vangenechten	Lotto–Belisol
2015	Belgium	Jérôme Baugnies	Wanty–Groupe Gobert
2016	Belgium	Jérôme Baugnies	Wanty–Groupe Gobert
2017	Belgium	Jérôme Baugnies	Wanty–Groupe Gobert
2018	Belgium	Xandro Meurisse	Wanty–Groupe Gobert
2019	Netherlands	Arvid de Kleijn	Metec–TKH
2020	France	Florian Sénéchal	Deceuninck–Quick-Step
2021	Belgium	Remco Evenepoel	Deceuninck–Quick-Step
2022	France	Matis Louvel	Arkéa–Samsic
2023	Belgium	Victor Campenaerts	Lotto–Dstny
2024	Netherlands	Jelte Krijnsen	Q36.5 Pro Cycling Team
