= Vacansoleil–DCM =

Cycling team

Vacansoleil-DCM Pro Cycling Team

Team information
- UCI code: VCD
- Registered: Netherlands
- Founded: 2005
- Disbanded: 2013
- Discipline: Road
- Status: UCI ProTeam
- Bicycles: Bianchi
- Website: Team home page

Key personnel
- General manager: Daan Luijkx
- Team managers: Michel Cornelisse, Hilaire Van Der Schueren

Team name history
- 2005 2006 2007 2008 2009–2010 2011–2013: Fondas Imabo–Doorisol; P3Transfer–Doorisol; P3Transfer–Fondas; P3 Transfer–Batavus; Vacansoleil; Vacansoleil-DCM
Vacansoleil–DCM jersey
Jersey

Vacansoleil–DCM Pro Cycling Team was a Dutch professional road race cycling team. They were a UCI ProTeam and competed in the UCI World Tour. The team was established in 2005, as the successor of P3 Transfer-Batavus, while also taking over many of the riders and staff of Cycle Collstrop, the former team of manager Van der Schueren. Neither Vacansoleil or DCM renewed their sponsorship of the program after the 2013 season.

== History ==
The team made their debut on the road in 2009. The team's title sponsor Vacansoleil is a European company which organizes luxury camping holidays. DCM is a manufacturer of soil fertility products. Following the loss of Vacansoleil as a sponsor, it was decided to close down the team. However Hilaire van der Schueren announced the creation of a new team at the UCI Professional Continental level with sponsorship from Wanty for the 2014 season.

== Final team roster (2013) ==
As of 31 December 2013.

Rider	Date of birth
Kris Boeckmans (BEL)	13 February 1987 (aged 26)
Grega Bole (SLO)	13 August 1985 (aged 28)
Thomas De Gendt (BEL)	6 November 1986 (aged 27)
Romain Feillu (FRA)	16 April 1984 (aged 29)
Juan Antonio Flecha (ESP)	17 September 1977 (aged 36)
Johnny Hoogerland (NED)	13 May 1983 (aged 30)
Martijn Keizer (NED)	25 March 1988 (aged 25)
Wesley Kreder (NED)	4 November 1990 (aged 23)
Sergey Lagutin (UZB)	14 January 1981 (aged 32)
Maurits Lammertink (NED)	31 August 1990 (aged 23)
Björn Leukemans (BEL)	1 July 1977 (aged 36)
Pim Ligthart (NED)	16 June 1988 (aged 25)
Bert-Jan Lindeman (NED)	16 June 1989 (aged 24)
Marco Marcato (ITA)	11 February 1984 (aged 29)

Rider	Date of birth
Tomasz Marczyński (POL)	6 March 1984 (aged 29)
Barry Markus (NED)	17 July 1991 (aged 22)
Wouter Mol (NED)	17 April 1982 (aged 31)
Nikita Novikov (RUS)	10 November 1989 (aged 24)
Rob Ruijgh (NED)	12 November 1986 (aged 27)
José Rujano (Note: Rujano left the team on 24 June, later announcing his retirement from cycling.) (VEN)	18 February 1982 (aged 31)
Mirko Selvaggi (ITA)	11 February 1985 (aged 28)
Rafael Valls (ESP)	25 June 1987 (aged 26)
Kenny van Hummel (NED)	30 September 1982 (aged 31)
Boy van Poppel (NED)	18 January 1988 (aged 25)
Danny van Poppel (NED)	26 July 1993 (aged 20)
Frederik Veuchelen (BEL)	4 September 1978 (aged 35)
Willem Wauters (BEL)	10 November 1989 (aged 24)
Lieuwe Westra (NED)	11 September 1982 (aged 31)

== Major wins ==
2009
Stage 4 Étoile de Bessèges, Bjorn Leukemans
Overall Driedaagse van West-Vlaanderen, Johnny Hoogerland

Stage 1, Johnny Hoogerland

Arno Wallaard Memorial, Lieuwe Westra
Overall Tour de Picardie, Lieuwe Westra

Stage 1, Lieuwe Westra

Overall Circuit de Lorraine, Matteo Carrara
Stages 2 & 3 Tour of Belgium, Borut Božič
Uzbekistan Road Race Championships, Sergey Lagutin
Stage 1 Tour de Pologne, Borut Božič
Stage 1 Tour du Limousin, Borut Božič
Stage 6 Vuelta a España, Borut Božič
3rd Paris–Tours, Borut Božič

2010
Stages 1 & 2 Étoile de Bessèges, Borut Božič
Overall Tour of Qatar, Wouter Mol
Kuurne–Brussels–Kuurne, Bobbie Traksel
Ronde van het Groene Hart, Jens Mouris
Ronde van Drenthe, Alberto Ongarato
Overall Tour de Luxembourg, Matteo Carrara
Uzbekistan Road Race Championships, Sergey Lagutin
Stage 4 Vuelta a Burgos, Romain Feillu
Stage 2 Tour de l'Ain, Romain Feillu
Stage 4 Tour de l'Ain, Wout Poels
Druivenkoers Overijse, Björn Leukemans
Grand Prix de Fourmies, Romain Feillu
Stage 4 Tour of Britain, Wout Poels
Stage 7 Tour of Britain, Borut Božič
Münsterland Giro, Joost van Leijen
Coppa Sabatini, Riccardo Riccò

2011
Stage 2, 3 & 4 Tour Méditerranéen, Romain Feillu
Stage 1 Paris–Nice, Thomas De Gendt
Classic Loire Atlantique, Lieuwe Westra
Hel van het Mergelland, Pim Ligthart
Tour du Finistère, Romain Feillu
Overall Tour de Picardie, Romain Feillu

Stage 2, Romain Feillu

Stage 3 Circuit de Lorraine, Thomas De Gendt
Stage 5 Circuit de Lorraine, Romain Feillu
Prologue Tour of Belgium, Lieuwe Westra
Boucles de l'Aulne, Martijn Keizer
Stage 4 Tour de Luxembourg, Romain Feillu
Stage 5 Tour de Suisse, Romain Feillu
Stage 7 Tour de Suisse, Thomas De Gendt
Uzbekistan Road Race Championships, Sergey Lagutin
Netherlands Road Race Championships, Pim Ligthart
Stage 2 Tour de Wallonie, Joost van Leijen
Stage 3 Tour de l'Ain, Wouter Poels
Overall Tour du Limousin, Björn Leukemans

Stage 1, Björn Leukemans

Druivenkoers Overijse, Björn Leukemans
Tour de Vendée, Marco Marcato

2012
Uzbekistan Road Race Championships, Sergey Lagutin
Netherlands Time Trial Championships, Lieuwe Westra
Sweden Time Trial Championships, Gustav Larsson
Stage 4 Étoile de Bessèges, Marco Marcato
Stage 1 Paris–Nice, Gustav Larsson
Stage 5 Paris–Nice, Lieuwe Westra
Stage 7 Paris–Nice, Thomas De Gendt
Ronde van Drenthe, Bert-Jan Lindeman
Stage 2 Tour de Picardie, Kenny van Hummel
Stage 20 Giro d'Italia, Thomas De Gendt
Stage 3 Tour de Luxembourg, Wout Poels
Grand Prix of Aargau Canton, Sergey Lagutin
Druivenkoers Overijse, Björn Leukemans
Overall Danmark Rundt, Lieuwe Westra

Stage 5 (ITT), Lieuwe Westra

Paris–Tours, Marco Marcato
Tour de Vendée, Wesley Kreder

2013
Stage 7 Volta a Catalunya, Thomas De Gendt
Stage 1 Tour of California, Lieuwe Westra
Stage 5 Ster ZLM Toer, Pim Ligthart
Netherlands National Time Trial Championships, Lieuwe Westra
Venezuela National Time Trial Championships, José Rujano
Netherlands National Road Race Championships, Johnny Hoogerland
Stage 1 Arctic Race of Norway, Kenny van Hummel
Stage 2 Tour de l'Ain, Grega Bole
Stage 4 Tour de l'Ain, Wout Poels
Druivenkoers Overijse, Björn Leukemans
Amstel Curaçao Race, Johnny Hoogerland

== National champions ==
2009
Uzbekistan Road Race Sergey Lagutin
2010
Uzbekistan Road Race Sergey Lagutin
2011
Dutch Road Race Pim Ligthart
Uzbekistan Road Race Sergey Lagutin
2012
Uzbekistan Road Race Sergey Lagutin
Dutch Time Trial Lieuwe Westra
Swedish Time Trial Gustav Larsson
2013
Dutch Time Trial Lieuwe Westra
Venezuelan Time Trial José Rujano
Dutch Road Race Johnny Hoogerland
