= Grote Prijs Stad Sint-Niklaas =

Annual cycling race held in Sint-Niklaas, Belgium

- Poster to the 2023 edition

Race details
- Region: East Flanders
- Discipline: Road
- Competition: UCI Europe Tour
- Type: One-day race
- Web site: gp.stadstniklaas.be

History
- First edition: 1932
- Editions: 91 (as of 2023)
- First winner: Frans Bonduel (BEL); Romain Ghijssels (BEL)
- Most recent: Kobe Vanoverschelde (BEL)

Grote Prijs Stad Sint-Niklaas is a cycling race held annually in Sint-Niklaas, Belgium since 1932. In 2016 and 2017, it was a category 1.2 event on the UCI Europe Tour.

== Winners ==
- 1932 (Belgium) Frans Bonduel and (Belgium) Romain Ghijssels
- 1933 (Belgium) Romain Gijssels
- 1934 (Belgium) Fred Hamerlinck
- 1935 (Belgium) Gérard Loncke
- 1936 (Belgium) Antoon Cavé
- 1937 (Belgium) Michel D'Hooghe
- 1938 (Belgium) Roger Gijselinck
- 1939 (Belgium) Alfons Deloor
- 1940 (Belgium) Frans Cools
- 1941 (Belgium) Emile Faignaert
- 1942 (Belgium) Georges Claes
- 1943 (Belgium) Georges Claes
- 1944 (Belgium) Eugeen Jacobs
- 1945 (Belgium) Karel De Baere
- 1946 (Netherlands) Theo Middelkamp
- 1947 (Netherlands) Gerrit Schulte
- 1948 (Belgium) Achille Buysse
- 1949 (Belgium) Frans Van de Zande
- 1950 (Belgium) Isidoor De Rijck
- 1951 (Belgium) Karel De Baere
- 1952 (Belgium) Jaak Brutijn
- 1953 (Belgium) Jos De Feyter
- 1954 (Belgium) Jan De Valck
- 1955 (Belgium) Ludo Van Der Elst
- 1956 (Belgium) Marcel Rijckaert
- 1957 (Belgium) Léopold Schaecken
- 1958 (Belgium) Karel De Baere
- 1959 (Belgium) Jan Van Gompel
- 1960 (Belgium) R. Buys
- 1961 (Belgium) Rik Van Steenbergen
- 1962 (Belgium) Gilbert Maes
- 1963 (Belgium) Gilbert Maes
- 1964 (Belgium) Léo Van Dongen
- 1965 (Netherlands) Bart Zoet
- 1966 (Belgium) Henri Pauwels
- 1967 (Belgium) Theo Verschueren
- 1968 (Belgium) Valère Van Sweefelt
- 1969 (Belgium) Theo Verschueren
- 1970 (Belgium) Peter Head
- 1971 (Belgium) Roger Rosiers
- 1972 (Netherlands) Richard Bukacki
- 1973 (Belgium) Julien Stevens
- 1974 (Belgium) Ronny Van de Vijver

Year	Winner	Second	Third
1975	(Belgium) Benny Schepmans	(Belgium) Frans Van Looy	(Belgium) Tony Gakens
1976	(Belgium) Frans Van Looy	(Belgium) Serge Vandaele	(Belgium) Frans Verhaegen
1977	(Belgium) Willem Peeters	(Belgium) Luc Leman	(Belgium) Frans Van Looy
1978	(Netherlands) Cees Priem	(Belgium) Léo Van Thielen	(Belgium) René Van Gils
1979	(France) Jacques Osmont	(Belgium) Alfons De Bal	(Netherlands) Bert Oosterbosch
1980	(Belgium) Johnny De Nul	(Belgium) Wilfried Van den Broeck	(Belgium) Etienne De Beule
1981	(Belgium) Jos Gijsemans	(Belgium) Rudy Cottenies	(Belgium) Etienne De Beule
1982	(Belgium) Johnny De Nul	(Belgium) Jan Bogaert	(Belgium) Hendrik Caethoven
1983	(Belgium) Etienne De Wilde	(Belgium) Jan Bogaert	(Belgium) Marc Dierickx
1984	(Belgium) Jan Bogaert	(Belgium) William Tackaert	(Belgium) Ludwig Wynants
1985	(Belgium) Frans Van Vlierberghe	(Belgium) Marc Dierickx	(Netherlands) Martin Kemp
1986	(Netherlands) John Bogers	(Belgium) Roger De Cnijf	(Italy) Mario Mariotti
1987	(Belgium) Jan Bogaert	(Netherlands) Hans Daams	(Netherlands) Michel Cornelisse
1988	(Belgium) Jan Bogaert	(Belgium) Marnix Lameire	(Belgium) Werner Devos
1989	(Belgium) Dirk Heirweg	(Belgium) Daniel Beelen	(Belgium) Hendrik Redant
1990	(Belgium) Jan Bogaert	(Belgium) Patrice Bar	(Germany) Christian Henn
1991	(Netherlands) Michel Cornelisse	(Belgium) Johnny Dauwe	(Belgium) Jan Bogaert
1992	(Belgium) Johan Devos	(Belgium) Stephan Van Leeuwe	(Belgium) Corneille Daems
1993	(Belgium) Patrick De Wael	(Belgium) Jerry Cooman	(Netherlands) Michel Cornelisse
1994	(Netherlands) Raymond Meijs	(Netherlands) Martin van Steen	(Belgium) Paul Van Hyfte
1995	(Netherlands) Jans Koerts	(Belgium) Jan Nevens	(Belgium) Franky De Buyst
1996	(Belgium) Geert Van Bondt	(Belgium) Patrick De Wael	(Belgium) Willy Willems
1997	(Belgium) Peter Spaenhoven	(Belgium) Marc Streel	(Denmark) Brian Dalgaard Jensen
1998	(Belgium) Wim Omloop	(Belgium) Matthew Gilmore	(Belgium) Hans De Meester
1999	(Belgium) Nico Eeckhout	(Belgium) Etienne De Wilde	(Australia) Brett Aitken
2000	(Belgium) Danny Daelman	(Belgium) Wim Omloop	(Belgium) Ludo Dierckxsens
2001	(Belgium) Jurgen Vermeersch	(Netherlands) Berry Hoedemakers	(Belgium) Glenn D'Hollander
2002	(Belgium) Geert Omloop	(Belgium) Michel Vanhaecke	(Netherlands) Marc Vlijn
2003	(Belgium) Youri Deliens	(Netherlands) Rik Reinerink	(Belgium) Geert Omloop
2004	(Belgium) Tom Steels	(Belgium) Frank Vandenbroucke	(United Kingdom) Bradley Wiggins
2005	(Belgium) Serge Baguet	(Belgium) Tom Steels	(Belgium) Nick Nuyens
2006	(Belgium) Nico Eeckhout	(Belgium) Stijn Devolder	(Belgium) Kevin Van Impe
2007	(Belgium) Stijn Devolder	(Belgium) Greg Van Avermaet	(Belgium) Gorik Gardeyn
2008	(Belgium) Greg Van Avermaet	(Belgium) Tom Steels	(Belgium) Nick Nuyens
2009	(Belgium) Kristof Goddaert	(Belgium) Niels Albert	(Belgium) Serge Pauwels
2010	(Belgium) Wouter Weylandt	(Belgium) Frédéric Amorison	(Belgium) Sébastien Delfosse
2011	(Belgium) Nico Eeckhout	(Belgium) Kevin Peeters	(Belgium) Jonas Van Genechten
2012	(Lithuania) Egidijus Juodvalkis	(Netherlands) Bert-Jan Lindeman	(Belgium) Timothy Stevens
2013	(Australia) Leigh Howard	(Netherlands) Brian van Goethem	(Belgium) Christophe Prémont
2014	(Belgium) Maarten Craeghs	(Belgium) Kevin Peeters	(Belgium) Timothy Dupont
2015	(Belgium) Dries De Bondt	(Belgium) Joeri Stallaert	(Lithuania) Gediminas Kaupas
2016	(France) Justin Jules	(Belgium) Alfdan De Decker	(Australia) Anthony Giacoppo
2017	(Belgium) Gerben Thijssen	(Colombia) Álvaro Hodeg	(Belgium) Alexander Maes
2018	(Belgium) Michiel Dieleman	(Belgium) Cédric Raymackers	(Belgium) Dieter Bouvry
2019	(Belgium) Benjamin Verraes	(Greece) Polychronis Tzortzakis	(Belgium) Wesley Van Dyck
2020	No race
2021	(Belgium) Louis Blouwe	(Belgium) Toon Stippelmans	(Belgium) Sander Lemmens
2022	(Belgium) Joren Segers	(Belgium) Mauro Verwilt	(Belgium) Tom Timmermans
2023	(Belgium) Kobe Vanoverschelde	(Belgium) Thomas Joseph	(Netherlands) Piotr Havik
