= Gullegem Koerse =

Race details
- Date: June
- Region: Wevelgem, Belgium
- Discipline: Road
- Competition: UCI Europe Tour
- Type: One-day race
- Web site: www.gullegemkoerse.be/index-nl.aspx

History
- First edition: 1942
- Editions: 80 (as of 2025)
- First winner: Marcel Kint (BEL)
- Most wins: Wim Omloop (BEL); Theo Middelkamp (NED); (2 wins)
- Most recent: Dries De Bondt (BEL)

The Gullegem Koerse is a single-day road cycling race held annually in Wevelgem, Belgium over a course consisting of eight 20-kilometer laps. The race was first organized in 1942 and is one of the most important criterium races in Belgium, attracting a high level of competition.

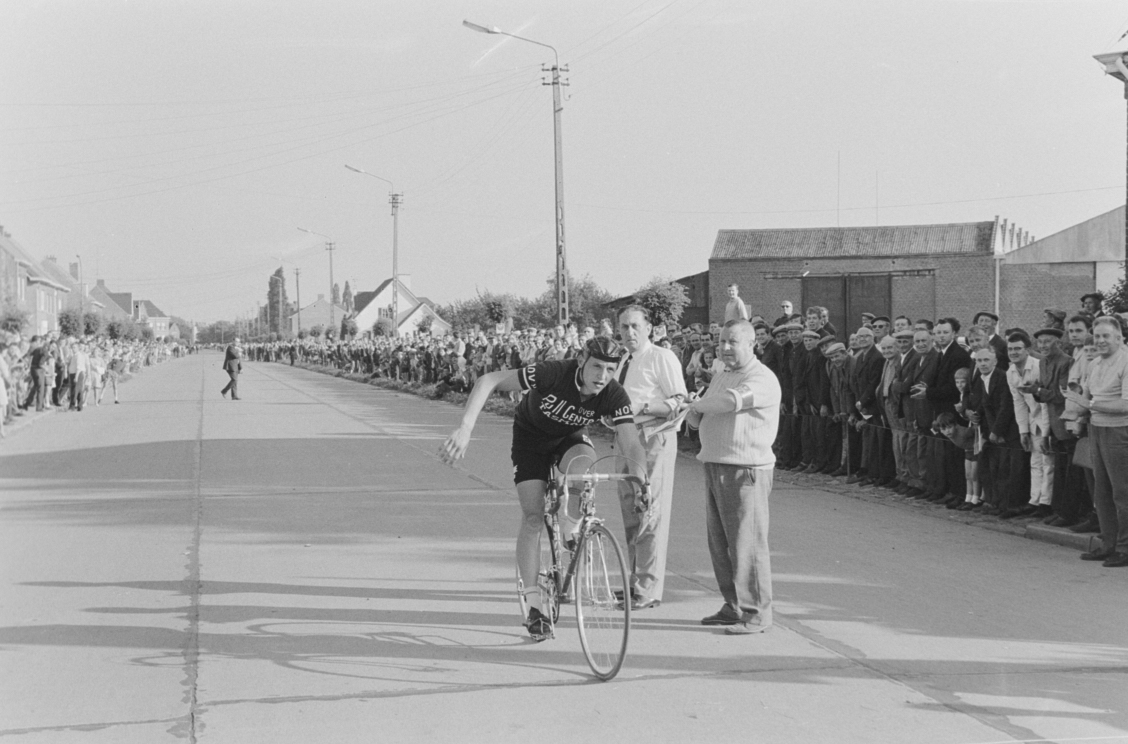
Noël Vantyghem winning 1969 Gullegem Koerse (collection KOERS Museum)

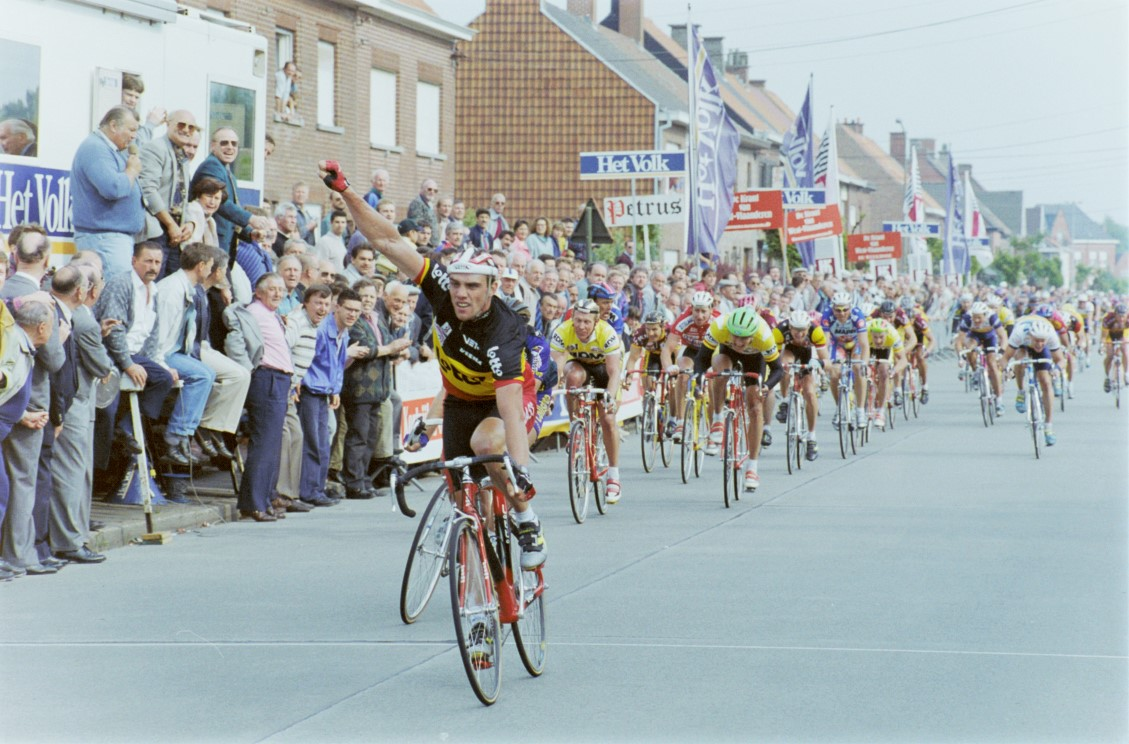
Wilfried Nelissen finishing first in Gullegem Koerse, 1995

== Winners ==
Year	Winner	Second	Third
1942	(Belgium) Marcel Kint	(Belgium) Albert Decin	(Belgium) Karel Kaers
1945	(Belgium) Albert Decin	(Belgium) Briek Schotte	(Belgium) Roger Cnockaert
1946	(Belgium) Ernest Sterckx	(Belgium) Briek Schotte	(Belgium) Sylvain Grysolle
1947	(Belgium) Roger Cnockaert	(Belgium) Emmanuel Thoma	(Belgium) Louis Brusselmans
1948	(Belgium) Emmanuel Thoma	(Belgium) Henri Bauwens	(Belgium) Stan Ockers
1949	(Belgium) André Declerck	(Belgium) Marcel Kint	(Belgium) André Maelbrancke
1950	(Belgium) Valère Ollivier	(Belgium) Briek Schotte	(Belgium) Albert Ramon
1951	(Belgium) Karel Leysen	(Belgium) Emmanuel Thoma	(Belgium) Maurice Mollin
1952	(France) César Marcelak	(Belgium) Maurice Joye	(Belgium) Emmanuel Thoma
1953	(Belgium) René Daelman	(Belgium) Henri Denys	(Belgium) Germain Derycke
1954	(Belgium) Omer Braekevelt	(Belgium) Lucien Honoré Victor	(Belgium) André Noyelle
1955	(Belgium) Willy Truye	(Belgium) Gilbert Desmet	(Belgium) René Mertens
1956	(Belgium) Karel Clerckx	(Belgium) Roger Devoldere	(Belgium) Julien Schepens
1957	(Belgium) Cyriel Van Bossel	(Belgium) Noël Foré	(Belgium) Maurice Meuleman
1958	(Belgium) Gustave Van Vaerenbergh	(Belgium) Gilbert Desmet	(Belgium) Marcel Ongenae
1959	(Belgium) Jozef Van Bael	(Belgium) Willy Vannitsen	(Belgium) Piet Oellibrandt
1960	(Belgium) Willy Truye	(Belgium) Noël Foré	(Belgium) Joseph Planckaert
1961	(Belgium) Joseph Planckaert	(Belgium) Romain Van Wynsberghe	(Belgium) Daniel Doom
1962	(Belgium) Marcel Ongenae	(Belgium) André Messelis	(Belgium) Frans Melckenbeeck
1963	(Belgium) Marcel Seynaeve	(Belgium) Jos Hoevenaers	(Belgium) Louis Proost
1964	(Belgium) André Messelis	(Belgium) Emile Daems	(Belgium) Etienne Vercauteren
1965	(Belgium) Lionel Vandamme	(Belgium) Georges Van Den Berghe	(Belgium) Bernard Van de Kerckhove
1966	(Belgium) Georges Delvael	(Belgium) Leon Gevaert	(Belgium) Georges Van Den Berghe
1967	(Belgium) Georges Vanconingsloo	(Belgium) Walter Godefroot	(Belgium) Roger Kindt
1968	(Belgium) Eric Leman	(Belgium) Bernard Van de Kerckhove	(Belgium) Walter Boucquet
1969	(Belgium) Noël Vantyghem	(Belgium) Ludo Vandromme	(Belgium) André Hendryckx
1970	(Belgium) André Dierickx	(Belgium) Julien Gaelens	(Belgium) Rudy Serruys
1971	(Belgium) Eric Leman	(Belgium) Noël Vantyghem	(Belgium) Fernand Van Rymenant
1972	(Belgium) Eddy Peelman	(Belgium) Willy Van Neste	(Netherlands) Richard Bukacki
1973	(Belgium) Frans Van Looy	(Belgium) Fernand Van Rymenant	(Netherlands) Gerard Vianen
1974	(Belgium) Ronald De Witte	(Belgium) Urbain De Brauwer	(Belgium) José Vanackere
1975	(Netherlands) Richard Bukacki	(Belgium) Lucien De Brauwere	(Belgium) Luc Leman
1976	(Belgium) Daniel Verplancke	(Belgium) Carlos Cuyle	(Belgium) Eddy Cael
1977	(Belgium) Patrick Lefevere	(Belgium) Marc Meernhout	(Belgium) Serge Vandaele
1978	(Belgium) Gustaaf Van Roosbroeck	(Belgium) Herman Van Springel	(Italy) Walter Dalgal
1979	(Belgium) Carlos Cuyle	(Belgium) Marc Demeyer	(Belgium) Herman Van Springel
1980	(Belgium) Dirk Baert	(Belgium) Dirk Heirweg	(Belgium) Ronny Vanmarcke
1981	(Belgium) Marc Renier	(Belgium) Andre Boonen	(France) Michel Demeyre
1982	(Belgium) Alain Desaever	(Belgium) Ludo Schurgers	(Belgium) Eddy Van Hoof
1983	(Belgium) Eddy Vanhaerens	(Netherlands) Bert Oosterbosch	(Netherlands) Adrie van Houwelingen
1984	(Belgium) Willy Teirlinck	(Belgium) Géry Verlinden	(Belgium) Luc De Smet
1985	(Belgium) José Vanackere	(Belgium) Alfons De Wolf	(Belgium) Luc Govaerts
1986	(Belgium) Dirk Heirweg	(Belgium) Jean-Luc Vandenbroucke	(Belgium) Frank Verleyen
1987	(Belgium) Marnix Lameire	(Belgium) Hendrik Redant	(Belgium) Rudy Pevenage
1988	(Belgium) Roger Ilegems	(Belgium) Werner Devos	(Belgium) Gino De Backer
1989	(Belgium) Marc Sprangers	(Belgium) Willy Willems	(Belgium) Jean-Marc Vandenberghe
1990	(Belgium) Johan Devos	(Netherlands) Marco van der Hulst	(Belgium) Peter Van Impe
1991	(Belgium) Luc Colijn	(Belgium) Rik Van Slycke	(Lithuania) Ivan Romanov
1992	(Belgium) Rik Van Slycke	(Belgium) Patrick Evenepoel	(Netherlands) Johan Melsen
1993	(Netherlands) Michel Cornelisse	(Belgium) Jean-Pierre Heynderickx	(Belgium) Niko Eeckhout
1994	(Belgium) Wim Omloop	(Belgium) Hans De Clercq	(Belgium) Willy Willems
1995	(Belgium) Wilfried Nelissen	(Belgium) Jo Planckaert	(Belgium) Jean-Pierre Heynderickx
1996	(Netherlands) Michel Cornelisse	(Netherlands) Jans Koerts	(Belgium) Jo Planckaert
1997	(Belgium) Hans De Meester	(Belgium) Dany Baeyens	(Denmark) Frank Høj
1998	(Belgium) Geert Van Bondt	(Denmark) Frank Høj	(Belgium) Bart Heirewegh
1999	(Belgium) Niko Eeckhout	(Lithuania) Saulius Ruškys	(Belgium) Jo Planckaert
2000	(Belgium) Nico Mattan	(Belgium) Wim Omloop	(Belgium) Geert Omloop
2001	(United Kingdom) Roger Hammond	(Belgium) Nico Mattan	(Belgium) Bert Roesems
2002	(Belgium) Peter Van Petegem	(Australia) Robbie McEwen	(Belgium) Geert Omloop
2003	(Belgium) Gino De Weirdt	(Belgium) Kurt Van Landeghem	(Belgium) Andrew Vancoillie
2004	(Belgium) Steven Caethoven	(Sweden) Stefan Adamsson	(Belgium) Geert Omloop
2005	(Belgium) Bart Vanheule	(Belgium) Niko Eeckhout	(Belgium) Ludo Dierckxsens
2006	(Belgium) Christoph Roodhooft	(Belgium) Dirk Clarysse	(Belgium) Steven De Decker
2007	(Belgium) Geert Omloop	(Belgium) Glenn D'Hollander	(France) David Boucher
2008	(Belgium) Bert De Backer	(Belgium) Nico Kuypers	(Germany) Frank Dressler-Lehnhof
2009	(Belgium) Wouter Weylandt	(Netherlands) Stefan van Dijk	(Belgium) Roy Sentjens
2010	(Belgium) Wouter Weylandt	(Belgium) Greg Van Avermaet	(Netherlands) Arnoud van Groen
2011	(Belgium) Philippe Gilbert	(Italy) Francesco Chicchi	(Lithuania) Aidis Kruopis
2012	(Italy) Matteo Trentin	(Belgium) Guillaume Van Keirsbulck	(Belgium) Kenny Dehaes
2013	(United Kingdom) Andrew Fenn	(Belgium) Yves Lampaert	(Belgium) Benjamin Verraes
2014	(Belgium) Jonas van Genechten	(Belgium) Gianni Meersman	(Belgium) Benjamin Verraes
2015	(Belgium) Kris Boeckmans	(Belgium) Benjamin Verraes	(Belgium) Greg Van Avermaet
2016	(Belgium) Greg Van Avermaet	(Belgium) Yves Lampaert	(Belgium) Tosh Van der Sande
2017	(Belgium) Yves Lampaert	(Belgium) Julien Vermote	(Belgium) Tim Declercq
2018	(Belgium) Jürgen Roelandts	(Belgium) Greg Van Avermaet	(Belgium) Oliver Naesen
2019	(Belgium) Yves Lampaert	(Denmark) Michael Mørkøv	(Belgium) Stan Dewulf
2021	(Belgium) Stan Van Tricht	(Belgium) Cériel Desal	(Belgium) Pieter Serry
2022	(Belgium) Remco Evenepoel	(Belgium) Sasha Weemaes	(Belgium) Jarne Van Grieken
2023	(Belgium) Warre Vangheluwe	(Belgium) Tim Merlier	(Belgium) Timothy Dupont
2024	(Slovakia) Martin Svrček	(Belgium) Yves Lampaert	(Belgium) Lionel Taminiaux
2025	(Belgium) Dries De Bondt	(Belgium) Yves Lampaert	(Belgium) Stan Dewulf
