= Omloop van de Vlasstreek =

Belgian cycling race

Race details
- Date: September (GP Heule: Sept, May, June)
- Region: Flanders, Belgium
- English name: Circuit of the Flax Region
- Local name(s): Omloop van de Vlasstreek (in Dutch), Circuit de la Région Linière (in French)
- Discipline: Road
- Competition: Cat. 1.2
- Type: One-day race

History
- First edition: 1945
- Editions: 49
- Final edition: 1994
- First winner: Jérôme Dofrumont (BEL)
- Most wins: André Rosseel (BEL); Marc Demeyer (BEL); (2 wins)
- Final winner: Bo Hamburger (DEN)

Omloop van de Vlasstreek was a Belgian post-WW II cycling race organized for the last time in 1994.

Heule, a small village in the Kortrijk region in West-Flanders, was both start and finish place.

In the first years, it was known as the G.P of Heule.

The competition's roll of honor includes the successes of Briek Schotte and Willy Teirlinck.

== Winners ==
Year	Winner	Second	Third
	Grand Prix Heule		
1945	(Belgium) Jérôme Dufromont	(Belgium) Maurice Desimpelaere	(Belgium) Roger Cnockaert
1946	(Belgium) Roger Decorte	(Belgium) Adolf Verschueren	(Belgium) Jan Landuyt
1947	(Belgium) Briek Schotte	(Belgium) Omer Dhaenens	(Belgium) Marcel Rijckaert
1948	(Belgium) Emmanuel Thoma	(Belgium) René Janssens	(Belgium) Hilaire Couvreur
1949	(Belgium) Valère Ollivier	(Belgium) Albert Decin	(Belgium) Arthur Mommerency
1950	(Belgium) Gustave Salembier	(Belgium) Robert Nolf	(Belgium) Emmanuel Thoma
1951	(Belgium) Henri Van Kerckhove	(Belgium) Gustave Salembier	(Belgium) Julien Van Dycke
1952	(Belgium) Lucien Mathys	(Belgium) Emmanuel Thoma	(Belgium) André Pieters
1953	(Belgium) René Mertens	(Belgium) André Pieters	(Belgium) Léopold De Graveleyn
1954	(Belgium) André Rosseel	(Belgium) Omer Braekeveldt	(Belgium) Julien Pascal
1955	(Belgium) Gilbert Desmet	(Belgium) Willy Truye	(Belgium) Briek Schotte
1956	(Belgium) André Rosseel	(Belgium) Roger Verplaetse	(Belgium) Florent Rondelé
1957	(Belgium) Jozef Verhelst	(Belgium) Roger Devoldere	(Belgium) René Mertens
	Omloop van de Vlasstreek		
1962	(Belgium) Robert Duveau	(Belgium) Karel De Laet	(Belgium) Romain Van Wynsberghe
1963	(Belgium) André Noyelle	(Belgium) Oswald Declercq	(Belgium) Bernard Van De Kerckove
1964	(Belgium) Norbert Kerckhove	(Belgium) Norbert Coreelman	(Belgium) André Noyelle
1965	(Belgium) Léon Verkndere	(Belgium) Lionel Van Damme	(Belgium) André Noyelle
1966	(Belgium) Frans Melckenbeeck	(Belgium) Georges Delvael	(Belgium) Roland Van De Rijse
1967	(Belgium) Willy Donie	(Belgium) Walter Godefroot	(Belgium) Jean Monteyne
1968	(Belgium) Antoon Houbrechts	(Belgium) Georges Smissaert	(Belgium) Walter Godefroot
1969	(Belgium) Jaak De Boever	(Belgium) Willy Donie	(Belgium) Daniel Van Ryckeghem
1970	(Belgium) Noël Van Tyghem	(Belgium) Walter Planckaert	(Belgium) Fernand Hermie
1971	(Belgium) Hubert Hutsebaut	(Belgium) Herman Vrijders	(Belgium) Daniel Van Ryckeghem
1972	(Belgium) Roger Rosiers	(Belgium) Gery Catteeuw	(Belgium) Julien Van Geeebergen
1973	(Belgium) Gery Catteeuw	(Colombia) Giovanni jiminez	(Belgium) Emile Lambrecht
1974	(Belgium) Marc Demeyer	(Netherlands) Fedor Den Hertog	(Belgium) Ferdinand Bracke
1975	No race		
1976	(Belgium) Lucien Zelck	(Belgium) André Dierickx	(Colombia) Giovanni jiminez
1977	(Belgium) Luc Leman	(Italy) Walter Dalgal	(Belgium) Etienne Vandersnickt
1978	(Belgium) Roger Verschaeve	(Belgium) Albert Van Vlierberghe	(Belgium) Eddy Van Haerens
1979	(Belgium) Marc Demeyer	(Belgium) Marc Meernhout	(Belgium) Luc Leman
1980	(Belgium) Lieven Malfait	(Belgium) Eddy Cael	(Belgium) Eddy Furniere
1981	(Belgium) Willy De Geest	(Belgium) Etienne De Wilde	(Belgium) Marc Goossens
1982	(Belgium) Dirk Baert	(Belgium) Jan Baeyens	(Belgium) Marc Goossens
1983	(Belgium) Eddy Van Haerens	(Belgium) Willy Planckaert	(Belgium) Johan Wellens
1984	(Belgium) Jacques Cambier	(Belgium) Patrick Devos	(Belgium) Gino Knockaert
1985	(Belgium) Willy Teirlinck	(Belgium) Luc Wallays	(Belgium) Dirk Demol
1986	(Belgium) Bert Van Ende	(Belgium) Dirk Heirweg	(Belgium) Wilfried Peeters
1987	(Belgium) Jean-Marc Vandenberghe	(Netherlands) Adrie Kools	(Belgium) Paul Haghedooren
1988	(Belgium) Johan Delathouwer	(Belgium) Johan Devos	(Belgium) Rudy Van Gheluwe
1989	(Denmark) Rolf Sørensen	(Belgium) Marnix Lameire	(Belgium) Peter Spaenhoven
1990	(Belgium) Jean-Marie Vernie	(Belgium) Peter Van Impe	(United Kingdom) Harry Lodge
1991	(Belgium) Hendrik Redant	(Belgium) Johan Devos	(Belgium) Johan Museeuw
1992	(Belgium) Jan Bogaert	(Belgium) Jean-Pierre Heynderickx	(Belgium) Rudy Verdonck
1993	(Belgium) Patrick Van Roosbroeck	(Belgium) Johan Devos	(Belgium) Paul Haghedooren
1994	(Denmark) Bo Hamburger	(Netherlands) Bart Voskamp	(United Kingdom) Nigel Perry
