= Memorial Fred De Bruyne =

Belgian cycling race

Memorial Fred De Bruynee
- Poster of the 2019 edition

Race details
- Date: September
- Region: Berlare, East Flanders (Belgium)
- Discipline: Road
- Competition: Criterium
- Type: One-day race

History
- First edition: 1951
- Editions: 74
- First winner: Robert Vercammen (BEL)
- Most wins: Oliver Naesen (BEL); (6 wins)
- Most recent: Oliver Naesen (BEL)

The Memorial Fred De Bruyne is a Belgian cycling race that was organized for the first time in 1951.

The course is situated in the region of East-Flanders, with Berlare as both start and finish place.

The competition's roll of honor includes the successes of Rik Van Looy, Walter Godefroot and Greg Van Avermaet. The record of victories, however, belongs to Oliver Naesen.

For years, the race was named Grote Prijs Berlare. Since 2009, the race has been named after former cyclist and cycling reporter Fred De Bruyne, who was born in Berlare and won the race three times.

== Winners ==
Year	Country	Rider	Team
1951	Belgium	Robert Vercammen	Presco
1952	Belgium	Maurice Blomme	Bertin-D'Alessandro
1953	Belgium	Giel Hendrickx	Plume Sport
1954	Belgium	Fred De Bruyne	Mercier–Hutchinson
1955	Belgium	Jozef Schils	Van Hauwaert–Maes
1956	Belgium	Roger Verplaetse	Faema–Guerra
1957	Belgium	Fred De Bruyne	Carpano-Coppi
1958	Belgium	Fred De Bruyne	Carpano
1959	Belgium	Willy Vannitsen	Ghigi-Ganna
1960	Belgium	Willy Derboven	Faema
1961	Belgium	Robert Lelangue	Solo–Van Steenbergen
1962	Belgium	Rik Van Looy	Flandria-Faema
1963	Belgium	Hugo Scrayen	Solo–Terrot
1964	Belgium	Lode Troonbeeckx	Dr. Mann–Labo
1965	Belgium	Michel Jacquemin	Peugeot–BP–Michelin
1966	Belgium	Jos Huysmans	Dr. Mann–Grundig
1967	Belgium	Walter Godefroot	Flandria–De Clerck
1968	Belgium	Frans Verstraeten	Okay Whisky-Diamant- Simons
1969	Netherlands	Richard Bukacki	Tibetan–Pull Over Centrale
1970	Belgium	Ferdinand Hermie	Geens–Watneys
1971	Belgium	Roger Jochmans	Hertekamp–Magniflex
1972	Netherlands	Richard Bukacki	Goldor–IJsboerke
1973	Netherlands	Leo Duyndam	Frisol
1974	Belgium	Alfons De Bal	MIC–Ludo–de Gribaldy
1975	Belgium	Ronny Van de Vijver	IJsboerke–Colnago
1976	Belgium	Rik Van Linden	Bianchi–Campagnolo
1977	Belgium	Willem Peeters	IJsboerke–Colner
1978	Belgium	André Dierickx	IJsboerke–Gios
1979	Belgium	Ludo Delcroix	IJsboerke–Warncke Eis
1980	Belgium	Etienne De Wilde	Splendor
1981	Belgium	Leo Van Thielen	Eurobouw
1982	Belgium	Luc Colyn	DAF Trucks–TeVe Blad–Rossin
1983	Belgium	Dirk Heirweg	Safir–Van de Ven
1984	Belgium	Etienne Van der Helst	TeVe Blad–Perlav
1985	Belgium	Dirk Heirweg	Safir–Van de Ven
1986	Belgium	Wim Arras	PDM–Ultima–Concorde
1987	Netherlands	Peter Harings	Panasonic–Isostar
1988	Belgium	Gino De Backer	ADR–Anti-M–Enerday
1989	Belgium	Johan Bruyneel	S.E.F.B
1990	Belgium	Noël Segers	Buckler
1991	Belgium	Jerry Cooman	S.E.F.B
1992	Belgium	Jerry Cooman	Tulip Computers
1993	Belgium	Jo Planckaert	Novemail–Histor–Laser Computer
1994	Belgium	Hans De Meester	Palmans
1995	Belgium	Jo Planckaert	Collstrop-Lystex
1996	Belgium	Hans De Meester	Palmans
1997	Belgium	Andy De Smet	Ipso–Euroclean
1998	Netherlands	Michel Cornelisse	Spar–RDM
1999	Belgium	Matthew Gilmore	RDM
2000	United Kingdom	Roger Hammond	Collstrop–Palmans
2001	Belgium	Frank Corvers	Memory Card–Jack & Jones
2002	Belgium	Geert Omloop	Collstrop–Palmans
2003	Belgium	Jehudi Schoonacker	Vlaanderen–T-Interim
2004	Belgium	Staf Scheirlinckx	Flanders Itemnova
2005	France	David Boucher	MrBookmaker.com–SportsTech
2006	Belgium	Greg Van Avermaet	Bodysol-Win for Life-Jong Vlaanderen
2007	Belgium	Gregory Habeaux	Jartazi–Promo Fashion
2008	Australia	Rhys Pollock	Trek–Marco Polo
2009	Lithuania	Egidijus Juodvalkis	Team Piemonte
2010	Belgium	Rob Goris	Palmans–Cras
2011	Belgium	Kenny Dehaes	Omega Pharma–Lotto
2012	Belgium	Koen Barbé	Landbouwkrediet
2013	Belgium	Preben Van Hecke	Topsport Vlaanderen
2014	Belgium	Oliver Naesen	Lotto–Belisol
2015	Belgium	Oliver Naesen	Topsport Vlaanderen–Baloise
2016	Belgium	Timothy Stevens	Crelan–Vastgoedservice
2017	Belgium	Oliver Naesen	AG2R La Mondiale
2018	Belgium	Oliver Naesen	AG2R La Mondiale
2019	Belgium	Bo Godart	Davo–Imanex–RB Zelfbouw
2020	Belgium	Tom Paquot	Bingoal WB Development Team
2021	Belgium	Oliver Naesen	AG2R–Citroën
2022	Belgium	Gilles De Wilde	Sport Vlaanderen–Baloise
2023	Norway	André Drege	Team Coop
2024	Belgium	Oliver Naesen	AG2R–Citroën
