= Grote Prijs Beeckman-De Caluwé =

Belgian one-day cycling race

Race details
- Date: July
- Region: Ninove, Flanders, Belgium
- English name: Grand Prix Beeckman-De Caluwé
- Discipline: Road race
- Type: Single-day
- Organiser: Denderclub Ninove

History
- First edition: 1943
- Editions: 79 (as of 2022)
- Final edition: 2022
- First winner: Frans Cools (BEL)
- Most wins: André Dierickx (BEL); Dirk Heirweg (BEL) (3 wins)
- Final winner: Jules Hesters (BEL)

Grote Prijs Beeckman-De Caluwé is a single-day road bicycle race held annually in July in Ninove, Belgium. The 169 km race is named after the local cyclists Kamiel Beeckman and Edgard de Caluwé, winner of the Tour of Flanders (1938).

== Winners ==
| Year | Country | Rider | Team |
|---|---|---|---|
| 1943 | Belgium | Frans Cools | |
| 1944 | Belgium | Marcel Kint | |
| 1945 | Belgium | Edgard de Caluwé | |
| 1946 | Belgium | Edward Van Dijck | |
| 1947 | Belgium | Jules De Poorter | ' |
| 1948 | Belgium | Emiel Rogiers | |
| 1949 | Belgium | Lode Anthonis | |
| 1950 | Belgium | Albert Ramon | |
| 1951 | Belgium | René Mertens | |
| 1952 | Belgium | Roger De Corte | |
| 1953 | Belgium | Jozef Schils | |
| 1954 | Belgium | Pino Cerami | |
| 1955 | Belgium | Frans Schoubben | |
| 1956 | Belgium | Emiel Van Cauter | |
| 1957 | Belgium | Jan Van Gompel | |
| 1958 | Belgium | Gentiel Saelens | |
| 1959 | Netherlands | Gerrit Voorting | ' |
| 1960 | Belgium | Willy Schroeders | |
| 1961 | Belgium | Rik Luyten | |
| 1962 | Belgium | Norbert Kerckhove | |
| 1963 | Belgium | Ludo Janssens | |
| 1964 | Belgium | Roger Cooreman | |
| 1965 | Belgium | Rik Van Looy | |
| 1966 | Belgium | Walter Godefroot | |
| 1967 | Belgium | Remi Van Vreckom | |
| 1968 | Belgium | Etienne Sonck | |
| 1969 | Belgium | Martin Van Den Bossche | |
| 1970 | Belgium | André Dierickx | |
| 1971 | Belgium | Maurice Dury | |
| 1972 | Belgium | Pieter Nassen | |
| 1973 | Belgium | Eduard Janssens | |
| 1974 | Belgium | Albert Van Vlierberghe | |
| 1975 | Belgium | André Dierickx | |
| 1976 | Belgium | André Dierickx | |
| 1977 | Belgium | Albert Delcroix | |
| 1978 | Belgium | Géry Verlinden | |
| 1979 | Belgium | Jean-Luc Vandenbroucke | |
| 1980 | Belgium | Willy Teirlinck | |
| 1981 | Belgium | Willy Teirlinck | |
| 1982 | Belgium | Willem Peeters | |
| 1983 | Belgium | Dirk Heirweg | |
| 1984 | Belgium | Dirk Heirweg | |
| 1985 | Belgium | Noël Segers | |
| 1986 | Belgium | Dirk Heirweg | |
| 1987 | Belgium | Etienne De Wilde | |
| 1988 | Belgium | Peter De Clercq | |
| 1989 | Belgium | Koen Vekemans | |
| 1990 | Netherlands | Louis de Koning | |
| 1991 | Switzerland | Heinz Imboden | |
| 1992 | Belgium | Didier Priem | |
| 1993 | Belgium | Benjamin Van Itterbeeck | |
| 1994 | Netherlands | Wiebren Veenstra | |
| 1995 | Belgium | Michel Van Haecke | |
| 1996 | Belgium | Tony Bracke | |
| 1997 | Belgium | Johan De Geyter | |
| 1998 | Belgium | Peter Van Petegem | |
| 1999 | Belgium | Bart Heirewegh | |
| 2000 | Belgium | Wim Vansevenant | Farm Frites |
| 2001 | Belgium | Eric De Clercq | Collstrop–Palmans |
| 2002 | Belgium | Björn Leukemans | Palmans–Collstrop |
| 2003 | Belgium | Andy De Smet | Palmans–Collstrop |
| 2004 | Belgium | Erwin Thijs | Mr. Bookmaker–Palmans–Collstrop |
| 2005 | Belgium | Niko Eeckhout | Chocolade Jacques–T Interim |
| 2006 | Belgium | Maarten Wynants | Chocolade Jacques–Topsport Vlaanderen |
| 2007 | Belgium | Geert Omloop | Jartazi–Promo Fashion |
| 2008 | Belgium | Jérôme Baugnies | Davitamon–Lotto–Jong Vlaanderen |
| 2009 | Belgium | Kenny Dehaes | Silence–Lotto |
| 2010 | Belgium | Kenny Dehaes | Omega Pharma–Lotto |
| 2011 | Belgium | Joeri Stallaert | Landbouwkrediet |
| 2012 | Great Britain | Mark McNally | An Post–Sean Kelly |
| 2013 | France | Arnaud Démare | FDJ.fr |
| 2014 | Belgium | Tom Van Asbroeck | Topsport Vlaanderen–Baloise |
| 2015 | Netherlands | Maarten Tjallingii | LottoNL–Jumbo |
| 2016 | Netherlands | Peter Koning | Drapac Professional Cycling |
| 2017 | Germany | Jonas Bokeloh | An Post–Chain Reaction |
| 2018 | Belgium | Tom Van Asbroeck | EF Education First–Drapac p/b Cannondale |
| 2019 | Belgium | Dries De Bondt | Corendon–Circus |
| 2020 | No race due to COVID-19 pandemic | | |
| 2021 | Belgium | Jens Reynders | Sport Vlaanderen–Baloise |
| 2022 | Belgium | Jules Hesters | Sport Vlaanderen–Baloise |
