= Hans Dekkers (cyclist, born 1981) =

Bicycle racer

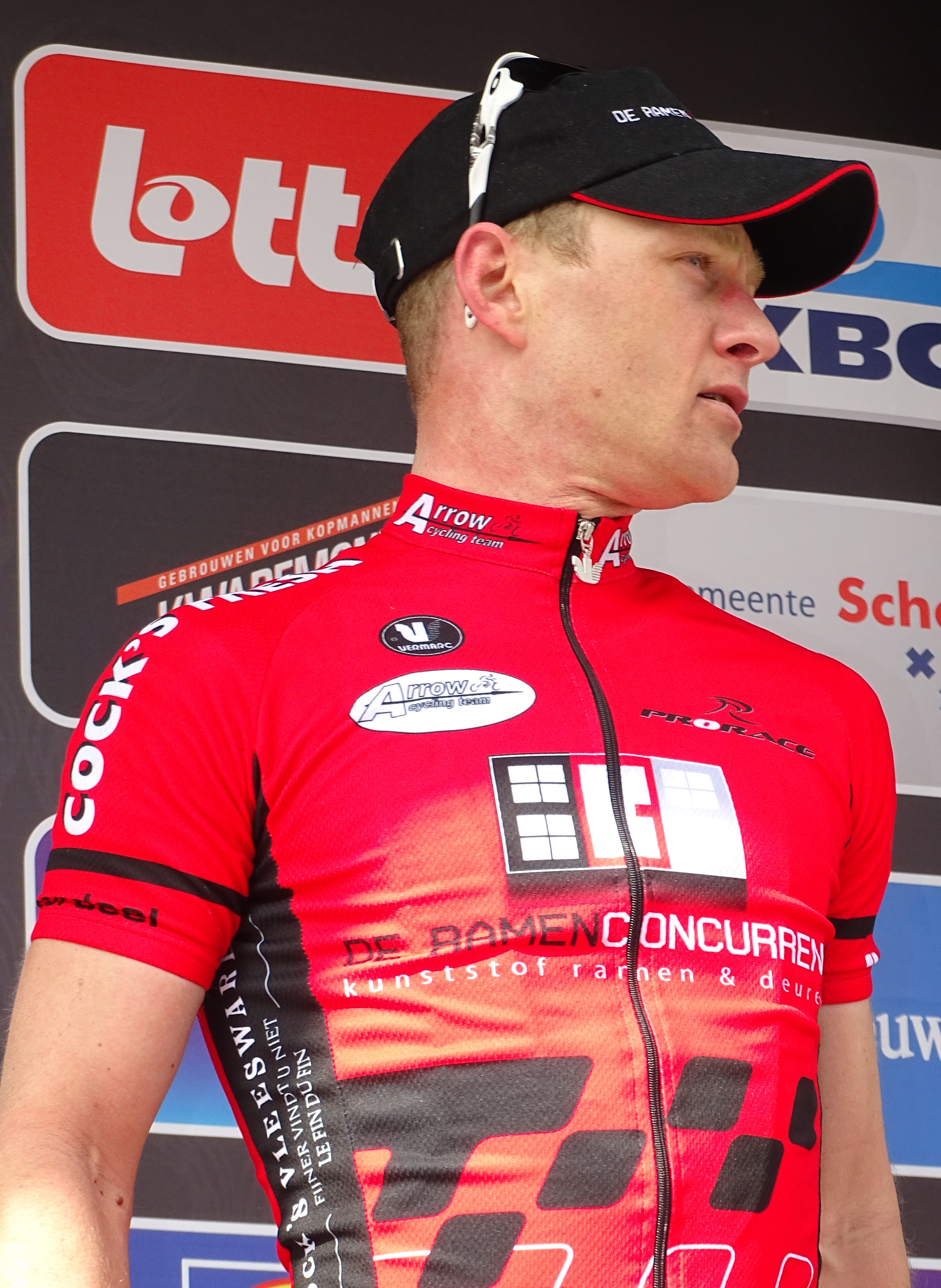

Personal information
- Born: 8 August 1981 (age 45) Eindhoven, Netherlands

Cycling career
- Sport: Cycling
- Discipline: Road
- Role: Rider

Amateur teams
- 2003: Rabobank (stagiaire)
- 2005: Rabobank Continental Team
- 2012–2013: TML Dommelstreek
- 2014–: Arrow CT

Professional teams
- 2002–2003: Rabobank TT3
- 2004: Rabobank
- 2006–2007: Agritubel
- 2008: Mitsubishi–Jartazi
- 2009: Garmin–Slipstream
- 2010–2011: Landbouwkrediet

Hans Dekkers (born 8 August 1981, in Eindhoven) is a Dutch racing cyclist.

== Major results ==
2001
1st Stage 6 Ruban Granitier Breton
1st Stage 1 Mainfranken-Tour
2002
1st Grand Prix de Waregem
Mainfranken-Tour

1st Stages 2 & 4

1st Stage 1 Le Triptyque des Monts et Châteaux
1st Stage 1 Ruban Granitier Breton
1st Stage 7 Olympia's Tour
3rd Road race, National Under-23 Road Championships
3rd ZLM Tour
2003
Olympia's Tour

1st Points classification
1st Stages 2, 4 & 5

Tour de Normandie

1st Stages 1 & 4

1st Stage 1 Le Triptyque des Monts et Châteaux
2nd Road race, National Under-23 Road Championships
2nd Beverbeek Classic
2004
2nd Nationale Sluitingsprijs
2005
1st Memorial Van Coningsloo
Tour du Loir-et-Cher

1st Stages 2 & 4

Olympia's Tour

1st Stages 1 & 4

1st Stage 3 GP CTT Correios de Portugal
2nd Beverbeek Classic
3rd Overall Tour du Loir-et-Cher
4th Overall Tour de Normandie

1st Stages 2, 6 & 7

4th Ronde van Noord-Holland
9th Omloop der Kempen
2006
1st Stage 3 Tour de l'Avenir
2nd Scratch, National Track Championships
3rd Grand Prix de Denain
3rd Grand Prix de Rennes
2007
1st Stage 2 Driedaagse van West-Vlaanderen
2008
1st Nationale Sluitingsprijs
2nd Omloop van de Vlaamse Scheldeboorden
6th Omloop van het Houtland
8th Rund um die Nürnberger Altstadt
2009
1st Stage 1 (TTT) Tour of Qatar
2nd Overall International Cycling Classic

1st Stage 4

2010
8th Beverbeek Classic
2011
7th Omloop van het Waasland
