= Johan Devos =

Belgian cyclist (born 1966)

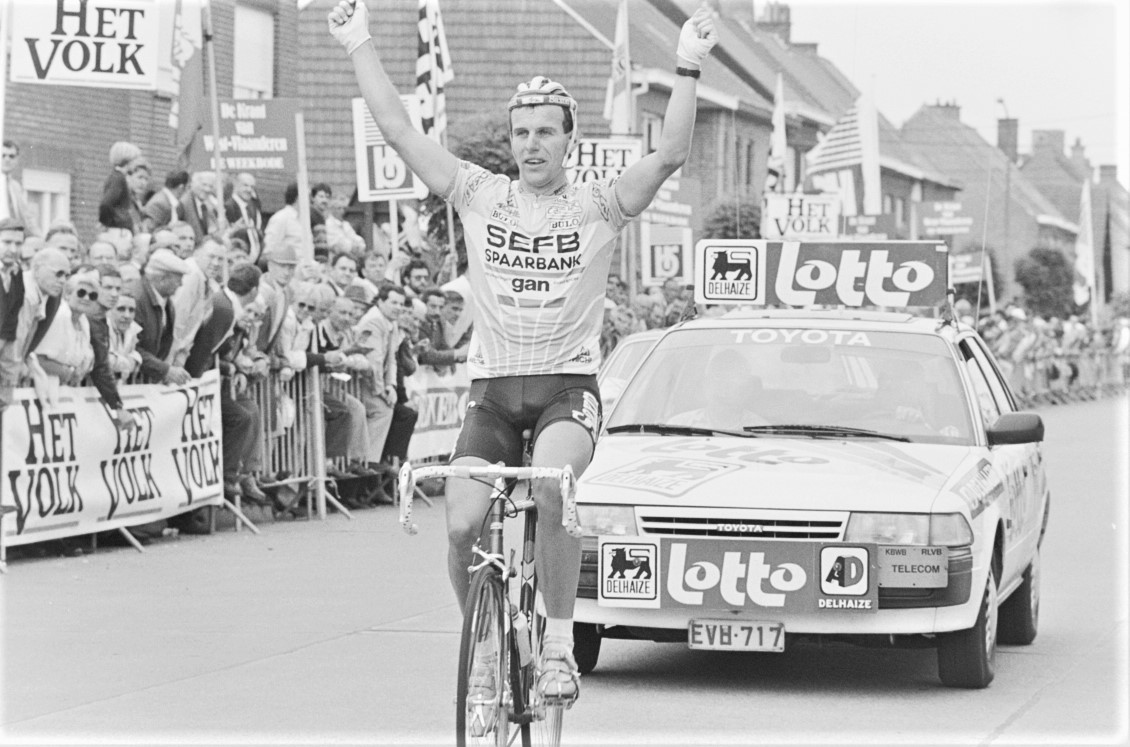
- Devos winning the Gullegem Koerse in 1990

Personal information
- Born: 10 May 1966 (age 60) Roeselare, Belgium

Cycling career
- Sport: Cycling
- Discipline: Road
- Role: Rider

Professional teams
- 1988: AD Renting–Mini-Flat–Enerday
- 1989: Humo–TW
- 1990–1991: S.E.F.B.–Saxon–Gan
- 1992–1993: La William–Duvel
- 1994: Vlaanderen 2002–Eddy Merckx

Johan Devos (born 10 May 1966) is a Belgian former road cyclist, who competed as a professional from 1988 to 1994.

== Major results ==
1987
2nd Kattekoers
1988
1st Omloop Mandel-Leie-Schelde
2nd Omloop van de Vlasstreek
4th Nationale Sluitingprijs
6th Brussel–Ingooigem
9th Kuurne–Brussels–Kuurne
1989
1st Grote 1-MeiPrijs
3rd Kuurne–Brussels–Kuurne
3rd Omloop van het Houtland
7th Kampioenschap van Vlaanderen
7th GP Stad Zottegem
8th Nokere Koerse
9th Omloop van de Westhoek
1990
1st Gullegem Koerse
3rd Grote Prijs Jef Scherens
7th Kuurne–Brussels–Kuurne
7th De Kustpijl
8th Le Samyn
1991
2nd Omloop van de Vlasstreek
3rd Omloop van het Houtland
4th Kuurne–Brussels–Kuurne
7th Kampioenschap van Vlaanderen
8th Le Samyn
1992
1st Omloop van het Houtland
1st Grote Prijs Stad Sint-Niklaas
1st Grote Prijs Raf Jonckheere
3rd Road race, National Road Championships
3rd Grote 1-MeiPrijs
4th Kampioenschap van Vlaanderen
4th Ronde van Limburg
5th Le Samyn
1993
1st Brussel–Ingooigem
2nd Omloop van de Vlasstreek
4th Ronde van Limburg
4th GP Rik Van Steenbergen
10th Binche–Tournai–Binche
