= Omloop van het Waasland =

Belgian one-day road cycling race

- Poster to the 2023 edition

Race details
- Date: March
- Region: Waasland, Belgium
- English name: Tour of Waasland
- Local name: Omloop van het Waasland
- Discipline: Road
- Competition: National calendar
- Type: Single-day
- Web site: www.omloopvanhetwaasland.eu

History
- First edition: 1965
- Editions: 60 (as of 2026)
- First winner: Martin Van Ginneken (NED)
- Most wins: Niko Eeckhout (BEL) (3 wins)
- Most recent: Kenny Molly (BEL)

Omloop van het Waasland ("Circuit of Waasland") is a bicycle road race held annually in the Belgian region of Waasland. From 2005 to 2016, it was organized as a 1.2 event on the UCI Europe Tour before being moved to the national calendar. In 2024, the race returned to the UCI Europe Tour.

It is also known for being the last professional cycling race in which Eddy Merckx took part before retiring in 1978.

== Winners ==
Year	Country	Rider	Team
1965	Netherlands	Martin van Ginneken	Dr. Mann
1966	Netherlands	Rik Wouters	Televizier–Batavus
1967	Belgium	Martin Van Den Bossche	Romeo–Smith's
1968	Belgium	Jos Boons	Mann–Grundig
1969	France	Jean-Claude Genty	Bic
1970	Belgium	Etienne Antheunis	Faemino–Faema
1971	Belgium	Walter Planckaert	Goldor
1972	Belgium	Luc Van Goidsenhoven	Watneys–Avia
1973	Netherlands	Gerben Karstens	Ha–Ro
1974	Netherlands	Tino Tabak	TI–Raleigh
1975	Belgium	Serge Van Daele	Gero–Hercka
1976	Belgium	Eddy Verstraeten	IJsboerke–Colnago
1977	Belgium	Marc Renier	IJsboerke–Colnago
1978	Belgium	Frans Van Looy	Mini Flat–Boule d'Or
1979	Belgium	Johnny De Nul	Lano–Boule d'Or
1980	Belgium	Willem Peeters	Safir–Ludo
1981	Belgium	Patrick Versluys	Boule d'Or
1982	Belgium	Johnny De Nul	Masta–Puch
1983	Belgium	Alain Van Hoornweder	Fangio–Tönissteiner
1984	Belgium	Yvan Lamote	Splendor–Mondial Moquette
1985	Belgium	William Tackaert	Fangio–Ecoturbo
1986	Belgium	Frank Verleyen	Transvemij–Van Schilt
1987	Netherlands	Frank Pirard	Sigma
1988	Netherlands	Erik Breukink	Panasonic–Isostar
1989	Netherlands	Frank Pirard	Histor–Sigma
1990	Belgium	Luc Govaerts	Westwood
1991	Belgium	Jerry Cooman	S.E.F.B.–Saxon
1992	Belgium	Fabrice Naessens	Lotto
1993	Netherlands	Menno Vink	Willy Naessens
1994	Belgium	Jan Bogaert	Palmans–Inco Coating
1995	Belgium	Hendrik Redant	TVM
1996	Belgium	Michel Vanhaecke	Vosschemie–Zetelhallen
1997	Belgium	Wim Omloop	Palmans–Lystex
1998	Denmark	Frank Høj	Palmans–Ideal
1999	Belgium	Geert Omloop	Spar–RDM
2000	Netherlands	Jans Koerts	Farm Frites
2001	Netherlands	Martin van Steen	BankGiroLoterij–Batavus
2002	Netherlands	Peter van Agtmaal	Bert Story–Piels
2003	Belgium	Geert Omloop	Palmans–Collstrop
2004	Belgium	Christoph Roodhooft	MrBookmaker.com–Palmans
2005	Belgium	Gorik Gardeyn	MrBookmaker.com–SportsTech
2006	Belgium	Niko Eeckhout	Chocolade Jacques
2007	Belgium	Niko Eeckhout	Chocolade Jacques
2008	Belgium	Niko Eeckhout	Topsport Vlaanderen
2009	Belgium	Johan Coenen	Topsport Vlaanderen–Mercator
2010	France	Denis Flahaut	ISD Continental Team
2011	Lithuania	Aidis Kruopis	Landbouwkrediet
2012	Belgium	Preben Van Hecke	Topsport Vlaanderen–Mercator
2013	Belgium	Pieter Jacobs	Topsport Vlaanderen–Baloise
2014	Italy	Danilo Napolitano	Wanty–Groupe Gobert
2015	Netherlands	Geert van der Weijst	Team3M
2016	Belgium	Preben Van Hecke	Topsport Vlaanderen–Baloise
2017	Netherlands	Wouter Wippert	Cannondale–Drapac
2018	Belgium	Benjamin Verraes	Van Durme–Michiels–Trawobo
2019	Great Britain	Alexandar Richardson	Canyon dhb p/b Bloor Homes
2020– 2021	No race due to the COVID-19 pandemic in Belgium		
2022	Belgium	Brent Clé	Stageco Cycling Team
2023	France	Samuel Leroux	Go Sport–Roubaix–Lille Métropole
2024	France	Samuel Leroux	Van Rysel–Roubaix
2025	Australia	Jensen Plowright	Alpecin–Deceuninck Development Team
2026	Belgium	Kenny Molly	Van Rysel–Roubaix
