= Christoph Roodhooft =

Belgian racing cyclist and team manager

Personal information
- Born: 18 January 1974 (age 52) Herentals, Belgium
- Height: 1.75 m (5 ft 9 in)

Cycling career
- Sport: Cycling
- Current team: Alpecin–Premier Tech; Fenix–Premier Tech; Alpecin–Premier Tech Development Team; Fenix–Deceuninck Development Team
- Disciplines: Road; Cyclo-cross
- Role: Rider; Directeur sportif

Professional teams
- 2001–2002: Flanders–Prefetex
- 2003: Palmans–Collstrop
- 2004–2005: Mr. Bookmaker–Palmans–Collstrop
- 2006–2007: Palmans–Collstrop

Managerial teams
- 2009–: BKCP–Powerplus
- 2023–: Alpecin–Deceuninck Development Team
- 2023–: Fenix–Deceuninck
- 2024–: Fenix–Deceuninck Development Team

Christoph Roodhooft (born 18 January 1974) is a Belgian former professional cyclist and the head directeur sportif of UCI WorldTeam Alpecin–Premier Tech, in addition to the associated women's team Fenix–Premier Tech and development teams Alpecin–Premier Tech Development Team and Fenix–Deceuninck Development Team. After competing professionally from 2001 to 2007, he became the sports director of BKCP–Powerplus alongside his brother Philip in 2009. The two were both awarded the Crystal Bicycle for best team manager in 2021 and 2023.

In 2009, Roodhooft admitted to having possessed DHEA in his career, but received a suspended sentence.

== Major results ==
1996
2nd Grand Prix de Waregem
6th Ronde van Vlaanderen U23
1998
1st Brussel-Opwijk
2001
2nd Nationale Sluitingsprijs
2002
9th Brussel–Ingooigem
10th Ronde van Noord-Holland
10th Grote 1-MeiPrijs
2003
2nd Omloop van het Houtland
2nd Grote Prijs Marcel Kint
4th Vlaamse Havenpijl
5th Nationale Sluitingsprijs
2004
1st Omloop van het Waasland
5th Dwars door Gendringen
9th Scheldeprijs
9th Ronde van Midden-Zeeland
2005
7th Noord-Nederland Tour
2006
1st Gullegem Koerse
8th Grote 1-MeiPrijs
