= Kevin Peeters =

Belgian cyclist

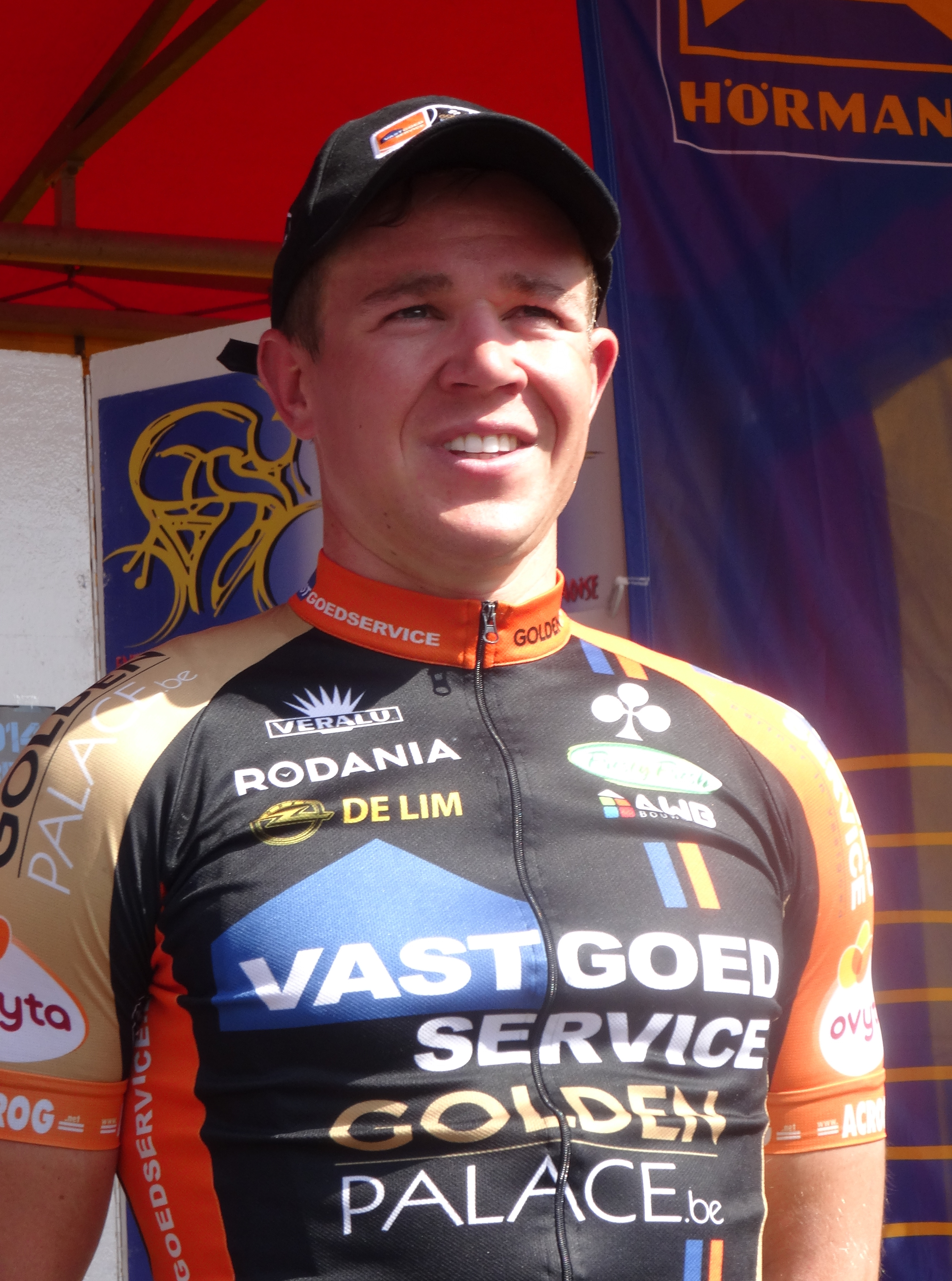
- Peeters in 2014

Personal information
- Full name: Kevin Peeters
- Born: 5 February 1987 (age 39) Lier, Belgium

Cycling career
- Sport: Cycling
- Current team: Retired
- Discipline: Road
- Role: Rider

Amateur team
- 2008: Scott

Professional teams
- 2006: Yawadoo–ABM–TV Vlaanderen
- 2007: Davo
- 2009–2013: Landbouwkrediet–Colnago
- 2014–2015: Vastgoedservice–Golden Palace

Kevin Peeters (born 5 February 1987 in Lier) is a Belgian former cyclist.

== Major results ==
2008
3rd Memorial Van Coningsloo
3rd Gooikse Pijl
2010
8th Schaal Sels
2011
4th Beverbeek Classic
4th Schaal Sels
7th Memorial Rik Van Steenbergen
8th De Vlaamse Pijl
10th Kampioenschap van Vlaanderen
2012
2nd Grote 1-MeiPrijs
3rd Grand Prix Impanis-Van Petegem
7th Nationale Sluitingsprijs
9th Ronde van Limburg
2014
1st Grand Prix Criquielion
6th Gooikse Pijl
9th Kernen Omloop Echt-Susteren
2015
5th Ronde van Overijssel
