= Transvemij–Van Schilt =

Team information
- Registered: Netherlands
- Founded: 1980
- Disbanded: 1987
- Discipline: Road

Team name history
- 1980 1981 1982 1983–1984 1985 1986–1987: Elro Snacks–Rogelli; Femis Bank–Elro Snacks; B & S Wegenbouw–Elro Snacks; Elro Snacks–Auto Brabant; Nikon–Van Schilt–Elro Snacks; Transvemij–Van Schilt

Transvemij–Van Schilt, also known as Elro Snacks, was a Dutch professional cycling team that competed from 1980 to 1987.

The Elro Snacks company sponsored the team from 1980 to 1985. In 1985 Belgian sprinter Freddy Maertens rode for the team then known as Nikon-Van Schilt-Elro Snacks-Colnago. The team competed in one Grand Tour: the 1987 Giro d'Italia. The team was succeeded by TVM–Van Schilt, which formed the following year after it folded.

== Major wins ==
1987
Schaal Sels, Frank Verleyen
Omloop van het Waasland, Frank Verleyen
