= Serge Baguet =

Belgian cyclist

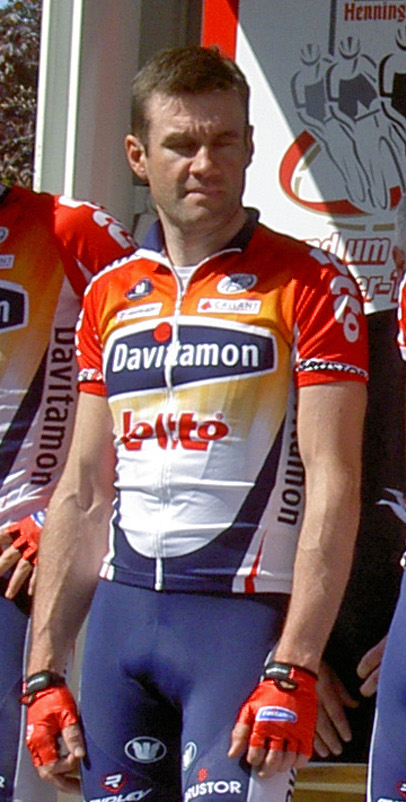

Personal information
- Full name: Serge Baguet
- Born: 18 August 1969 Opbrakel, Belgium
- Died: 9 February 2017 (aged 47) Letterhoutem, Belgium
- Height: 1.77 m (5 ft 10 in)
- Weight: 67 kg (148 lb)

Cycling career
- Sport: Cycling
- Discipline: Road
- Role: Rider

Professional teams
- 1990–1995: Lotto–Superclub
- 1996: Vlaanderen 2002–Eddy Merckx
- 2000–2005: Lotto–Adecco
- 2006–2007: Quick-Step–Innergetic

Major wins
- Grand Tours Tour de France 1 individual stage (2001) One-day races and Classics National Road Race Championships (2005)

Serge Baguet (18 August 1969 – 9 February 2017) was a Belgian professional road bicycle racer.

== Career ==
He was the son of the ex-cyclist Roger Baguet. He was married to Sandra Rasschaert and they have a son (Sam). Baguet started his professional cycling career in 1991. He worked for Lotto for five years and one year for Vlaanderen 2002. His major victories were stages in the Tour du Limousin and the Tour of Britain. After six years pro-cycling, he became a roofer.

In 2000, he made a comeback in the cycling-milieu (again with Lotto) and won the biggest victory in his career: a stage in the Tour de France. In 2005 he won two stages in the Vuelta a Andalucía and became the Belgian national cycling champion. In 2006 and 2007, Baguet rode for the second big Belgian UCI ProTeam: Quick Step-Innergetic. He retired at the end of the 2007 season.

Baguet died on 9 February 2017 after a two-year battle against colon cancer.

== Major results ==
1989
3rd Overall Circuit Franco-Belge
1990
1st Stage 4 GP Tell
2nd Seraing-Aachen-Seraing
4th Gran Premio della Liberazione
4th Circuit des Frontières
6th Grote Prijs Jef Scherens
7th Trophée des Grimpeurs
1991
1st Tour du Nord-Ouest
2nd GP Villafranca de Ordizia
8th GP de la Ville de Rennes
10th Rund um den Henninger Turm
1992
2nd Cholet-Pays de Loire
2nd GP Ouest–France
3rd Overall Tour du Limousin

1st Stage 2

5th Omloop van de Vlaamse Scheldeboorden
7th Brabantse Pijl
8th GP de la Ville de Rennes
1993
1st Stage 2 Kellogg's Tour of Britain
7th Brabantse Pijl
10th La Flèche Wallonne
1994
1st Clásica de Sabiñánigo
1995
4th Grand Prix d'Isbergues
6th Druivenkoers-Overijse
10th Veenendaal–Veenendaal
2000
3rd GP Stad Zottegem
6th Coppa Bernocchi
2001
1st Druivenkoers-Overijse
1st Stage 17 Tour de France
2nd Coppa Sabatini
4th GP Ouest–France
4th Grand Prix de Wallonie
5th Clásica de San Sebastián
5th Cholet-Pays de Loire
6th Kuurne–Brussels–Kuurne
8th Luk-Cup Bühl
9th Overall Tour de Pologne
9th Tour du Haut Var
10th Nokere Koerse
2002
2nd Kuurne–Brussels–Kuurne
3rd Grand Prix Pino Cerami
3rd Trofeo Laigueglia
5th GP Industria & Commercio di Prato
5th GP Stad Zottegem
6th Brabantse Pijl
6th Cholet-Pays de Loire
8th Grote Prijs Jef Scherens
8th GP Ouest–France
9th Coppa Sabatini
2004
2nd GP Ouest–France
2005
1st Road race, National Road Championships
Vuelta a Andalucía

1st Points classification
1st Stages 2 & 3

7th Kuurne–Brussels–Kuurne
