= 1988 Paris–Tours =

Race details
- Dates: 9 October 1988
- Stages: 1
- Distance: 290 km (180.2 mi)
- Winning time: 8h 28' 44"

Results
	Winner	Peter Pieters (NED)	(TVM–Van Schilt)
	Second	Jan Goessens (BEL)	(Lotto–Vlaanderen–Jong–Mbk–Merckx)
	Third	Sean Kelly (IRL)	(Kas–Canal 10)

The 1988 Paris–Tours was the 82nd edition of the Paris–Tours cycle race and was held on 9 October 1988. The race started in Chaville and finished in Tours. The race was won by Peter Pieters of the TVM team.

== General classification ==
Final general classification

Rank	Rider	Team	Time
1	Peter Pieters (NED)	TVM–Van Schilt	8h 28' 44"
2	Jan Goessens (BEL)	Lotto–Vlaanderen–Jong–Mbk–Merckx	+ 0"
3	Sean Kelly (IRL)	Kas–Canal 10	+ 0"
4	Marnix Lameire (BEL)	AD Renting–Anti-M–Bottecchia	+ 0"
5	Gino De Backer (BEL)	AD Renting–Anti-M–Bottecchia	+ 0"
6	Eric Vanderaerden (BEL)	Panasonic–Isostar–Colnago–Agu	+ 0"
7	Wilfried Peeters (BEL)	Sigma–Fina	+ 0"
8	Corneille Daems (BEL)	SEFB–Peugeot–Tönissteiner	+ 0"
9	Jean-Pierre Heynderickx (BEL)	Sigma–Fina	+ 0"
10	Hendrik Redant (BEL)	Isoglass–EVS–Robland	+ 0"
