= Eric De Clercq =

Belgian cyclist (born 1967)

Personal information
- Born: 3 December 1967 (age 58) Opbrakel, Belgium

Cycling career
- Sport: Cycling
- Current team: Retired
- Discipline: Road
- Role: Rider

Professional teams
- 1990: La William–Saltos (stagiaire)
- 1991–1993: La William–Saltos
- 1994–2001: Collstrop
- 2002: Palmans–Collstrop

Eric De Clercq (born 3 December 1967) is a Belgian former road cyclist, who competed as a professional from 1991 to 2002.

== Major results ==
1989
1st De Vlaamse Pijl
3rd Circuit du Hainaut
1990
3rd Omloop van de Westhoek
1991
10th Grand Prix de Cannes
1992
1st Stage 4 Hofbrau Cup
2nd Stadsprijs Geraardsbergen
5th Circuit des Frontières
10th Kampioenschap van Vlaanderen
1993
1st Stage 5 Kellogg's Tour
4th GP Stad Zottegem
8th Kampioenschap van Vlaanderen
1994
1st Circuit des Frontières
9th Nationale Sluitingprijs
1995
2nd Brussel–Ingooigem
1996
1st Rund um Düren
1997
3rd GP Aarhus
1998
1st Zomergem–Adinkerke
6th Overall Circuit Franco-Belge
9th GP Rik Van Steenbergen
1999
8th De Kustpijl
2000
9th Archer Grand Prix
2001
1st Omloop der Kempen
3rd Omloop Mandel-Leie-Schelde
4th Vlaamse Havenpijl
