= Luc Govaerts =

Belgian cyclist

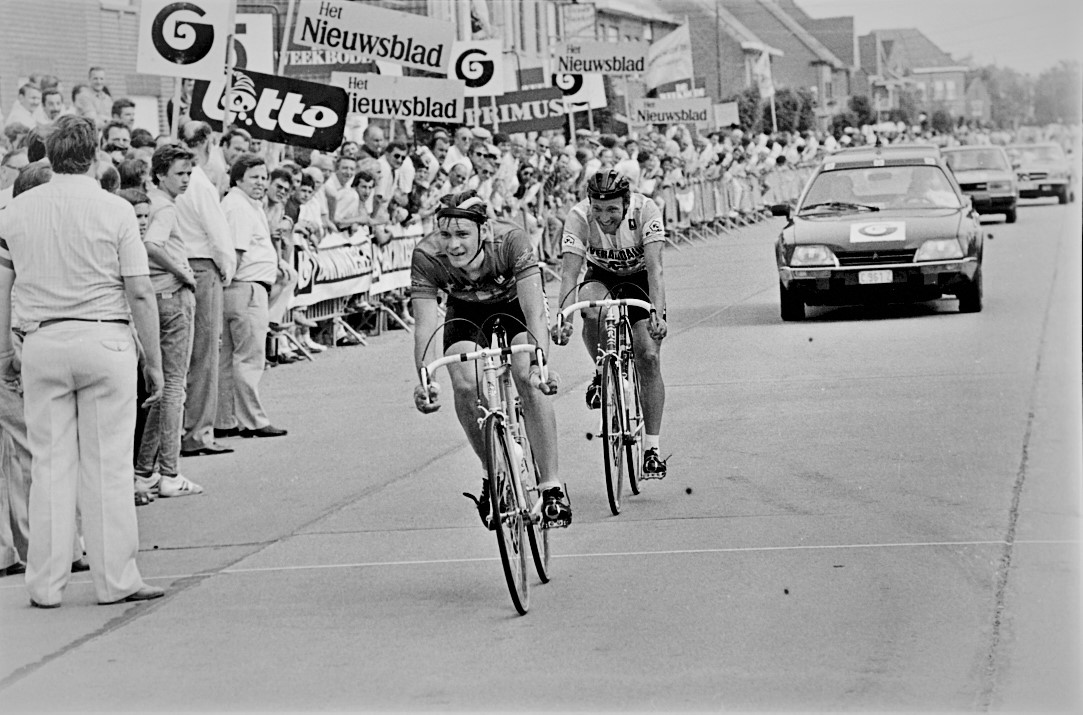
- Govaerts (front) at the 1985 Gullegem Koerse

Personal information
- Born: 25 January 1959 (age 67) Brecht, Belgium

Cycling career
- Sport: Cycling
- Discipline: Road
- Role: Rider

Professional teams
- 1983–1984: Europ Decor
- 1985: Lotto
- 1986: Robland–La Claire Fontaine
- 1987–1989: S.E.F.B.–Gipiemme
- 1990: Westwood

Luc Govaerts (born 25 January 1959) is a Belgian former professional racing cyclist. He rode in the 1984 Tour de France and won the 10th stage of the 1984 Herald Sun Tour.

== Major results ==
1981
1st Madison, National Amateur Track Championships (with Robert Hendrickx)
1984
1st Stage 10 Herald Sun Tour
1985
1st Schaal Sels
1987
1st Overall Circuit Franco–Belge
1st Omloop van het Waasland

=== Classics and Grand Tour results timeline ===
Year	Tour de France	Gent–Wevelgem	Amstel Gold Race	Liège–Bastogne–Liège	Brabantse Pijl
1982					8th
1983			57th	37th	
1984	109th	35th			
1988		54th			
