= Walter Dalgal =

Belgian-Italian cyclist

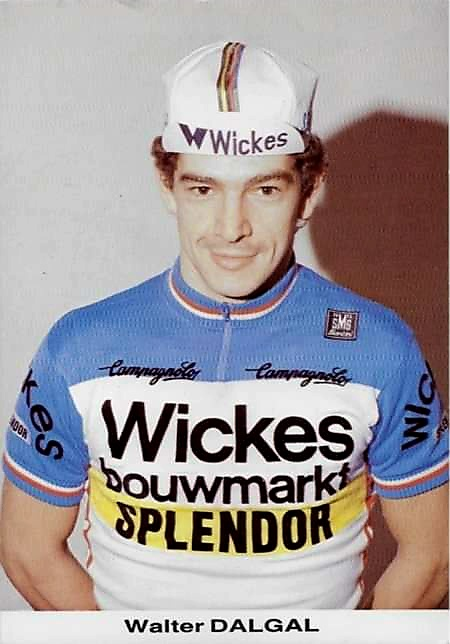
- Walter Dalgal Splendor professional cycling

Personal information
- Born: 24 June 1954 (age 72) Charleroi, Belgium

Cycling career
- Sport: Cycling
- Current team: Road
- Discipline: Road
- Role: Rider

Professional teams
- 1976–1977: Carlos
- 1978: Old Lord's–Splendor–K.S.B.
- 1979: Kas–Campagnolo
- 1980: Marc–Carlos–V.R.D.–Woningbouw
- 1981–1982: Splendor–Wickes Bouwmarkt–Europ Decor
- 1983: Safir–Van de Ven
- 1984–1985: Gis Gelati–Tuc Lu
- 1986: Robland–La Claire Fontaine
- 1987–1988: Sigma
- 1989: S.E.F.B.–Galli

Walter Dalgal (born 24 June 1954 in Charleroi) is a Belgian-Italian former road cyclist. Professional from 1976 to 1989, he won the Grand Prix de Wallonie in 1981 and the Druivenkoers Overijse in 1983.

== Major results ==
1976
8th Druivenkoers Overijse
1977
2nd Circuit des Frontières
7th Omloop van het Zuidwesten
1978
3rd Druivenkoers Overijse
8th Tour du Condroz
1979
2nd Brussels–Ingooigem
3rd Omloop van de Vlaamse Scheldeboorden
6th Ronde van Limburg
8th Circuit des Frontières
1981
1st Grand Prix de Wallonie
2nd GP du Tournaisis
3rd GP Stad Vilvoorde
9th Dwars door België
1982
3rd Druivenkoers Overijse
4th Grand Prix de Fourmies
7th Grand Prix Impanis-Van Petegem
8th Kampioenschap van Vlaanderen
8th GP du Tournaisis
10th Circuit des Frontières
1983
1st Druivenkoers Overijse
1984
5th Omloop van het Houtland
9th GP Victor Standaert
1985
4th GP Industria & Artigianato
1986
3rd Binche–Tournai–Binche
1987
3rd Grand Prix d'Isbergues
1988
7th Bordeaux–Paris
1989
2nd GP de la Ville de Rennes
9th Binche–Tournai–Binche
