= Roger Verplaetse =

Belgian racing cyclist (1931–2023)

Personal information
- Born: 24 October 1931 Sijsele, Belgium
- Died: 6 November 2023 (aged 92)

Cycling career
- Sport: Cycling
- Discipline: Road

Professional teams
- 1955–1956: Plume-Vainqueur
- 1956–1959: Faema–Guerra
- 1960: Wiel's–Flandria

Roger Verplaetse (24 October 1931 – 6 November 2023) was a Belgian racing cyclist.

== Biography ==
Born in Sijsele on 24 October 2023, Verplaetse took part in the Peace Race in 1954. He then became a professional cyclist in 1955, first with Plume-Vainqueur and then with Faema and Flandria. During this time, he won the 1956 of the Nationale Sluitingsprijs as well as various stages of the Tour of the Netherlands and the Volta a la Comunitat Valenciana. He placed second in the 1957 Belgian National Road Race Championships.

Verplaetse died on 6 November 2023, at the age of 92.

== Major results ==
1956
1st Nationale Sluitingsprijs
1st Aalter-Bruxelles
1st Omloop der Vlaamse Gewesten
1st Stage 5 Tour of the Netherlands
1st Memorial Fred De Bruyne
1957
2nd Road race, National Road Championships
2nd Omloop van het Houtland
1958
1st Stages 2 & 3 Volta a la Comunitat Valenciana
