= 1990 Grote Prijs Jef Scherens =

Race details
- Dates: 23 September 1990
- Stages: 1
- Distance: 170 km (110 mi)
- Winning time: 3h 56' 28"

Results
	Winner	Wilfried Peeters (BEL)
	Second	Corneille Daems (BEL)
	Third	Johan Devos (BEL)

The 1990 Grote Prijs Jef Scherens was the 24th edition of the Grote Prijs Jef Scherens cycle race and was held on 23 September 1990. The race started and finished in Leuven. The race was won by Wilfried Peeters.

== General classification ==
Final general classification

Rank	Rider	Time
1	Wilfried Peeters (BEL)	3h 56' 28"
2	Corneille Daems (BEL)	+ 0"
3	Johan Devos (BEL)	+ 22"
4	Herman Frison (BEL)	+ 22"
5	Didier Priem (BEL)	+ 22"
6	Serge Baguet (BEL)	+ 22"
7	Fabrice Naessens (BEL)	+ 22"
8	Rudy Verdonck (BEL)	+ 22"
9	Benjamin Van Itterbeeck (BEL)	+ 22"
10	Guy De Coster (BEL)	+ 22"
