= Benjamin Van Itterbeeck =

Belgian cyclist (born 1964)

Personal information
- Full name: Benjamin Van Itterbeeck
- Born: 16 April 1964 (age 62) Heist-op-den-Berg, Belgium

Cycling career
- Sport: Cycling
- Discipline: Road
- Role: Rider

Professional teams
- 1986–1990: Joker–Emerxil–Merckx
- 1991: Histor–Sigma
- 1992: GB–MG Maglificio
- 1993–1994: Collstrop–Garden Wood
- 1995: Espace Card–Credibel–SEFB

Major wins
- One-day races and Classics National Road Race Championships (1991)

Benjamin Van Itterbeeck (born 16 April 1964) is a Belgian former racing cyclist. He won the Belgian national road race title in 1991.

== Major results ==
1984
1st Stage 9 Vuelta Ciclista de Chile
1986
1st Paris–Troyes
1st Stage 7 (ITT) Ruban Granitier Breton
2nd Tour of Flanders U23
2nd Grote Prijs Marcel Kint
1987
1st Puivelde Koerse
1st Grand Prix Betekom
3rd Overall Tour de Luxembourg
4th Binche–Tournai–Binche
5th Grand Prix Impanis-Van Petegem
1988
1st Individual pursuit, National Track Championships
1st Stage 2 (TTT) Tour de la Communauté Européenne
3rd Omloop Schelde-Durme
4th Overall Tour of Belgium
1989
1st Nationale Sluitingsprijs
1st Stage 4 Tour de la Communauté Européenne
3rd Grand Prix Pino Cerami
9th Overall Tour of Ireland
9th Grand Prix d'Isbergues
1990
1st Omloop Mandel-Leie-Schelde
3rd Trophée des Grimpeurs
9th Grote Prijs Jef Scherens
1991
1st Road race, National Road Championships
1st Stage 3a Tour de Luxembourg
1992
3rd Nokere Koerse
1993
1st Grote Prijs Beeckman-De Caluwé
1st Stage 3b Route du Sud
1st Stage 10 Tour DuPont
9th Paris–Roubaix
1996
1st Road race, National Amateur Road Championships
3rd Overall Tour de Namur

1st Stage 2
