= Jan Bogaert =

Belgian cyclist (1957–2024)

- Bogaert in 1982

Personal information
- Born: 3 December 1957 Temse, Belgium
- Died: 23 January 2024 (aged 66) Bornem, Belgium

Cycling career
- Sport: Cycling
- Discipline: Road
- Role: Rider

Professional teams
- 1980–1981: Mini-Flat–Vermeer Thijs
- 1982–1985: Europ Decor–Dries
- 1986–1987: Transvemij–Van Schilt–Elro
- 1988: Intral Renting–Nec–Ricoh–Merckx
- 1989–1990: La William–Fondua–Euroclean
- 1991: Collstrop–Isoglass
- 1992–1993: Willy Naessens
- 1994: Palmans–Inco Coating
- 1995: Zetelhallen–Ysco

Jan Bogaert (3 December 1957 – 23 January 2024) was a Belgian road racing cyclist.

He was a professional from 1980 to 1995 and won 115 races during that period. His palmares include the E3 Prijs in Harelbeke, the Driedaagse van De Panne and the Scheldeprijs, next to a big amount of stage wins. Throughout his career, he picked up a total of 247 victories.

Bogaert died on 23 January 2024, at the age of 66 after a lingering illness.

== Victories ==
Date	Event	Competition	Location	Country
1978	Prologue	Tour de l'Avenir	Divonne-les-Bains	France
1979		Cinturó de l'Empordà		Spain
1979	Stage 3	Circuit Franco-Belge	Templeuve	Belgium
1979	General Classification	Circuit Franco-Belge		Belgium
1979		Internatie Reningelst		Belgium
1979	Prologue	Tour de l'Avenir	Divonne-les-Bains	France
3 July 1980		Heusden Limburg		Belgium
1981	Stage 2a	Ronde van Nederland	Enter	Netherlands
1981	Prologue (Note: With Adrie van Houwelingen)	Ronde van Nederland	Breda	Netherlands
1981	Stage 6	Tour de Suisse	Geneva	Switzerland
1981	General Classification	Three Days of De Panne		Belgium
1981		Nationale Sluitingsprijs	Putte–Kapellen	Belgium
1981		Grand Prix d'Ouverture La Marseillaise		France
1982		Schaal Sels-Merksem		
1982	Stage 2	Herald Sun Tour		Australia
1982	Stage 3	Herald Sun Tour		Australia
1982		E3 Harelbeke	Harelbeke	Belgium
1983		Omloop Hageland-Zuiderkempen	Begijnendijk	Belgium
1983		Scheldeprijs		Belgium
1984		Nokere Koerse		Belgium
1984	Stage 3	Tour of Belgium	Hasselt	Belgium
1985	Stage 3	Herald Sun Tour		Australia
1985	Stage 7	Herald Sun Tour		Australia
1985	Stage 11	Herald Sun Tour		Australia
1985		Grote 1-MeiPrijs		Belgium
1986	Stage 2	Herald Sun Tour		Australia
1986	Stage 4	Herald Sun Tour		Australia
1986	Stage 7	Herald Sun Tour		Australia
1986	Stage 12	Herald Sun Tour		Australia
1986	Stage 17	Herald Sun Tour		Australia
1987	Stage 2	Herald Sun Tour		Australia
1987	Stage 3	Herald Sun Tour		Australia
1987	Stage 8	Herald Sun Tour		Australia
1987	Stage 10	Herald Sun Tour		Australia
1987	Stage 16	Herald Sun Tour		Australia
1988	Stage 2	Herald Sun Tour		Australia
1988	Stage 15	Herald Sun Tour		Australia
1988		GP Stad Vilvoorde		Belgium
1988		Grote 1-MeiPrijs		Belgium
1989		Flèche Hesbignonne		Belgium
1989		Grand Prix de Rennes		France
1989		Omloop van de Vlaamse Scheldeboorden		Belgium
1989	Stage 3	Bayern Rundfahrt		Germany
1989	Stage 1	Herald Sun Tour		Australia
1989	Stage 3	Herald Sun Tour		Australia
1989	Stage 6	Herald Sun Tour		Australia
1989		Omloop van het Houtland	Lichtervelde	Belgium
1990	Stage 5b	Milk Race	Birmingham	United Kingdom
1990	Stage 2	Milk Race	Weston-super-Mare	United Kingdom
1990	Stage 9	Milk Race	Carlisle	United Kingdom
1990	Stage 10	Milk Race	Morecambe	United Kingdom
1990	Stage 12	Milk Race	Liverpool	United Kingdom
1990	Prologue	Bayern Rundfahrt		Germany
1990	Stage 1	Herald Sun Tour	Bicheno	Australia
1990	Stage 2	Herald Sun Tour	Launceston	Australia
1990	Stage 4b	Herald Sun Tour	Ballarat	Australia
1990	Stage 5b	Herald Sun Tour	Echuca	Australia
1990	Stage 6a	Herald Sun Tour	Cobram	Australia
1991	Stage 1b	Milk Race	Kingston upon Hull	United Kingdom
1991		Belsele–Puivelde		Belgium
1992		Grote 1-MeiPrijs		Belgium
1992		Omloop van de Vlasstreek		Belgium
1993	Stage 9	Herald Sun Tour	Marysville	Australia
1994		Omloop van het Waasland	Kemzeke–Waas	Belgium
