= Hendrik Redant =

Belgian racing cyclist

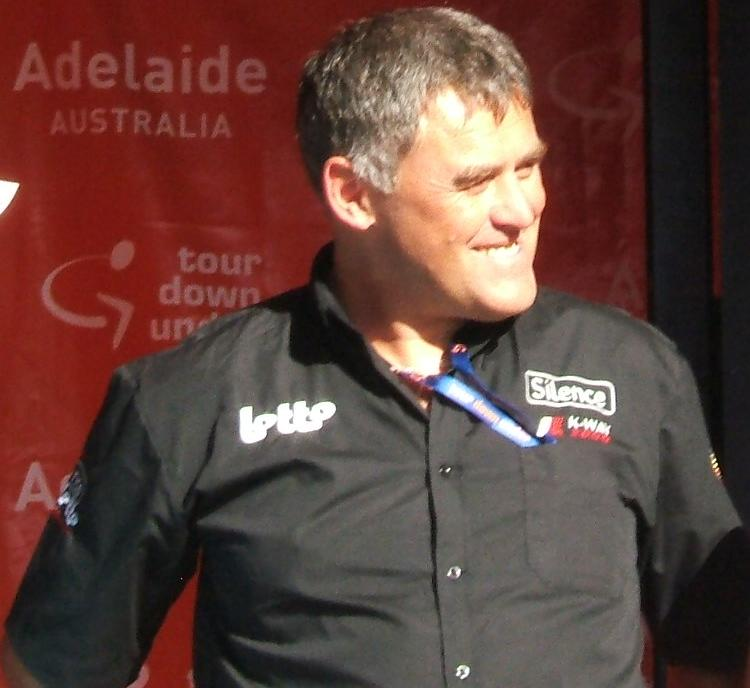
- Redant at the 2009 Tour Down Under team presentation

Personal information
- Full name: Hendrik Redant
- Born: 1 November 1962 (age 63) Ninove, Belgium

Cycling career
- Sport: Cycling
- Current team: Human Powered Health
- Discipline: Road
- Role: Rider; Directeur sportif

Professional team
- 1987–1988: Robland–Isoglass
- 1989–1992: Lotto–Vlaanderen–Jong–Mbk–Merckx
- 1993: Collstrop–Assur Carpets
- 1994: ZG Mobili
- 1995–1997: TVM–Polis Direct

Managerial teams
- 1997–2000: TVM–Farm Frites
- 2001–2002: Domo–Farm Frites–Latexco
- 2003–2010: Lotto–Domo
- 2012–2018: UnitedHealthcare
- 2019–2021: Team Dimension Data
- 2022–: Human Powered Health

Major wins
- Grand Tours Vuelta a España Sprints classification (1993) Stage races Tour de Picardie (1990) One-day races and Classics Kuurne–Brussels–Kuurne (1988, 1990) Brussels–Ingooigem (1989) Kampioenschap van Vlaanderen (1990) Paris–Tours (1992

Hendrik Redant (born 1 November 1962) is a Belgian former professional cyclist. He was a directeur sportif with the Omega Pharma–Lotto cycling team until the end of the 2010 season. For 2011 he left Omega Pharma–Lotto to take up a position with the Australian Pegasus Sports Racing team. The team folded before making its debut. He currently works as a directeur sportif for UCI ProTeam Human Powered Health.

== Major results ==
1984
1st Stage 4 Ronde van Brabant
1987
1st Omloop van het Houtland
2nd Dwars door West-Vlaanderen
1988
1st Stage 4 Tour of Belgium
1st Stage 3 Driedaagse van De Panne
1st Kuurne–Brussels–Kuurne
1st Zele-Puivelde
2nd Ruddervoorde Koerse
1989
1st Brussel–Ingooigem
1st GP Fina-Fayt-le-Franc
2nd Tour de Midi-Pyrénées
3rd GP de Fourmies
3rd Tour de la Haute-Sambre
3rd GP Stad Sint-Niklaas
3rd GP Frans Melckenbeek
1990
1st Overall Tour de l'Oise
1st Kuurne–Brussels–Kuurne
1st GP Fina-Fayt-le-Franc
1st Kampioenschap van Vlaanderen-Koolskamp
1st GP de la Haute Sambre
1st Stage 4b Circuit de la Sarthe
1st Merbes-Le-Chateau
2nd Nationale Sluitingsprijs
3rd Flèche Hesbignonne
3rd Grand Prix du Morbihan
3rd Grand Prix La Marseillaise
3rd Grand Prix de Bessèges
10th Overall Circuit de la Sarthe

1st Stage 5

1991
1st Dwars door West-Vlaanderen
1st Izegem Koers
1st Omloop van de Vlasstreek-Heule
1st Points classification, Tour of Britain
1st Stage 1 Vuelta a Aragón
2nd Brussel–Ingooigem
3rd Tour of Leuven
3rd Kuurne–Brussels–Kuurne
3rd Le Samyn
1992
1st Paris–Tours
1st Stadsprijs Geraardsbergen
1st Stage 6 Vuelta a Andalucía
1st Tour of Leuven
1st Japan Cup
1st Stage 4 Vuelta a los Valles Mineros
1st Stage 1 Boland Bank Tour
2nd Arnhem–Veenendaal Classic
3rd Overall Tour of Britain

1st Stages 1 & 5

3rd Kampioenschap van Vlaanderen
3rd GP Stad Zottegem
3rd Omloop Schelde-Durme
1993
1st Stage 1 Route du Sud
2nd Overall Tour d'Armorique

1st Points classification
1st Stage 4

1st Moorsele
1st Portsmouth
1st Sprints Vuelta a España
1st Sprints Étoile de Bessèges
2nd Ronde van Limburg
3rd Textielprijs Vichte
3rd Omloop Schelde-Durme
1994
1st GP Briek Schotte
1st Stage 2 Boland Bank Tour
1st Strand Classic
1st Erembodegem
1st Aalst
1st Kortemark
1st Desselgem
2nd Kampioenschap van Vlaanderen-Koolskamp
2nd Acht van Chaam
2nd Omloop van de Westkust
1995
1st Omloop van het Waasland-Kemzeke
1st Grote Prijs Stad Zottegem
1st Stage 4 Boland Bank Tour
2nd Kuurne–Brussels–Kuurne
1996
1st GP Gemeente Kortemark
1st Stage 6 Tour of Portugal
2nd Omloop Het Volk
3rd Dwars door West-Vlaanderen
1997
1st Wanzele
