= Jerry Cooman =

Belgian cyclist

Personal information
- Born: 6 January 1966 (age 60) Ninove, Belgium

Cycling career
- Sport: Cycling
- Current team: Retired
- Discipline: Road
- Role: Rider

Professional teams
- 1987–1991: S.E.F.B.–Gipiemme
- 1991–1992: Tulip Computers
- 1993: Trident–Schick–Gilals–Wimi
- 1994: Palmans–Renault–Inco

Jerry Cooman (born 6 January 1966) is a Belgian former professional road cyclist. He retired in 1994.

== Major results ==
1988
1st Nationale Sluitingsprijs
4th Circuit des Frontières
1989
1st Ronde van Limburg
3rd Le Samyn
1990
1st GP Stad Vilvoorde
1991
1st Stages 11 & 12 Milk Race
1st Stage 4 Tour of Sweden
1st Rund um Köln
1st Clásica de Sabiñánigo
1st Omloop van het Waasland
4th Grote Prijs Jef Scherens
1992
2nd Clásica de Sabiñánigo
