= Circuit des Frontières =

Cycling race

Race details
- English name: Circuit of the Borders
- Discipline: Road
- Type: One-day race

History
- First edition: 1964
- Final edition: 1995
- First winner: Jean Stablinski (FRA)
- Final winner: Frank van Veenendaal (NED)

The Circuit des Frontières was a one-day road cycling race held annually in Belgium from 1964 until 1995.

== Winners ==
Year	Winner	Second	Third
1964	(France) Jean Stablinski	(United Kingdom) Barry Hoban	(Belgium) Jaak De Boever
1965	(Belgium) André Noyelle	(Belgium) Arthur Decabooter	(Belgium) Norbert Kerckhove
1966	(Belgium) Eddy Merckx	(Belgium) Alfons De Bal	(Belgium) Herman Van Springel
1967	(Belgium) Edward Sels	(Belgium) Georges Van Coningsloo	(Belgium) Martin Van Den Bossche
1968	(Belgium) Guido Reybrouck	(Belgium) Roger Kindt	(Netherlands) Jan Harings
1969	(Belgium) Daniel Van Ryckeghem	(Belgium) Fernand Hermie	(Belgium) Lucien Van Impe
1970	(Belgium) Noël Vantyghem	(United Kingdom) Barry Hoban	(France) José Catieau
1971	(Belgium) Christian Callens	(Belgium) Paul Aerts	(United Kingdom) William Bilsland
1972	(Belgium) Noël Vantyghem	(Belgium) Paul Aerts	(Belgium) Gérard Hendrickx
1973	(Netherlands) Cees Bal	(Belgium) Jean-Pierre Berckmans	(Belgium) Karel Rottiers
1974	(Belgium) Dirk Baert	(Belgium) Christian Debuysschere	(Netherlands) Theo van der Leeuw
1975	(Belgium) Eric Van de Wiele	(Netherlands) Roy Schuiten	(France) Sylvain Vasseur
1976	(Belgium) Wim Schroyens	(Belgium) Antoon Houbrechts	(Belgium) Christian Debuysschere
1977	(Belgium) Marc Demeyer	(Italy) Walter Dalgal	(Belgium) José De Cauwer
1978	(Belgium) Jean-Luc Vandenbroucke	(Belgium) Frans Verhaegen	(Italy) Maurizio Bellet
1979	(Belgium) Walter Godefroot	(Belgium) Marc Renier	(Belgium) Rudy Pevenage
1980	(Belgium) Marc Demeyer	(Belgium) Alfons De Wolf	(Belgium) Etienne De Wilde
1981	(Belgium) Alfons De Wolf	(Belgium) Frank Hoste	(Belgium) Marc Sergeant
1982	(Belgium) Willy Teirlinck	(Belgium) Noël Segers	(Belgium) Leo Van Thielen
1983	(Belgium) Kenny De Maerteleire	(Belgium) Jean-Marie Wampers	(Belgium) Rudy Delehouze
1984	(Belgium) Etienne De Wilde	(Belgium) Rudy Delehouze	(Belgium) Eddy Vanhaerens
1985	(Netherlands) Henri Manders	(Belgium) William Tackaert	(France) Thierry Barrault
1986	(Denmark) Brian Holm	(Netherlands) Theo de Rooij	(Belgium) Johan Capiot
1987	(Australia) Allan Peiper	(Belgium) Jan Nevens	(Netherlands) Anjo van Loon
1988	(Belgium) Gino Debacker	(Belgium) Carl Roes	(Belgium) Marc Fruch
1989	(Belgium) Patrick Deneut	(Belgium) Roger Rogiers	(Belgium) Ludo Peeters
1990	(Belgium) Etienne De Wilde	(Belgium) Dirk De Wolf	(Belgium) Daniel Beelen
1991	(Belgium) Frank Van Den Abeele	(Netherlands) Patrick Tolhoek	(Netherlands) Jelle Nijdam
1992	(Belgium) Bart Leysen	(Belgium) Jan Mattheus	(Belgium) Didier Priem
1993	(Netherlands) Rob Mulders	(Netherlands) Frans Maassen	(Belgium) Frank Van Den Abeele
1994	(Belgium) Eric De Clercq	(Belgium) Marc Streel	(Belgium) Marc Wauters
1995	(Netherlands) Frank van Veenendaal	(Belgium) Erwin Thijs	(Belgium) Nico Emonds
