= Hans De Meester =

Belgian cyclist

Personal information
- Born: 7 August 1970 (age 56) Aalst, Belgium

Cycling career
- Sport: Cycling
- Current team: Retired
- Discipline: Road
- Role: Rider

Amateur team
- 1992: Tulip Computers (stagiaire)

Professional teams
- 1993: Willy Naessens
- 1994–1997: Palmans–Inco Coating
- 1998: Tönissteiner–Colnago
- 1999: Gerolsteiner
- 2000: Collstrop–De Federale Verzekeringen
- 2001–2002: Collstrop–Palmans

Hans De Meester (born 7 August 1970) is a Belgian former cyclist.

== Major results ==
1995
1st Stage 2 Bayern-Rundfahrt
1996
1st Le Samyn
2nd Memorial Rik Van Steenbergen
3rd Grote 1-MeiPrijs
1998
1st Stage 1 OZ Wielerweekend
2nd Dwars door Gendringen
3rd Hel van het Mergelland
3rd Overall Driedaagse van West-Vlaanderen
3rd De Kustpijl
3rd Zellik–Galmaarden
1999
3rd Omloop van het Houtland
2003
1st Internationale Wielertrofee Jong Maar Moedig
1st Antwerpse Havenpijl
2nd De Vlaamse Pijl
2004
2nd Internationale Wielertrofee Jong Maar Moedig
