= S.E.F.B (cycling team) =

Belgian cycling team

S.E.F.B.
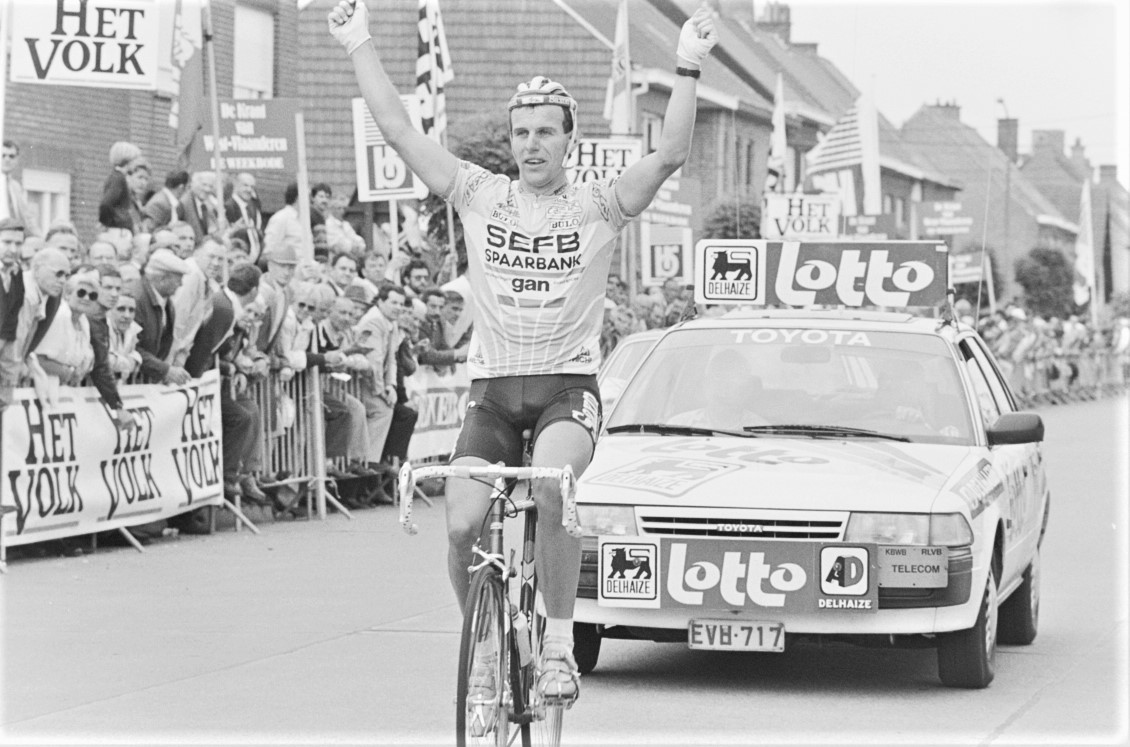
- Johan Devos winning the Gullegem Koerse in 1990

Team information
- Registered: Belgium
- Founded: 1987
- Disbanded: 1991
- Discipline: Road
- Bicycles: Moser (1989); Peugeot (1988); Daccordi (1989); LOOK (1990–1991)

Key personnel
- General manager: Ferdinand Bracke (1987–1988); Gérard Bulens (1989–1991)

Team name history
- 1987 1988 1989 1990–1991: S.E.F.B.–Gipiemme; S.E.F.B.–Peugeot–Tönissteiner; S.E.F.B.–Galli–Vlan–Bulo–Opel; S.E.F.B.–Saxon–Gan
S.E.F.B jersey
Jersey

S.E.F.B. was a Belgian professional cycling team that existed from 1987 to 1991.

The main sponsor of the team was the Belgian savings bank S.E.F.B.

== Doping ==
In 1991 Jerry Cooman failed two doping controls in The Milk Race following his wins in Stage 11 and 12. He was disqualified from his wins.

== Final roster (1991) ==
Rider	Date of birth
Daniel Beelen (BEL)	5 July 1966 (aged 25)
Jerry Cooman (BEL)	6 January 1966 (aged 25)
Danny De Bie (BEL)	23 January 1960 (aged 31)
Paul De Brauwer (BEL)	7 June 1956 (aged 35)
Johan Devos (BEL)	10 May 1966 (aged 25)
Jean-Pierre Dubois (BEL)	1 July 1969 (aged 22)
Bruno Geuens (BEL)	20 October 1963 (aged 28)
Paul Haghedooren (BEL)	11 October 1959 (aged 32)
Dirk Heirweg (BEL)	24 September 1955 (aged 36)
Benny Heylen (BEL)	20 September 1962 (aged 29)
Marc Janssens (BEL)	13 November 1968 (aged 23)

Rider	Date of birth
Wim Lambrechts (BEL)	9 February 1967 (aged 24)
Marnix Lameire (BEL)	3 March 1955 (aged 36)
Peter Spaenhoven (BEL)	18 March 1963 (aged 28)
Andrei Tchmil (URS)	22 January 1963 (aged 28)
Frank Van Bakel (NED)	4 December 1958 (aged 33)
Koen Vekemans (BEL)	18 November 1966 (aged 25)
Benny Van Brabant (BEL)	8 May 1959 (aged 32)
Mark Verbeeck (BEL)	3 January 1965 (aged 26)
Wim Vervoort (BEL)	3 September 1969 (aged 22)
Rudy Vingerhoets (BEL)	24 March 1965 (aged 26)
Jan Wijnants (BEL)	8 September 1958 (aged 33)

== Notable riders ==
- (Belgium) René Martens (1987)
- (Belgium) Johan Bruyneel (1987–1989)
- (Belgium) Johan Devos (1990–1991)
- (Belgium) Dirk Heirweg (1991)
- (Belgium) Paul Haghedooren (1991)
- (Soviet Union) Andreï Tchmil (1991)
