= Marnix Lameire =

Belgian cyclist

Personal information
- Born: 3 March 1955 (age 71) Knokke, Belgium

Cycling career
- Sport: Cycling
- Current team: Retired
- Discipline: Road
- Role: Rider

Professional teams
- 1987–1989: AD Renting–Fangio–IOC–MBK
- 1990–1991: S.E.F.B.–Saxon–Gan
- 1992: C.B. Sport–Benny

Marnix Lameire (born 3 March 1955) is a Belgian former professional road cyclist. He most notably won a stage of the 1989 Vuelta a España and the Kampioenschap van Vlaanderen in 1988.

== Major results ==
1987
1st De Kustpijl
1st Stage 2 Vuelta a Aragón
1st Gullegem Koerse
3rd Scheldeprijs
1988
1st Kampioenschap van Vlaanderen
1st Stages 1 & 3 Vuelta a Burgos
3rd Tour de Vendée
3rd Brussels–Ingooigem
3rd Paris–Brussels
4th Paris–Tours
1989
1st Stages 2 & 6 Vuelta a Aragón
1st Stage 1 Vuelta a España
2nd Nationale Sluitingsprijs
1990
1st De Kustpijl
1991
1st Grote Prijs Marcel Kint
