= Frans Cools =

Belgian cyclist

Personal information
- Born: 17 February 1918 Crayford, London, England
- Died: 3 September 1999 (aged 81) Aartselaar, Belgium

Cycling career
- Sport: Cycling

Frans Cools (17 February 1918 – 3 September 1999) was a Belgian cyclist. He competed in three events at the 1936 Summer Olympics.
