= Ronde van Limburg (Belgium) =

Belgian one-day road cycling race

Tour of Limburg

Race details
- Date: Mid April
- Region: Limburg, Belgium
- English name: Tour of Limburg
- Local name: Ronde van Limburg (in Dutch)
- Discipline: Road
- Competition: UCI Europe Tour
- Type: One-day race
- Organiser: Flanders Classics
- Web site: www.rondevanlimburg.be

History
- First edition: 1919
- Editions: 78 (as of 2026)
- First winner: Henri Moerenhout (BEL)
- Most wins: 7 riders with 2 wins (Note: The two-time winners are Belgian riders Jozef Abelshausen, Ernest Sterckx, Guido Van Sweevelt, Eric Vanderaerden, Willy Vannitsen and Tim Merlier, along with Mathieu van der Poel from the Netherlands.)
- Most recent: Tim Merlier (BEL)

The Ronde van Limburg is a European single-day cycle race held in the Belgian region of Limburg, focused on the host cities of Tongeren-Borgloon and Hasselt. The current profile is generally flat, interspersed with a few step climbs and cobbled sectors over a distance of roughly 180 kilometres (110 mi).

The race was first organised in 1919 and remained on the calendar until 1994, with the course typically in and around the city of Sint-Truiden. In 2012, the Ronde van Limburg was revived as a 1.2 event on the UCI Europe Tour, with the host city now Tongeren. In 2014, the event upgraded to the 1.1 classification, with plans to continue expanding to a 1.Pro event in the future.

Traditionally held on Whit Monday in late May or early June, Ronde van Limburg became a mid-week April event in 2025, under race organizer Flanders Classics. This new competition date between Paris-Roubaix and Brabantse Pijl made the race part of the Spring Classics calendar, providing an extra day of competition for cobbles specialists, with the intention of also becoming a "stepping stone" toward Amstel Gold the following weekend.

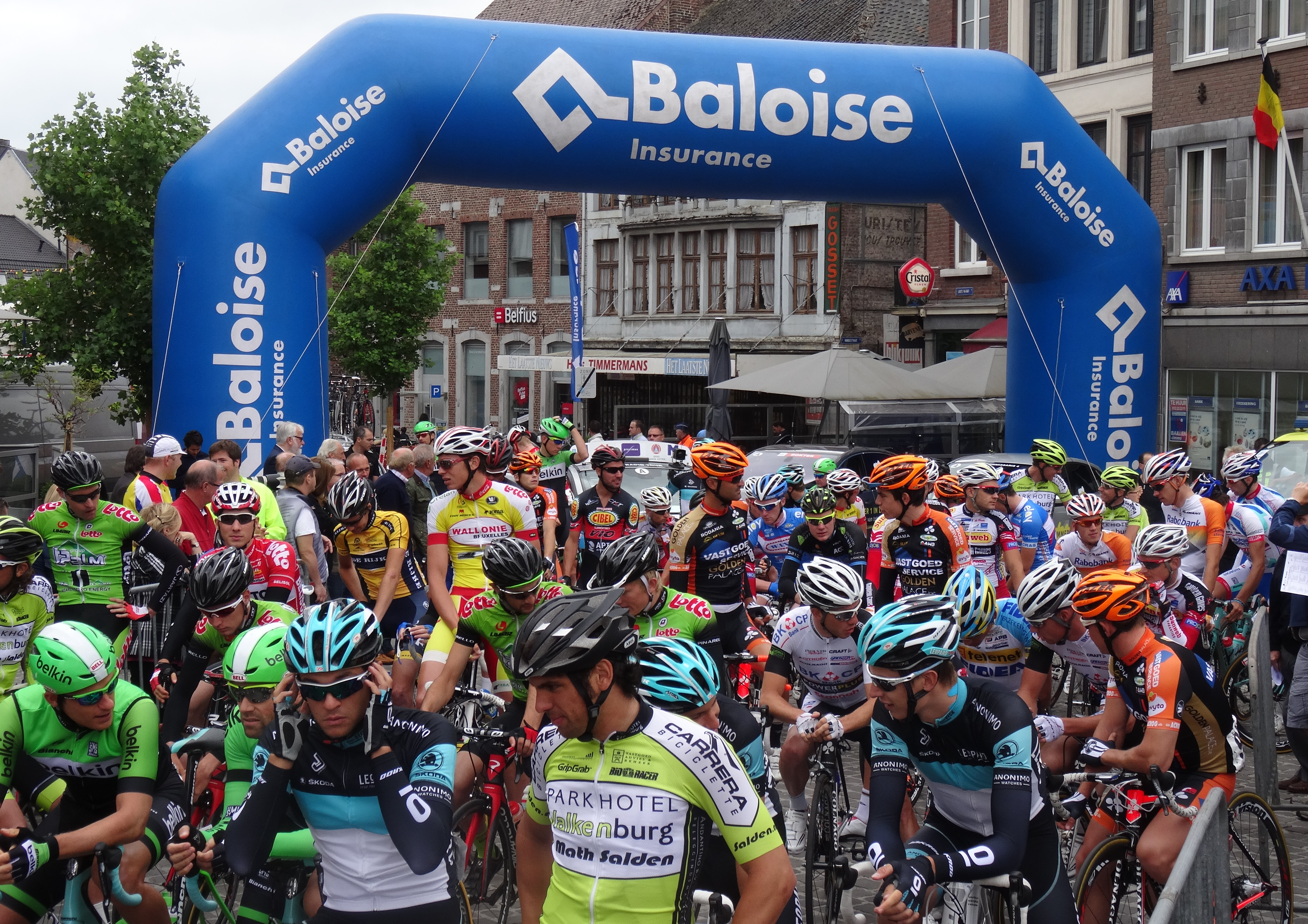
Ronde van Limburg, 15 juni 2014: departure in Tongeren

== Winners ==
Year	Country	Rider	Team
1919	Belgium	Henri Moerenhout	
1920	Belgium	Victor Lenaers	
1921– 1928	No race		
1929	Belgium	Evrard Bourguignon	
1930	Belgium	Louis Hardiquest	
1931	Belgium	Edward Huyghens	
1932	No race		
1933	Belgium	Frans Bonduel	Dilecta–Wolber
1934	Belgium	Louis Roels	Van Hauwaert
1935	Belgium	Frans Van Hassel	Génial Lucifer–Hutchinson
1936	Belgium	Michel D'Hooghe	Van Hauwaert
1937	Belgium	Alphonse Schepers	Colin–Wolber
1938	Belgium	Joseph Huts	Labor
1939	Belgium	Frans Spiessens	Helyett–Hutchinson
1940	No race		
1941	Belgium	Albert Dubuisson	Helyett–Hutchinson
1942	Belgium	Gustaaf Van Overloop	Alcyon–Dunlop
1943	Belgium	Marcel Kint	Mercier–Hutchinson
1944	Belgium	Ernest Sterckx	A. Trialoux–Wolber
1945	Belgium	Éloi Meulenberg	Alcyon–Dunlop
1946	Belgium	Edward Van Dijck	Roberty
1947	Belgium	Georges Claes	Thompson
1948	Belgium	Karel Leysen	L'Express
1949	Belgium	Rik Van Steenbergen	Mercier–Hutchinson
1950	Belgium	Jean Bogaerts	Ruche–Dunlop
1951	Belgium	Henri Serin	Garin–Wolber
1952	Belgium	Roger De Corte	Groene Leeuw
1953	Belgium	Gaston De Wachter	L'Express
1954	Belgium	Edward Peeters	Peugeot–Dunlop
1955	Belgium	Ernest Sterckx	L'Avenir
1956	Belgium	Frans Schoubben	Elvé–Peugeot
1957	Belgium	Willy Vannitsen	Peugeot–BP–Dunlop
1958	Belgium	Roger Baens	Cureghem Sportif
1959	Belgium	Valère Paulissen	Mercier–BP–Hutchinson
1960	Belgium	Willy Vannitsen	Carpano
1961	Belgium	Martin Van Geneugden	Carpano
1962	Netherlands	Peter Post	Flandria–Faema–Clément
1963	Belgium	Joseph Wouters	Solo–Terrot
1964	Belgium	Jos Dewit	Pelforth–Sauvage–Lejeune
1965	Belgium	Georges Van Coningsloo	Peugeot–BP–Michelin
1966	Belgium	Fernand Deferm	Dr. Mann–Grundig
1967	Belgium	Edward Sels	Flandria–De Clerck
1968	Netherlands	Leo Duyndam	Smith's
1969	Belgium	Willy Vekemans	Goldor
1970	Netherlands	Jan van Katwijk	Willem II–Gazelle
1971	No race		
1972	Belgium	Jozef Abelshausen	Watney–Avia
1973	Belgium	Jozef Abelshausen	IJsboerke–Bertin
1974	Belgium	Frans Verbeeck	Watney–Maes Pils
1975	Belgium	Guido Van Sweevelt	Maes Pils–Watney
1976	Belgium	Frans Van Looy	Molteni–Campagnolo
1977	Belgium	Marcel Laurens	IJsboerke–Colnago
1978	Belgium	Willem Peeters	IJsboerke–Gios
1979	Belgium	Guido Van Sweevelt	IJsboerke–Warncke Eis
1980	Belgium	Daniel Willems	IJsboerke–Warncke Eis
1981	Belgium	Ludwig Wijnants	Capri Sonne–Koga Miyata
1982	Belgium	Werner Devos	Boule d'Or–Sunair
1983	Belgium	Rudy Matthijs	Boule d'Or–Colnago
1984	Belgium	Noël De Jonckheere	Teka
1985	Belgium	Eric Vanderaerden	Panasonic–Raleigh
1986	Netherlands	Ad Wijnands	Kwantum–Decosol–Yoko
1987	Belgium	Wim Arras	PDM–Ultima–Concorde
1988	Belgium	Eric Vanderaerden	Panasonic–Isostar–Colnago–Agu
1989	Belgium	Jerry Cooman	S.E.F.B.
1990	Belgium	Eddy Planckaert	Panasonic–Sportlife
1991	No race		
1992	Netherlands	Jans Koerts	PDM–Ultima–Concorde
1993	Belgium	Patrick Van Roosbroeck	La William–Duvel
1994	Belgium	Marc Wauters	WordPerfect–Colnago–Decca
1995– 2011	No race		
2012	Belgium	Kevin Claeys	Landbouwkrediet–Euphony
2013	Belgium	Olivier Chevalier	Wallonie-Bruxelles
2014	Netherlands	Mathieu van der Poel	BKCP–Powerplus
2015	Belgium	Björn Leukemans	Wanty–Groupe Gobert
2016	Belgium	Kenny Dehaes	Wanty–Groupe Gobert
2017	Belgium	Wout van Aert	Vérandas Willems–Crelan
2018	Netherlands	Mathieu van der Poel	Corendon–Circus
2019	Romania	Eduard-Michael Grosu	Delko–Marseille Provence
2020	No race due to COVID-19 pandemic in Belgium		
2021	Belgium	Tim Merlier	Alpecin–Fenix
2022	Belgium	Arnaud De Lie	Lotto–Soudal
2023	Belgium	Gerben Thijssen	Intermarché–Circus–Wanty
2024	Netherlands	Dylan Groenewegen	Team Jayco–AlUla
2025	Belgium	Milan Fretin	Cofidis
2026	Belgium	Tim Merlier	Soudal–Quick-Step
