= Benjamin Verraes =

Belgian cyclist

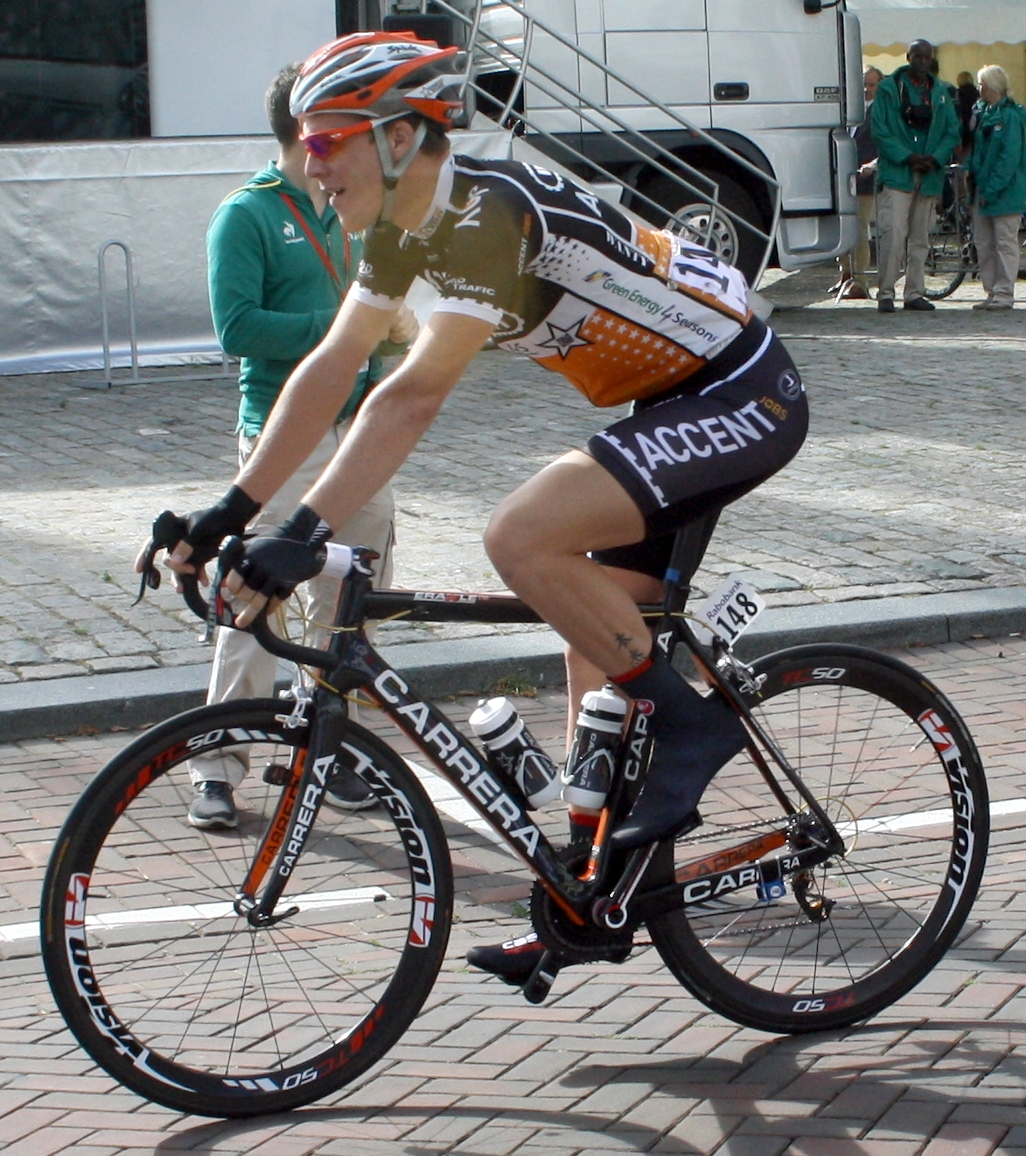
- Verraes at the 2013 World Ports Classic

Personal information
- Born: 21 February 1987 (age 39) Menin, Belgium

Cycling career
- Sport: Cycling
- Current team: Projectbouw Borgonjon–Pessemier NV
- Discipline: Road
- Role: Rider

Amateur teams
- 2012: Accent.jobs–Willems Veranda's (stagiaire)
- 2014: Josan–To Win
- 2017–2019: VDM Van Durme–Michiels–Trawobo CT
- 2020–: Borgonjon–Dewasport

Professional teams
- 2010–2012: Jong Vlaanderen–Bauknecht
- 2013: Accent Jobs–Wanty
- 2015–2016: Cibel

Benjamin Verraes (born 21 February 1987 in Menin) is a Belgian cyclist, who rides for Belgian amateur team Projectbouw Borgonjon–Pessemier NV.

== Major results ==
2010
2nd Overall Tour du Loir-et-Cher
3rd Val d'Ille U Classic 35
5th Kattekoers
9th Grote Prijs Stad Geel
9th Memorial Rik Van Steenbergen
2011
1st Gooikse Pijl
2nd Kattekoers
5th Memorial Van Coningsloo
6th Overall Le Triptyque des Monts et Châteaux
6th Nokere Koerse
7th Grand Prix de la ville de Pérenchies
2012
2nd Memorial Van Coningsloo
3rd Val d'Ille U Classic 35
3rd Grote Prijs Stad Geel
4th Kattekoers
6th Grand Prix de la ville de Pérenchies
6th De Kustpijl
10th Overall Le Triptyque des Monts et Châteaux
10th Overall World Ports Classic
2014
1st Time trial, National Amateur Road Championships
2015
9th Ronde van Limburg
2016
9th Ronde van Overijssel
