= René Mertens =

Belgian cyclist

Personal information
- Born: 3 March 1922 Arendonk, Belgium
- Died: 9 April 2014 (aged 92) Belgium

Cycling career
- Sport: Cycling
- Role: Rider

René Mertens (3 March 1922 – 9 April 2014) was a Belgian racing cyclist. He rode in the 1948 Tour de France.
