= Frank Verleyen =

Belgian cyclist

Personal information
- Born: 26 February 1963 Antwerp, Belgium
- Died: 28 May 2019 (aged 56)

Cycling career
- Sport: Cycling

Frank Verleyen (26 February 1963 – 28 May 2019) was a Belgian cyclist. He competed in the individual road race event at the 1984 Summer Olympics.
