= Eddy Cael =

Belgian cyclist

Personal information
- Born: 25 October 1945 (age 80)

Cycling career
- Sport: Cycling
- Role: Rider

Eddy Cael (born 24 October 1945) is a Belgian racing cyclist. He is most notable for having taken part in the 1974 Tour de France.
