= Omloop van de Vlaamse Scheldeboorden =

Race details
- Date: Late September - Early October
- Region: East Flanders, Belgium
- Local name(s): Omloop van de Vlaamse Scheldeboorden (in Dutch)
- Discipline: Road
- Competition: UCI Europe Tour
- Type: Single-day

History
- First edition: 1969
- Editions: 34 (as of 2008)
- First winner: Willy In't Ven (BEL)
- Most recent: Wouter Weylandt (BEL)

Omloop van de Vlaamse Scheldeboorden is a single-day road bicycle race held annually in September in the municipality of Kruibeke, Belgium. Since 2005, the race is organized as a 1.1 event on the UCI Europe Tour.

== Winners ==
Year	Country	Rider	Team
1969	Belgium	Willy In't Ven	
1970	Belgium	Jaak Clauwaert	
1971	Colombia	Giovany Jiménez Ocampo	
1972	Belgium	Arthur Van De Vijver	
1973	Belgium	Ronny Van De Vijver	
1974	Belgium	Willy Planckaert	
1975	Belgium	Dirk Baert	
1976	Belgium	Ludo Peeters	
1977	Belgium	Alfons De Bal	
1978	Belgium	Alfons De Bal	
1979	Belgium	Dirk Heirweg	
1980	Belgium	Gérard Blockx	
1981	Belgium	Walter Schoonjans	
1982	Belgium	Walter Schoonjans	
1983- 1988	No race		
1989	Belgium	Jan Bogaert	
1990	Netherlands	Adri van der Poel	
1991	Belgium	Danny Neskens	
1992	Belgium	Ludo Giesberts	
1993	Belgium	Nico Eeckhout	
1994	Belgium	Nico Emonds	
1995	Belgium	Wilfried Nelissen	
1996	Belgium	Rudy Verdonck	
1997	Belgium	Franky Van Haesebroucke	
1998	Belgium	Gert Vanderaerden	
1999	Belgium	Geert Omloop	
2000	Italy	Giampaolo Mondini	
2001	Slovenia	Martin Hvastija	
2002	Netherlands	Stefan van Dijk	
2003	Belgium	Chris Peers	
2004	Netherlands	Stefan van Dijk	
2005	Belgium	Nico Eeckhout	
2006	Germany	Danilo Hondo	Team Lamonta
2007	Netherlands	Steven de Jongh	
2008	Belgium	Wouter Weylandt	
