= La William (cycling team) =

Team information
- Registered: Belgium
- Founded: 1989
- Disbanded: 1993
- Discipline: Road

Key personnel
- General manager: Paul De Baeremaecker; Rudy Pevenage

Team name history
- 1989 1990–1991 1992–1993: La William–Tönissteiner; La William-Saltos; La William–Duvel
La William jersey
Jersey

La William was a Belgian professional cycling team that existed from 1989 to 1993. Its main sponsor was Belgian sauce company La William. The team was managed by Paul De Baeremaecker for the first two seasons, followed by Rudy Pevenage.
