= Nationale Sluitingsprijs =

Belgian one-day road cycling race

Race details
- Date: Mid-October
- Region: Flanders, Belgium
- Local name(s): Nationale Sluitingprijs (in Dutch)
- Discipline: Road
- Competition: UCI Europe Tour (2005–2017); National calendar (2018–)
- Type: Single-day
- Web site: www.sluitingsprijs.com

History
- First edition: 1929
- Editions: 90 (as of 2025)
- First winner: Alexander Maes (1901) (BEL)
- Most wins: Frans Van Looy (BEL); Adri van der Poel (NED) (3 wins)
- Most recent: Dries De Bondt (BEL)

Nationale Sluitingprijs is a semi classic European bicycle race held annually in Putte (Kapellen), Belgium. From 2005 to 2017, the race was organized as a 1.1 event on the UCI Europe Tour, before joining the Belgian national calendar. Established in 1929, it is one of the last European races of the season.

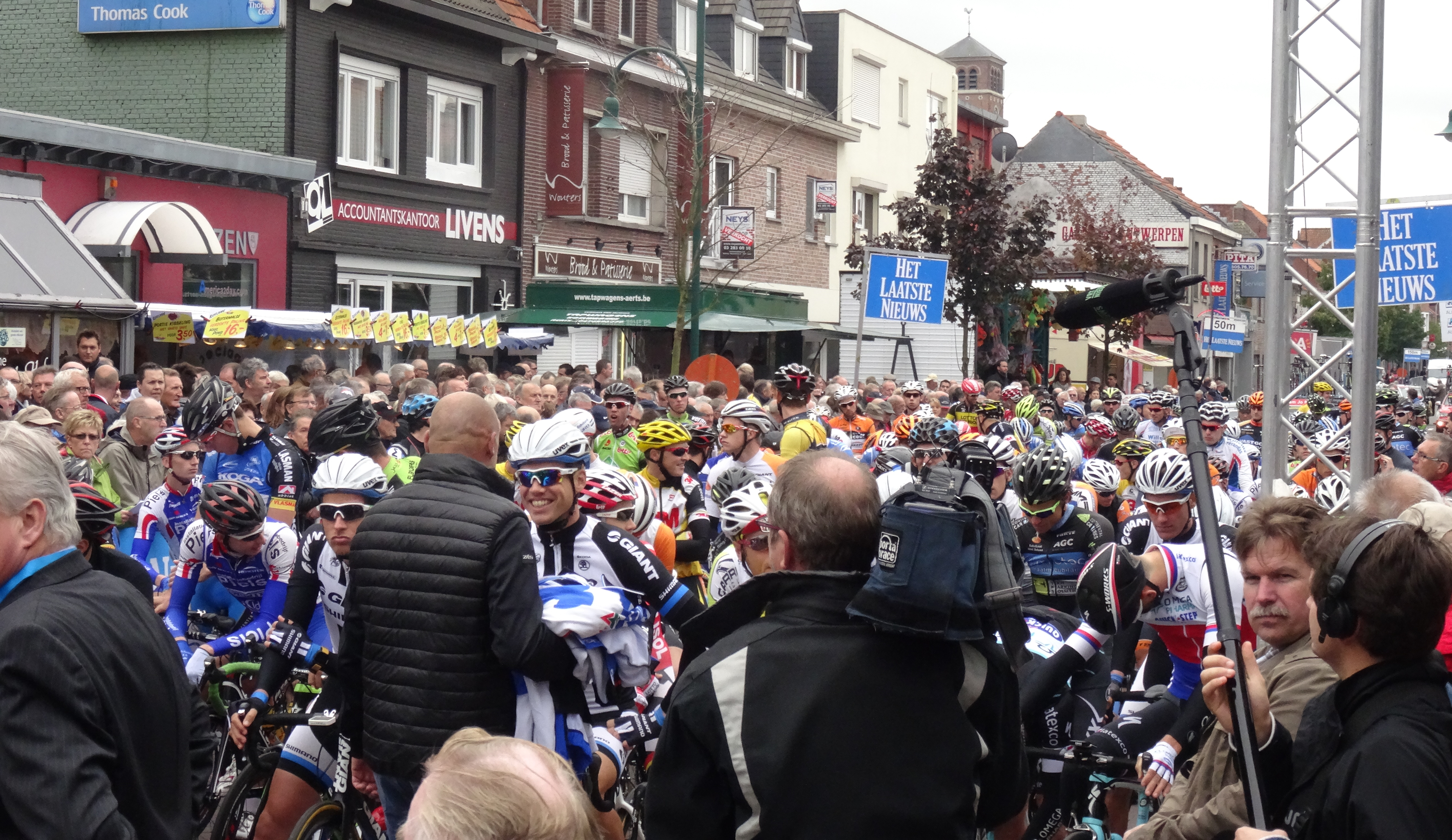
Departure in Putte, 14 October 2014

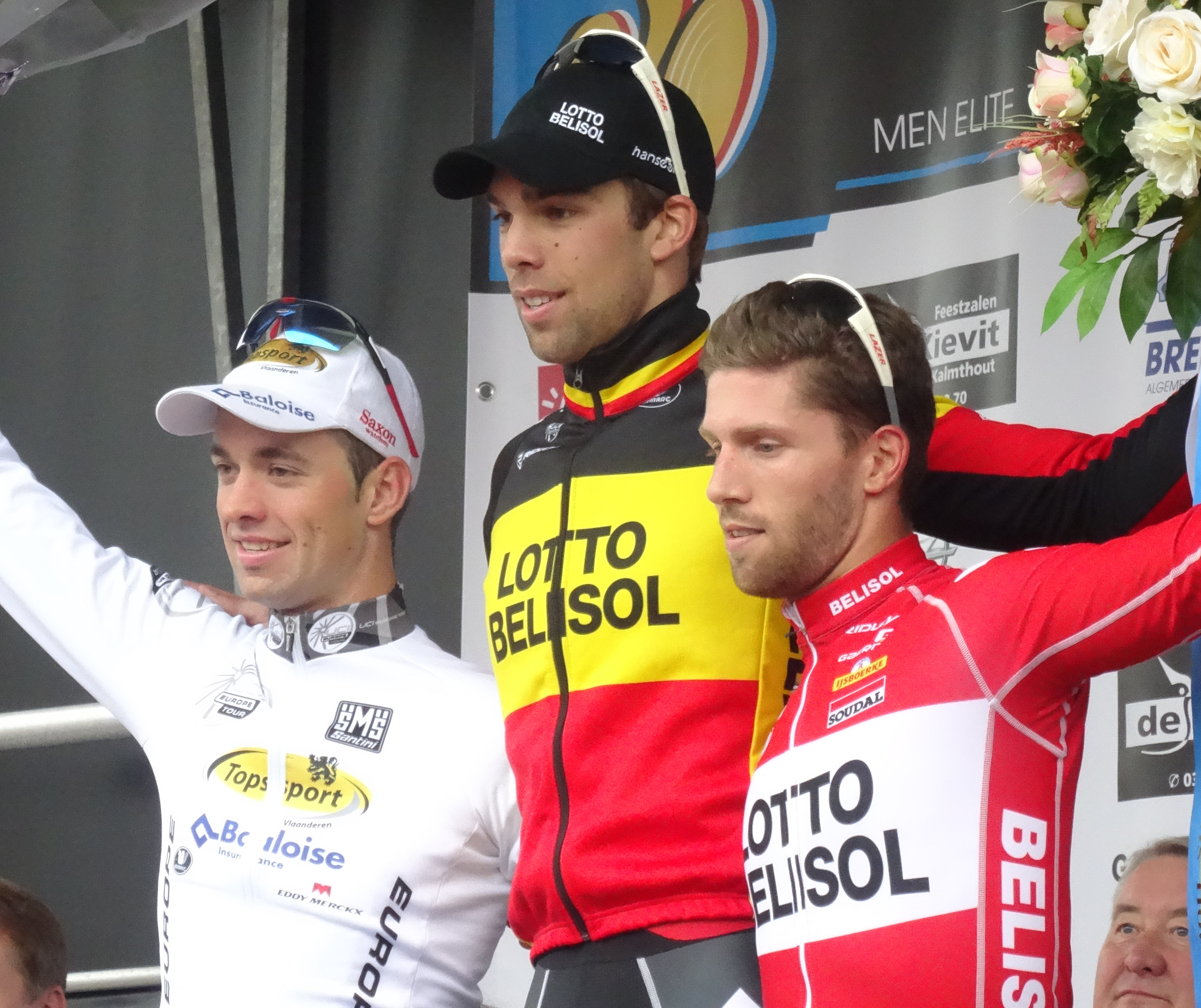
Tom Van Asbroeck, winner Jens Debusschere and Jonas Van Genechten on the 2014 podium

== Winners ==
Year	Country	Rider	Team
1929	Belgium	Alexander Maes (1901)	individual
1930	Belgium	Georges Ronsse	La Française–Diamant
1931	Belgium	Godfried De Vocht	Génial Lucifer–Hutchinson
1932	Belgium	Leo De Rijck	individual
1933	Belgium	Leo De Rijck	individual
1934	Belgium	Jozef Horemans	Dilecta–Wolber
1935	Belgium	Gustave Reyns	Bury
1936	Belgium	Frans Dictus	individual
1937	Belgium	Karel Kaers	Bury
1938	Netherlands	Albert Gijsen	individual
1939- 1942	No race		
1943	Belgium	Frans Hotag	individual
1944	No race		
1945	Netherlands	Theo Middelkamp	Magneet
1946	Belgium	Victor Jacobs	individual
1947	Belgium	Albrecht Ramon	individual
1948	Belgium	Léon Daenekynt	Arliguie–Hutchinson
1949	Belgium	André Declerck	Bertin–Wolber
1950	Belgium	Arthur Mommerency	Starnord–Wolber
1951	Belgium	René Janssens	L'Express
1952	Belgium	René Janssens	L'Express
1953	Belgium	Jozef Schils	Garin–Wolber
1954	Belgium	Jean Bogaerts	Peugeot–Dunlop
1955	Belgium	Karel De Baere	Mercier–BP–Hutchinson
1956	Belgium	Roger Verplaetse	Faema–Guerra
1957	Belgium	Roger Decock	Faema–Guerra
1958	Belgium	Karel De Baere	Libertas–Dr. Mann
1959	Belgium	Joseph Planckaert	Carpano
1960	Belgium	Emile Daems	Philco
1961	Netherlands	Piet Rentmeester	Locomotief-Vredestein
1962	Belgium	Ludo Janssens	Solo–Van Steenbergen
1963	Belgium	Gustaaf De Smet	Wiel's–Groene Leeuw
1964	Belgium	Gustaaf De Smet	Wiel's–Groene Leeuw
1965	Belgium	Frans Brands	Flandria–Romeo
1966	Netherlands	Henk Nijdam	Televizier–Batavus
1967	Belgium	Eddy Merckx	Peugeot–BP–Michelin
1968	Belgium	Frans Brands	Smith's
1969	Netherlands	René Pijnen	Willem II–Gazelle
1970	Belgium	Daniel Vanryckeghem	Mann–Grundig
1971	Belgium	Roger Swerts	Molteni
1972	Belgium	Gustaaf Van Roosbroeck	Watney–Avia
1973	Belgium	Gustaaf Van Roosbroeck	Rokado–De Gribaldy
1974	Belgium	Frans Van Looy	Carpenter–Confortluxe–Flandria
1975	Netherlands	Johan van Katwijk	Alsaver-De Gribaldy
1976	Belgium	Herman Van Springel	Flandria–Velda–West Vlaams Vleesbedrijf
1977	Belgium	Frans Van Looy	Maes–Mini Flat
1978	Belgium	Jos Jacobs	IJsboerke–Gios
1979	Belgium	Frans Van Looy	Kas–Campagnolo
1980	Belgium	Patrick Lerno	Safir–Ludo
1981	Belgium	Jan Bogaert	Vermeer Thijs
1982	Belgium	Luc Colijn	DAF Trucks
1983	Netherlands	Adrie van der Poel	Jacky Aernoudt Meubelen–Rossin–Campagnolo
1984	Belgium	Dirk Heirweg	Safir–Van de Ven
1985	Belgium	Jean-Marie Wampers	Hitachi–Splendor
1986	Netherlands	Adrie van der Poel	Kwantum–Decosol–Yoko
1987	Netherlands	Adrie van der Poel	PDM–Ultima–Concorde
1988	Belgium	Jerry Cooman	S.E.F.B.-Tönissteiner
1989	Belgium	Benjamin Van Itterbeeck	Lotto–Vlaanderen–Jong–Mbk–Merckx
1990	Belgium	Ludo Giesberts	La William–Saltos
1991	Belgium	Herman Frison	Histor–Sigma
1992	Belgium	Paul Haghedooren	Collstrop–Garden Wood–Histor
1993	Belgium	Wim Omloop	La William–Duvel
1994	Netherlands	Maarten den Bakker	TVM–Bison Kit
1995	Belgium	Tom Steels	Vlaanderen 2002–Eddy Merckx
1996	Belgium	Peter Spaenhoven	Palmans-Boghemans
1997	Netherlands	John Talen	Foreldorado-Golff
1998	Belgium	Wilfried Peeters	Mapei–Bricobi
1999	Belgium	Dave Bruylandts	Palmans–Ideal
2000	Netherlands	Steven De Jongh	Rabobank
2001	Belgium	Wesley Van Speybroeck	Lotto–Adecco
2002	Belgium	Geert Omloop	Palmans–Collstrop
2003	Belgium	Nick Nuyens	Quick-Step–Davitamon
2004	Netherlands	Max Van Heeswijk	U.S. Postal Service
2005	Belgium	Gert Steegmans	Davitamon–Lotto
2006	Belgium	Gorik Gardeyn	Unibet.com
2007	Netherlands	Floris Goesinnen	Skil–Shimano
2008	Netherlands	Hans Dekkers	Mitsubishi–Jartazi
2009	France	Denis Flahaut	Landbouwkrediet–Colnago
2010	Great Britain	Adam Blythe	Omega Pharma–Lotto
2011	Belarus	Yauheni Hutarovich	FDJ
2012	Netherlands	Wim Stroetinga	Koga Cycling Team
2013	Belgium	Jens Debusschere	Lotto–Belisol
2014	Belgium	Jens Debusschere	Lotto–Belisol
2015	France	Nacer Bouhanni	Cofidis
2016	Belgium	Roy Jans	Wanty–Groupe Gobert
2017	Netherlands	Arvid de Kleijn	Baby-Dump Cyclingteam
2018	Netherlands	Taco van der Hoorn	Roompot–Nederlandse Loterij
2019	Netherlands	Piotr Havik	BEAT Cycling Club
2020 to 2021	No race due to COVID-19 pandemic in Belgium		
2022	Belgium	Arne Marit	Sport Vlaanderen–Baloise
2023	Netherlands	Coen Vermeltfoort	VolkerWessels Cycling Team
2024	Netherlands	Timo de Jong	VolkerWessels Cycling Team
2025	Belgium	Dries De Bondt	Decathlon–AG2R La Mondiale
