= Wim Omloop =

Belgian cyclist

Personal information
- Born: 5 October 1971 (age 55) Herentals, Belgium

Cycling career
- Sport: Cycling

Wim Omloop (born 5 October 1971) is a Belgian former cyclist. He competed in the individual road race at the 1992 Summer Olympics.
