= Omloop van het Houtland =

Belgian one-day road cycling race

Race details
- Date: Late September
- Region: West Flanders, Belgium
- Local name: Omloop van het Houtland (in Dutch)
- Discipline: Road
- Competition: UCI Europe Tour
- Type: Single-day
- Web site: www.omloopvanhethoutland.be

History
- First edition: 1945
- Editions: 80 (as of 2026)
- First winner: André Maelbrancke (BEL)
- Most wins: 3 riders with 3 wins
- Most recent: Tim Merlier (BEL)

Omloop van het Houtland ("Circuit of Houtland") is a single-day road bicycle race held annually in Lichtervelde in the region of West Flanders, Belgium. Since 2007, the race is organized as a 1.1 event on the UCI Europe Tour.

In 2002 it was held as the first stage of Circuit Franco-Belge.

== Winners ==
Year	Country	Rider	Team
1945	Belgium	André Maelbrancke	Mercier–Hutchinson
1946	Belgium	Roger De Corte	Métropole–Hutchinson
1947	Belgium	Adolf Verschueren	Mercier–Hutchinson
1948	Belgium	Albert Anutschin	Arliguie–Hutchinson
1949	Belgium	André Pieters	Arliguie–Hutchinson
1950	Belgium	André Maelbrancke	Starnord–Wolber
1951	Belgium	André Maelbrancke	Garin–Wolber
1952	Belgium	Valère Ollivier	Bertin–D'Alessandro
1953	Belgium	Arthur Mommerency	Devos Sport
1954	Belgium	Lucien Victor	individual
1955	Belgium	Roger De Corte	Groene Leeuw
1956	Belgium	Léon Van Daele	Bertin–Huret
1957	Belgium	Gilbert Desmet	Faema–Guerra
1958	Belgium	Gilbert Desmet	Faema–Guerra
1959	Belgium	Arthur De Cabooter	Groene Leeuw–Sinalco-SAS
1960	Netherlands	Mies Stolker	Helyett–Leroux
1961	Belgium	Roland Aper	Bertin–L'Avenir
1962	Belgium	Norbert Kerckhove	Dr. Mann–Labo
1963	Belgium	Robert Vandecaveye	Faema–Flandria
1964	Belgium	Arthur De Cabooter	Solo–Superia
1965	Belgium	Gilbert Desmet	Wiel's–Groene Leeuw
1966	Belgium	Walter Boucquet	
1967	Belgium	Jan Boonen	
1968	Belgium	Walter Boucquet	
1969	Belgium	Noël Van Clooster	
1970	Belgium	Roger De Vlaeminck	
1971	Belgium	André Dierickx	
1972	Belgium	Patrick Sercu	
1973	Belgium	Marc Lievens	
1974	Belgium	Willy Planckaert	
1975	Belgium	Eddy Cael	
1976	Belgium	Lieven Malfait	
1977	Belgium	Marc Demeyer	
1978	Belgium	Herman Van Springel	
1979	Belgium	Alain De Roo	
1980	Belgium	Walter Planckaert	
1981	Belgium	Rudy Pevenage	
1982	Belgium	Eddy Vanhaerens	
1983	Belgium	Ronny Vanmarcke	
1984	Belgium	Ludo Frijns	
1985	Belgium	Yvan Lamote	
1986	Belgium	Willem Wijnant	
1987	Belgium	Hendrik Redant	
1988	Belgium	Danny Janssens	
1989	Belgium	Jan Bogaert	
1990	Belgium	Johan Museeuw	
1991	Belgium	Didier Priem	
1992	Belgium	Johan Devos	
1993	Belgium	Danny Daelman	
1994	Belgium	Etienne De Wilde	
1995	Netherlands	Jans Koerts	
1996	Belgium	Johan Capiot	
1997	Belgium	Robbie Vandaele	
1998	Belgium	Etienne De Wilde	
1999	Belgium	Etienne De Wilde	
2000	Belgium	Nico Eeckhout	Palmans–Ideal
2001	Belgium	Geert Omloop	Collstrop–Palmans
2002	Belgium	Kevin Hulsmans	Mapei
2003	Belgium	Geert Omloop	Palmans–Collstrop
2004	Belgium	Bert Dewaele	Landbouwkrediet–Colnago
2005	Belgium	Kevin Van Impe	Chocolade Jacques
2006	Germany	Artur Gajek	Team Wiesenhof
2007	Netherlands	Steven de Jongh	Quick-Step–Innergetic
2008	Denmark	Martin Pedersen	Team GLS
2009	Australia	Graeme Brown	Rabobank
2010	Netherlands	Stefan van Dijk	Verandas Willems
2011	Belgium	Guillaume Van Keirsbulck	Quick-Step
2012	Germany	Marcel Kittel	Argos–Shimano
2013	Germany	Marcel Kittel	Argos–Shimano
2014	Belgium	Jelle Wallays	Topsport Vlaanderen–Baloise
2015	Belgium	Jens Debusschere	Lotto–Soudal
2016	No race		
2017	Belgium	Tom Devriendt	Wanty–Groupe Gobert
2018	Belgium	Jonas van Genechten	Vital Concept
2019	Germany	Max Walscheid	Team Sunweb
2020	No race due to the COVID-19 pandemic		
2021	Netherlands	Taco van der Hoorn	Intermarché–Wanty–Gobert Matériaux
2022	Belgium	Jasper Philipsen	Alpecin–Deceuninck
2023	Belgium	Gerben Thijssen	Intermarché–Circus–Wanty
2024	Germany	Max Walscheid	Team Jayco–AlUla
2025	Belgium	Tim Merlier	Soudal–Quick-Step
2026	Belgium	Tim Merlier	Soudal–Quick-Step
