= Willem Peeters =

Belgian cyclist

Personal information
- Born: 20 May 1953 (age 73) Leuven, Belgium

Cycling career
- Sport: Cycling
- Role: Rider

Willem Peeters (born 20 May 1953) is a Belgian former professional racing cyclist. He won the Omloop Het Nieuwsblad in 1976.
