= Dirk Heirweg =

Belgian cyclist

Personal information
- Full name: Dirk Heirweg
- Born: 27 September 1955 (age 71) Zele, Belgium

Cycling career
- Sport: Cycling
- Discipline: Road
- Role: Rider

Professional teams
- 1978: Flandria-Velda-Lano
- 1979–1980: DAF Trucks
- 1981: Boston Mavic
- 1982–1985: Safir-Van de Ven
- 1986–1987: TeVe Blad-Eddy Merckx
- 1988–1989: Isoglass
- 1990–1991: S.E.F.B.–Saxon–Gan
- 1992: Assur Carpets-Willy Naessens-Euroclean

Major wins
- Omloop van de Vlaamse Scheldeboorden (1979); Driedaagse van West-Vlaanderen (1982); Nationale Sluitingsprijs (1984); Kampioenschap van Vlaanderen (1987)

Dirk Heirweg (born 27 September 1955) is a Belgian former racing cyclist. He competed in the individual road race and team time trial events at the 1976 Summer Olympics.
