= Tour de Liège =

Cycling race

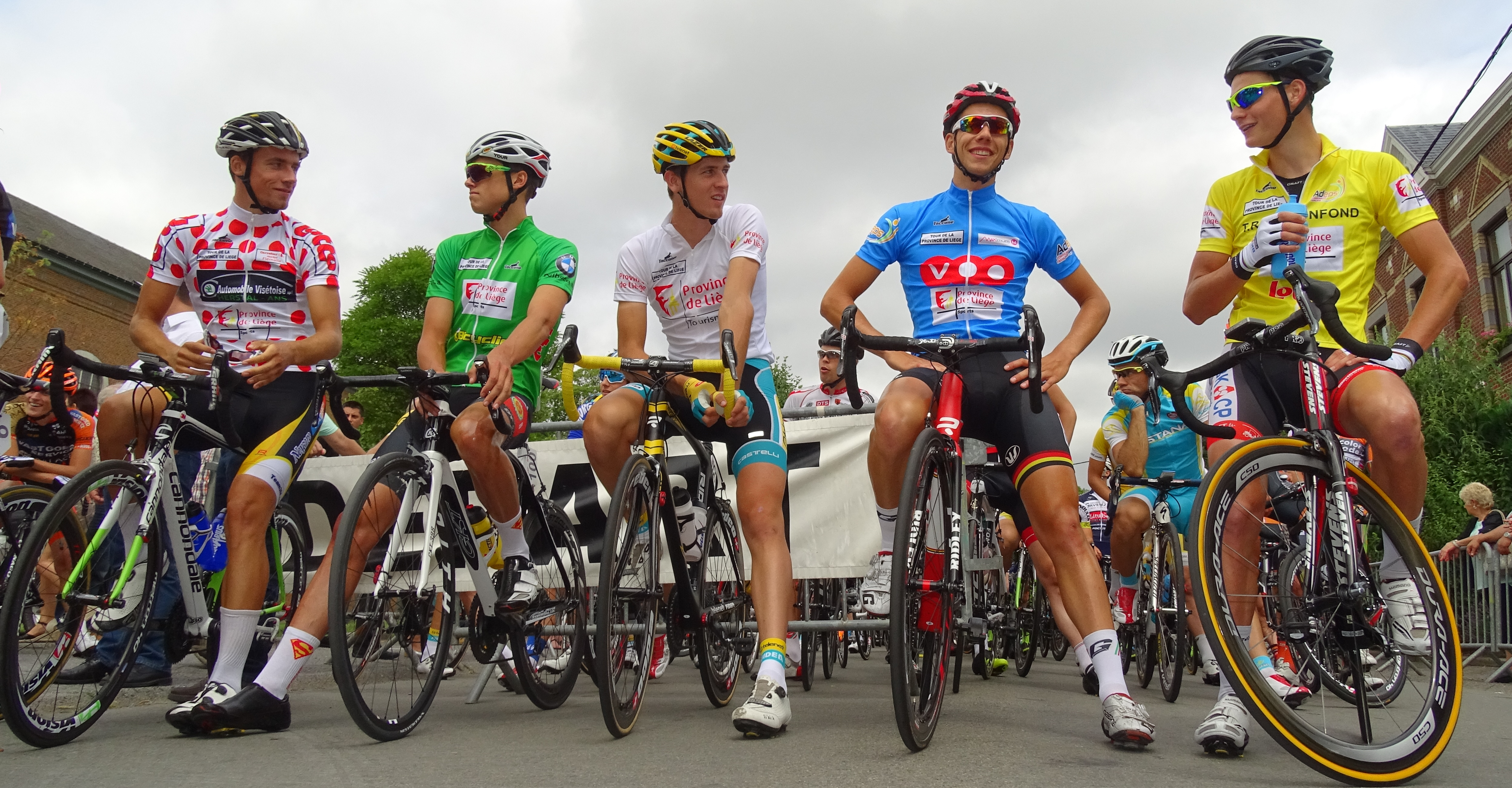
- Stage 3 in the 2015 edition, with Marchin as both start and finish place

Race details
- Date: July
- Region: Liège
- English name: Tour of the Province of Liège
- Local name: Ronde van Luik (Dutch)
- Discipline: Road
- Competition: National event (NE)
- Type: Stage race
- Web site: www.ucseraing.eu/TPL/index_002.htm

History
- First edition: 1962
- Editions: 62 (as of 2025)
- First winner: Julien Stevens (BEL)
- Most wins: Dirk Meier (GER); Danny In 't Ven (BEL); (2 wins)
- Most recent: Iben Rommelaere (BEL)

The Tour de la province de Liège (English: Tour of the Province of Liège) is a cycling race held annually in the Liège province of Belgium. Although it isn't part of UCI Europe Tour, it has been won by many famous cyclists since its creation in 1962, including Bjarne Riis, Aart Vierhouten, Koos Moerenhout, Stijn Devolder and Johan Vansummeren.

== Winners ==
Year	Winner	Second	Third
1962	(Belgium) Julien Stevens	(Belgium) Jos Huysmans	(Belgium) Georges Van Den Berghe
1963	(Belgium) Roger Swerts	(Belgium) Roger Coopmans	(Belgium) Herman Van Springel
1964	(Belgium) Leopold Heuvelmans	(Belgium) Jean Christiaens	(Belgium) Alfons Heylen
1965	(Belgium) Marcel Van Rooy	(Belgium) Joseph Henikenne	(Belgium) Guy Willem
1966	(West Germany) Horst Ruster	(Belgium) André Froidmont	(Belgium) Marc Sohet
1967	(Netherlands) Henk Hiddinga	(Belgium) Johnny Pieters	(Belgium) Henri Frenay
1968	(Belgium) Willy Van Uytsel	(Belgium) Jozef Pauwels	(Belgium) Raymond Vanstraelen
1969	(France) Jean-Claude Alary	(France) Hervé Vermeeren	(Belgium) Marcel Grifnee
1970	(Belgium) Marcel Sannen	(Belgium) Andre Doyen	(Belgium) Theo Dockx
1971	(Belgium) Jan Van De Wiele	(Belgium) Raymond Vanstraelen	(Belgium) Ludovic Noels
1972	(Czechoslovakia) Miloš Hrazdíra	(Czechoslovakia) Bedrick Smetana	(Czechoslovakia) Jiří Mainuš
1973	(Belgium) Alain Kaye	(Belgium) Eddy Van Hoof	(Belgium) Jos Gysemans
1974	(Netherlands) Henk Smits	(Belgium) André Coppers	(Belgium) Alain Kaye
1975	(Belgium) Ferdi Van Den Haute	(Belgium) Pol Verschuere	(Netherlands) Jo Maas
1976	(Belgium) René Martens	(Belgium) Eddy Copmans	(Netherlands) Martin Havik
1977	(Belgium) Christian Dumont	(Netherlands) Jo Maas	(Netherlands) Johan van der Velde
1978	(Belgium) Daniel Willems	(New Zealand) Paul Jesson	(Netherlands) Maarten de Vos
1979	(Belgium) Guy Nulens	(Belgium) Ronny Van Holen	(France) Philippe Bodier
1980	(United Kingdom) Derek Hunt	(Belgium) Luc De Smet	(Netherlands) Berry Zoontjens
1981	(Netherlands) Herman Winkel	(Belgium) Johan Lambrechts	(Netherlands) Maarten de Vos
1982	(Belgium) Tony De Ridder	(Netherlands) John de Crom	(Netherlands) Peter Harings
1983	(Netherlands) Rinus Ansems	(Netherlands) Victor Buisman	(Netherlands) Anjo van Loon
1984	(Netherlands) Jan Siemons	(East Germany) Uwe Raab	(Belgium) Bruno Vanweverenbergh
1985	(Denmark) Bjarne Riis	(Netherlands) Erik Breukink	(West Germany) Michael Pape
1986	(Netherlands) Ton Zwirs	(Netherlands) Rob Kleinsman	(Belgium) Peter De Clercq
1987	(East Germany) Dirk Meier	(East Germany) Roland Hennig	(East Germany) Thomas Liese
1988	(Netherlands) Pierre Duin	(Belgium) Jean-Luc Trevisiani	(Belgium) Bart Leysen
1989	(East Germany) Dirk Meier	(Netherlands) Raymond Meijs	(Belgium) Patrick Lonay
1990	(East Germany) Thomas Liese	(France) Olivier Ackermann	(Netherlands) Raymond Meijs
1991	(Netherlands) Raymond Meijs	(Belgium) Fabrice Dejardin	(Netherlands) Gino Jansen
1992	(Sweden) Allen Andersson	(Sweden) Michel Lafis	(Belgium) Denis Minet
1993	(Netherlands) Aart Vierhouten	(Belgium) Marc Streel	(Belgium) Marc Janssens
1994	(Netherlands) Koos Moerenhout	(Netherlands) Hans van Dijk	(Belgium) Mario Aerts
1995	(Denmark) Stig Guldbæk	(Belgium) Steven Van Aken	(Belgium) Peter Van Santvliet
1996	(Belgium) Danny In 't Ven	(Italy) Daniele De Paoli	(Belgium) Renaud Boxus
1997	(Netherlands) Matthé Pronk	(Netherlands) Marcel Duijn	(Netherlands) Nico Vuurens
1998	(Belgium) Jurgen Van Roosbroeck	(Belgium) Davy Daniels	(Netherlands) John van den Akker
1999	(Belgium) Danny In 't Ven	(Belgium) Renaud Boxus	(United Kingdom) Oliver Penney
2000	(Switzerland) Oliver Penney	(Belgium) Thierry De Groote	(Belgium) Andy Cappelle
2001	(Belgium) Stijn Devolder	(New Zealand) Glen Chadwick	(Belgium) Johan Coenen
2002	(Belgium) Kevin De Weert	(Netherlands) Pieter Weening	(Belgium) Philippe Gilbert
2003	(Belgium) Johan Vansummeren	(Belgium) Frederik Veuchelen	(Netherlands) Thomas Dekker
2004	(Lithuania) Darius Strole	(Belgium) Grégory Habeaux	(Colombia) Leonardo Duque
2005	(Netherlands) Jeroen Boelen	(Netherlands) Jelle van Groezen	(Netherlands) Robert Gesink
2006	(Belgium) Kevin Seeldraeyers	(Belgium) Geert Steurs	(Belgium) Francis De Greef
2007	(Bulgaria) Ivaïlo Gabrovski	(Lithuania) Ramūnas Navardauskas	(Belgium) Thomas De Gendt
2008	(Belgium) Jan Bakelants	(Belgium) Jelle Hanseeuw	(Denmark) Thomas Vedel Kvist
2009	(Belgium) Thomas Degand	(Belgium) Bart De Clercq	(Netherlands) Brian Bulgaç
2010	(Belgium) Gilles Devillers	(Belgium) Sander Cordeel	(Belgium) Arthur Vanoverberghe
2011	(Netherlands) Brian Bulgaç	(France) Clément Lhotellerie	(Belgium) Tosh Van der Sande
2012	(Belgium) Thomas Sprengers	(Belgium) Walt De Winter	(France) Clément Lhotellerie
2013	(New Zealand) Tom David	(Belgium) Frederik Backaert	(Belgium) Jérôme Baugnies
2014	(Belgium) Wout van Aert	(Belgium) Jimmy Janssens	(Belgium) Gianni Vermeersch
2015	(Belgium) Kenneth Van Rooy	(Netherlands) Rob Ruijgh	(Belgium) Dimitri Peyskens
2016	(Belgium) Kevin De Jonghe	(Belgium) Gianni Marchand	(Belgium) Jimmy Janssens
2017	(Belgium) Jimmy Janssens	(Belgium) Laurens Sweeck	(Czech Republic) Adam Ťoupalík
2018	(Belgium) Michiel Dieleman	(Belgium) Nicolas Cleppe	(Belgium) Cédric Raymackers
2019	(Belgium) Nicolas Cleppe	(Belgium) Lennert Teugels	(United Kingdom) Charlie Meredith
2020–2021	No race		
2022	(Germany) Jason Osborne	(Belgium) Mauro Verwilt	(Belgium) Robbe Van Praet
2023	(Italy) Luca Vergallito	(Belgium) Jelle Vermoote	(Belgium) Lander Loockx
2024	(Belgium) Luca Jaques	(Belgium) Jérôme Baugnies	(Belgium) Thomas De Neve
2025	(Belgium) Iben Rommelaere	(Belgium) Arthur Tirry	(Belgium) Nathan Amerlynck

=== Wins by country ===
Number	Country
32	Belgium
13	Netherlands
3	East Germany
2	Denmark
1	Bulgaria; Italy; Czechoslovakia; France; Lithuania; New Zealand; Sweden; Switzerland; West Germany
