= 1998 Hel van het Mergelland =

Race details
- Dates: 4 April 1998
- Stages: 1
- Distance: 180 km (111.8 mi)
- Winning time: 4h 45' 02"

Results
| | Winner | Raymond Meijs (NED) |
| | Second | Ralf Grabsch (GER) |
| | Third | Hans De Meester (BEL) |

The 1998 Hel van het Mergelland was the 26th edition of the Volta Limburg Classic cycle race and was held on 4 April 1998. The race started and finished in Eijsden. The race was won by Raymond Meijs.

== General classification ==
Final general classification

| Rank | Rider | Time |
|---|---|---|
| 1 | Raymond Meijs (NED) | 4h 45' 02" |
| 2 | Ralf Grabsch (GER) | + 0" |
| 3 | Hans De Meester (BEL) | + 3' 30" |
| 4 | John van den Akker (NED) | + 3' 30" |
| 5 | Leif Hoste (BEL) | + 3' 30" |
| 6 | Matthé Pronk (NED) | + 4' 28" |
| 7 | Marcel Luppes (NED) | + 4' 32" |
| 8 | Bram de Groot (NED) | + 4' 35" |
| 9 | Marcin Gebka (POL) | + 14' 08" |
| 10 | Marc Patry (BEL) | + 14' 08" |
