= 2002 Hel van het Mergelland =

Race details
- Dates: 6 April 2002
- Stages: 1
- Distance: 190.6 km (118.4 mi)
- Winning time: 4h 59' 35"

Results
	Winner	Corey Sweet (AUS)
	Second	Thierry De Groote (BEL)
	Third	Germ Van de Burg (NED)

The 2002 Hel van het Mergelland was the 29th edition of the Volta Limburg Classic cycle race and was held on 6 April 2002. The race started and finished in Eijsden. The race was won by Corey Sweet.

== General classification ==
Final general classification

Rank	Rider	Time
1	Corey Sweet (AUS)	4h 59' 35"
2	Thierry De Groote (BEL)	+ 0"
3	Germ Van de Burg (NED)	+ 0"
4	Christian Poos (LUX)	+ 4"
5	Remco Van der Ven (NED)	+ 1' 08"
6	Tom Desmet (BEL)	+ 1' 14"
7	Bram Schmitz (NED)	+ 1' 50"
8	Peter Wuyts (BEL)	+ 1' 50"
9	Jos Lucassen (NED)	+ 1' 50"
10	Michael Skelde (DEN)	+ 1' 50"
