= Flèche Hesbignonne =

Road cycling race

Flèche Hesbignonne-Cras Avernas
Race details
- Date: June
- Region: Belgium
- Discipline: Road
- Competition: UCI Europe Tour
- Type: One-day race

History
- First edition: 1952
- Editions: 53
- Final edition: 2006
- First winner: Constant Verschueren (BEL)
- Most wins: Alfons De Bal (BEL) (3 wins)
- Final winner: Erwin Thijs (BEL)

The Flèche Hesbignonne-Cras Avernas was a one-day road cycling race held annually in Belgium. Created in 1952, it first took place between Niel and Sint-Truiden. It was then held between Cras-Avernas and Remouchamps. It was on the UCI Europe Tour in category 1.2 for its final editions in 2005 and 2006.

== Winners ==
Year	Winner	Second	Third
1952	(Belgium) Constant Verschueren	(Belgium) Jan Zagers	(Belgium) Edgard Sorgeloos
1953	(Belgium) Alois De Hertog	(Luxembourg) Bim Diederich	(Belgium) Edward Peeters
1954	(Belgium) Jan Zagers	(Belgium) Lucien Huybrechts	(Belgium) Edward Peeters
1955	(Belgium) Rik Luyten	(Belgium) Ernest Sterckx	(Belgium) Willy Vannitsen
1956	(Belgium) Lode Anthonis	(Belgium) Guillaume Hendrickx	(Belgium) Pierre Machiels
1957	(Belgium) Frans Schoubben	(Belgium) Jan Zagers	(Belgium) Jozef Planckaert
1958	(Belgium) Francis Kemplaire	(Belgium) Leopold Schaeken	(Belgium) Jos Verachtert
1959	(Belgium) Jos Verachtert	(Belgium) Louis Proost	(Belgium) Frans Aerenhouts
1960	(Belgium) Jozef Schils	(Belgium) Laurent Christiaens	(Belgium) Guillaume Michiels
1961	(Belgium) Jan Adriaensens	(Belgium) Eddy Pauwels	(Netherlands) Jef Lahaye
1962	(Belgium) Jozef Schils	(Netherlands) Piet Damen	(Belgium) Laurent Christiaens
1963	(Belgium) Rik Luyten	(Belgium) Ferdinand Bracke	(Belgium) Theo Nijs
1964	No race		
1965	(Netherlands) Leo Knops	(Belgium) Romain Robben	(Netherlands) Reindert de Jong
1966	(Belgium) Herman Van Springel	(Belgium) Joseph Spruyt	(Belgium) Roger Swerts
1967	(Belgium) Herman Van Springel	(Belgium) Noel Depauw	(Belgium) Herman Vrancken
1968	(United Kingdom) Michael Wright	(Belgium) Roger Blockx	(Belgium) Jozef Huysmans
1969	(Belgium) Alfons De Bal	(Belgium) Jan Boonen	(Belgium) Christian Callens
1970	(Belgium) Frans Verbeeck	(Belgium) Joseph Bruyère	(Belgium) Peter Nassen
1971	(Belgium) Ferdinand Bracke	(Belgium) Julien Stevens	(Luxembourg) Eddy Schutz
1972	(Belgium) Georges Van Coningsloo	(Belgium) Joseph Van Olmen	(Belgium) Georges Barras
1973	(Belgium) Julien Van Lint	(Belgium) Georges Van Coningsloo	(Belgium) Antoon Houbrechts
1974	(Belgium) Gustaaf Van Roosbroeck	(Belgium) Roger Loysch	(Belgium) Romain Maes
1975	(Belgium) Jacques Martin	(Belgium) Léon Thomas	(Belgium) Georges Pintens
1976	(Belgium) Ludo Peeters	(Belgium) Willem Peeters	(Belgium) Marcel Laurens
1977	(Belgium) Alfons De Bal	(Belgium) Herman Van Springel	(Belgium) Victor Van Schil
1978	(Belgium) Frans Van Vlierberghe	(Belgium) Jacques Martin	(Belgium) Eddy Vanhaerens
1979	(Belgium) Alfons De Bal	(Belgium) Christian Dumont	(Belgium) Gery Verlinden
1980	(Belgium) Jean Vanderstappen	(United Kingdom) Dudley Hayton	(Belgium) André Verbraecken
1981	(West Germany) Gregor Braun	(Belgium) Eddy Planckaert	(Belgium) Louis Luyton
1982	(Belgium) René Martens	(Belgium) Pierrot Cuypers	(Belgium) Luc Colijn
1983	(Belgium) Patrick Versluys	(Belgium) Michel Dernies	(Netherlands) Gérard Veldscholten
1984	(Belgium) Jos Jacobs	(Belgium) William Tackaert	(Belgium) Alfons De Wolf
1985	(Belgium) Gery Verlinden	(Belgium) Patrick Toelen	(Belgium) Dirk Demol
1986	(Belgium) Johan Delathouwer	(Belgium) Dirk De Wolf	(Belgium) Martin Durant
1987	(Belgium) René Martens	(Belgium) Erik Vanderaerden	(Belgium) Marc Seynaeve
1988	(Belgium) Stephan Van Leeuwe	(Belgium) Koen Vekemans	(Belgium) Carlo Bomans
1989	(Belgium) Jan Bogaert	(Belgium) Etienne De Wilde	(Belgium) Bruno Geuens
1990	(Denmark) Søren Lilholt	(Belgium) Yves Godimus	(Belgium) Hendrik Redant
1991	(Belgium) Wilfried Nelissen	(Netherlands) Michel Cornelisse	(Soviet Union) Konstantin Khrabtsov
1992	(Belgium) Patrick Schoovaerts	(Belgium) Johan Verstrepen	(Belgium) Jan Mattheus
1993	(Belgium) Nico Emonds	(Belgium) Frank Corvers	(Belgium) Jan Van Camp
1994	(Belgium) Nico Emonds	(Belgium) Johan Remels	(Netherlands) Jeroen Blijlevens
1995	(Belgium) Wilfried Peeters	(Netherlands) Jelle Nijdam	(Belgium) Frank Vandenbroucke
1996	(Belgium) Marc Streel	(Belgium) Johan Museeuw	(Belgium) Stéphane Hennebert
1997	(Belgium) Peter Verbeken	(Belgium) Robbie Van Daele	(Belgium) Erwin Thijs
1998	(Belgium) Peter Verbeken	(Belgium) Bert Roesems	(Netherlands) Michel Cornelisse
1999	(Belgium) Wim Omloop	(Belgium) Bart Heirewegh	(Lithuania) Donatas Virbickas
2000	(Belgium) Michel Vanhaecke	(Belgium) Marc Streel	(Belgium) Bert Roesems
2001	(Netherlands) John Talen	(Ukraine) Oleg Pankov	(Belgium) Jan Claes
2002	No race		
2003	(Belgium) Erwin Thijs	(Belgium) Geert Omloop	(Belgium) Joseph Boulton
2004	(Australia) Rory Sutherland	(Belgium) Geert Van Bondt	(Belgium) Ludovic Capelle
2005	(Belgium) Geert Verheyen	(Netherlands) Matthé Pronk	(Belgium) Nico Sijmens
2006	(Belgium) Erwin Thijs	(Belgium) Johan Verstrepen	(Japan) Shinichi Fukushima
