= 1997 Hel van het Mergelland =

Race details
- Dates: 5 April 1997
- Stages: 1
- Distance: 180 km (111.8 mi)
- Winning time: 4h 44' 39"

Results
	Winner	Raymond Meijs (NED)
	Second	John Talen (NED)
	Third	John van den Akker (NED)

The 1997 Hel van het Mergelland was the 25th edition of the Volta Limburg Classic cycle race and was held on 5 April 1997. The race started and finished in Eijsden. The race was won by Raymond Meijs.

== General classification ==
Final general classification

Rank	Rider	Time
1	Raymond Meijs (NED)	4h 44' 39"
2	John Talen (NED)	+ 0"
3	John van den Akker (NED)	+ 2' 01"
4	Rik Reinerink (NED)	+ 3' 12"
5	Rik Van Slycke (BEL)	+ 3' 14"
6	Niels van de Steen (NED)	+ 3' 14"
7	Bram de Groot (NED)	+ 3' 14"
8	Peter Wuyts (BEL)	+ 3' 14"
9	Rico Schmidt (GER)	+ 3' 21"
10	Louis de Koning (NED)	+ 3' 55"
