= 1999 Hel van het Mergelland =

Race details
- Dates: 10 April 1999
- Stages: 1
- Distance: 180 km (111.8 mi)
- Winning time: 4h 30' 13"

Results
	Winner	Raymond Meijs (NED)
	Second	Michel Vanhaecke (BEL)
	Third	Ralf Grabsch (GER)

The 1999 Hel van het Mergelland was the 27th edition of the Volta Limburg Classic cycle race and was held on 10 April 1999. The race started and finished in Eijsden. The race was won by Raymond Meijs.

== General classification ==
Final general classification

Rank	Rider	Time
1	Raymond Meijs (NED)	4h 30' 13"
2	Michel Vanhaecke (BEL)	+ 10"
3	Ralf Grabsch (GER)	+ 12"
4	Davy Delme (BEL)	+ 1' 33"
5	Christian Wegmann (GER)	+ 1' 33"
6	Thorwald Veneberg (NED)	+ 1' 33"
7	Davy Dubbeldam (NED)	+ 1' 33"
8	Edwin Dunning (NED)	+ 1' 39"
9	Bert Roesems (BEL)	+ 1' 48"
10	Ronald Mutsaars (NED)	+ 1' 48"
