= 2003 Hel van het Mergelland =

Race details
- Dates: 5 April 2003
- Stages: 1
- Distance: 191 km (119 mi)
- Winning time: 4h 55' 59"

Results
	Winner	Wim Van Huffel (BEL)
	Second	Nico Sijmens (BEL)
	Third	Jens Heppner (GER)

The 2003 Hel van het Mergelland was the 30th edition of the Volta Limburg Classic cycle race and was held on 5 April 2003. The race started and finished in Eijsden. The race was won by Wim Van Huffel.

== General classification ==
Final general classification

Rank	Rider	Time
1	Wim Van Huffel (BEL)	4h 55' 59"
2	Nico Sijmens (BEL)	+ 4"
3	Jens Heppner (GER)	+ 4"
4	Allan Iacuone (AUS)	+ 4"
5	Igor Abakoumov (BEL)	+ 40"
6	Ralf Grabsch (GER)	+ 55"
7	Enrico Poitschke (GER)	+ 55"
8	Jos Lucassen (NED)	+ 57"
9	Christian Poos (LUX)	+ 59"
10	Jos Harms (NED)	+ 3' 05"
