= 2000 Grote Prijs Jef Scherens =

Race details
- Dates: 3 September 2000
- Stages: 1
- Distance: 192 km (119.3 mi)
- Winning time: 4h 33' 00"

Results
	Winner	Dave Bruylandts (BEL)
	Second	Andy De Smet (BEL)
	Third	Nicki Sørensen (DEN)

The 2000 Grote Prijs Jef Scherens was the 34th edition of the Grote Prijs Jef Scherens cycle race and was held on 3 September 2000. The race started and finished in Leuven. The race was won by Dave Bruylandts.

== General classification ==
Final general classification

Rank	Rider	Time
1	Dave Bruylandts (BEL)	4h 33' 00"
2	Andy De Smet (BEL)	+ 0"
3	Nicki Sørensen (DEN)	+ 0"
4	Erwin Thijs (BEL)	+ 0"
5	Ludovic Capelle (BEL)	+ 0"
6	Saulius Ruškys (LTU)	+ 0"
7	Max van Heeswijk (NED)	+ 0"
8	Aart Vierhouten (NED)	+ 0"
9	Chris Peers (BEL)	+ 0"
10	Arvis Piziks (LAT)	+ 0"
