= Team Cologne =

Team information
- UCI code: TCL
- Registered: Germany
- Founded: 1998
- Disbanded: 2002
- Discipline: Road
- Status: Trade Team II

Key personnel
- General manager: Dieter Koslar
- Team managers: Hans-Werner Kolling; Hans Küpper; Bruno Zollfrank

Team name history
- 1998 1999–2002: Team Gerolsteiner; Team Cologne

Team Cologne was a German road cycling team that competed professionally between 1998 and 2002. The team was originally Gerolsteniner.

== Major wins ==
- Hel van het Mergelland: Raymond Meijs (1998, 1999)
- Ronde van Noord-Holland: Jans Koerts (1999)
- Ronde van Drenthe: Jans Koerts (1999)
- OZ Wielerweekend: Jans Koerts (1999)
- Giro del Capo: Davy Dubbeldam (1999)
- Ster der Beloften: Ralf Grabsch (1999)
- Hel van het Mergelland: Bert Grabsch (2000)
