= Danny In 't Ven =

Belgian cyclist

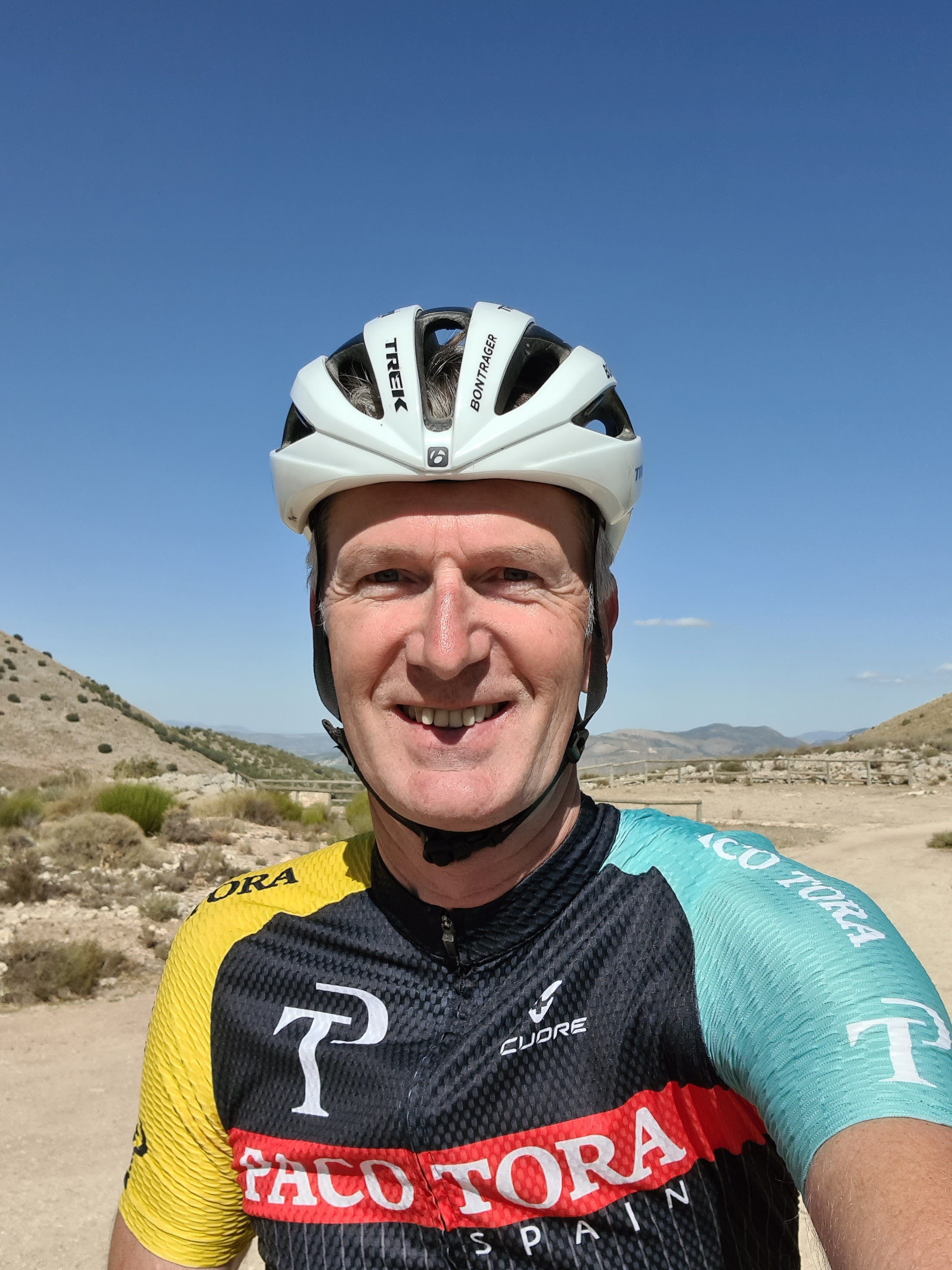
- Danny In 't Ven in 2022

Personal information
- Born: 8 August 1968 (age 58) Turnhout, Belgium

Cycling career
- Sport: Cycling
- Current team: Retired
- Discipline: Road
- Role: Rider

Professional team
- 1992–1993: Collstrop–Garden Wood

Danny In 't Ven (born 8 August 1968) is a Belgian former professional road cyclist. His father Willy and uncle Paul were also professional cyclists. He competed in the 1993 Vuelta a España and finished 95th overall.

== Major results ==
1986
1st Time trial, National Junior Road Championships
1988
1st Stage 2 Tour of Belgium amateurs
1989
1st Stage 2 Tour of Belgium amateurs
1990
1st Time trial, National Amateur Road Championships
1991
1st Time trial, National Amateur Road Championships
1st Stage 2 (ITT) Tour de Liège
2nd Overall Tour of Belgium amateurs

1st Stage 3b (ITT)

1992
1st Overall Tour cycliste de l'Essonne

1st Stage 3b

1st Prologue & Stage 3 Milk Race
1993
10th Omloop van het Houtland
10th Ronde van Limburg
1994
1st Boucle de l'Artois
2nd Overall Tour of Belgium amateurs

1st Stages 2 & 3 (ITT)

2nd Flèche Ardennaise
2nd Kattekoers
1995
1st Overall Tweedaagse van de Gaverstreek

1st Stage 1

1st Omloop Het Volk Amateurs
1st Stage 1 Triptyque Ardennais
1st Stage 4 Circuit Franco-Belge
1st Stage 13 Fresca Classic
1996
1st Overall Tour de Liège

1st Stages 1 & 6 (ITT)

3rd Grand Prix de Beuvry-la-Forêt
9th Overall Tour de la Region Wallonne
1997
1st Internationale Wielertrofee Jong Maar Moedig
1998
1st Stage 4 Tour de Liège
1999
1st Overall Tour de Liège

1st Stage 6 (ITT)

2000
2nd Overall Ronde de l'Oise
2002
1st Grand Prix de Beuvry-la-Forêt
2nd Internationale Wielertrofee Jong Maar Moedig
2003
1st Stages 4, 14 & 17 International Cycling Classic
3rd De Drie Zustersteden
8th Vlaamse Havenpijl
