= 2008 Hel van het Mergelland =

Race details
- Dates: 5 April 2008
- Stages: 1
- Distance: 185.1 km (115.0 mi)
- Winning time: 4h 50' 17"

Results
	Winner	Tony Martin (GER)
	Second	Adam Hansen (AUS)
	Third	Pieter Jacobs (BEL)

The 2008 Hel van het Mergelland was the 35th edition of the Volta Limburg Classic cycling race and was held on 5 April 2008. The race started and finished in Eijsden. The race was won by Tony Martin.

== General classification ==
Final general classification

Rank	Rider	Time
1	Tony Martin (GER)	4h 50' 17"
2	Adam Hansen (AUS)	+ 0"
3	Pieter Jacobs (BEL)	+ 6' 52"
4	Johnny Hoogerland (NED)	+ 6' 52"
5	Lieuwe Westra (NED)	+ 6' 54"
6	Bobbie Traksel (NED)	+ 7' 39"
7	Björn Glasner (GER)	+ 10' 39"
8	František Raboň (CZE)	+ 10' 41"
9	Nico Sijmens (BEL)	+ 10' 59"
10	Bram Schmitz (NED)	+ 10' 59"
