= Grabsch =

Grabsch is a surname. Notable people with the surname include:

- Bert Grabsch (born 1975). German cyclist, brother of Ralf
- Ralf Grabsch (born 1973), German cyclist, brother of Bert
