= Michael Skelde =

Former Danish road cyclist

Personal information
- Born: 13 August 1973 (age 53) Horsens, Denmark

Cycling career
- Sport: Cycling
- Current team: Retired
- Discipline: Road
- Role: Rider; Directeur sportif

Professional teams
- 1997: PSV Köln
- 1999: Team EC Bayer Worringen
- 2000: Cycling Horsens
- 2001–2003: Team Fakta
- 2004: Alessio–Bianchi
- 2005–2007: Glud & Marstrand–Horsens

Managerial teams
- 2007–2015: Glud & Marstrand–Horsens
- 2016: Stölting Service Group
- 2017: Team VéloCONCEPT
- 2019–2021: Riwal Readynez

Michael Skelde (born 13 August 1973) is a Danish former professional road cyclist who later became a team manager.

== Major results ==
1997
7th GP Herning
9th GP Aarhus
1999
1st Stage 2 Tour of Rhodes
4th Rund um Düren
6th Ronde van Drenthe
8th Ronde van Noord-Holland
2000
2nd Poreč Trophy 3
7th Grand Prix Midtbank
9th GP Aarhus
2001
4th Groningen–Münster
9th Rund um die Hainleite-Erfurt
10th Paris–Bourges
2002
5th GP Aarhus
6th Tour de Berne
8th Groningen–Münster
9th Rund um Köln
10th Hel van het Mergelland
2003
2nd Overall Étoile de Bessèges
4th GP du canton d'Argovie
5th Overall Uniqa Classic
5th Grote Prijs Jef Scherens
5th Boucles de l'Aulne
6th Overall Danmark Rundt
9th Luk-Cup Bühl
2005
8th GP Aarhus
2007
3rd East Midlands International CiCLE Classic
