= Van Straelen =

Van Straelen or Vanstraelen is a Belgium surname. Notable people with this name:

- Georges Van Straelen (1956–2012), French footballer and coach
- Raymond Vanstraelen (born 1947), Belgian entrepreneur and cyclist
- Robert Van Straelen (b. 1934), Belgium Emeritus Professor at Antwerp Management School
- Victor van Straelen (1889–1964), Belgian conservationist, palaeontologist and carcinologist
