= 2018 Tour de Wallonie =

2018 UCI Europe Tour
- Event poster with previous winner Dylan Teuns

Race details
- Dates: 28 July-1 August 2018
- Stages: 5
- Winning time: 20h 22' 26"

Results
Jersey awarded to the overall winner	Winner	Tim Wellens (BEL)	(Lotto–Soudal)
	Second	Quinten Hermans (BEL)	(Telenet–Fidea Lions)
	Third	Pieter Serry (BEL)	(Quick-Step Floors)
Jersey awarded to the points classification winner	Points	Quinten Hermans (BEL)	(Telenet–Fidea Lions)
Jersey awarded to the mountains classification winner	Mountains	Nicolas Cleppe (BEL)	(Telenet–Fidea Lions)
Jersey awarded to the youth classification winner	Youth	Quinten Hermans (BEL)	(Telenet–Fidea Lions)
Jersey awarded to the sprints classification winner	Sprints	Edward Planckaert (BEL)	(Sport Vlaanderen–Baloise)
	Team	Quick-Step Floors	

The 2018 VOO-Tour de Wallonie was a five-stage men's professional road cycling race, held in Belgium as a 2.HC race on the 2018 UCI Europe Tour. It was the forty-fifth running of the Tour de Wallonie, starting on 28 July in La Louvière and finishing on 1 August in Waremme.

== Schedule ==
List of stages and stage characteristics
Stage	Date	Course	Distance	Type	Winner
1	28 July	La Louvière to Les Bons Villers	193.4 km (120 mi)	Hilly stage	Romain Cardis (FRA)
2	29 July	Villers-la-Ville to Namur	167.2 km (104 mi)	Hilly stage	Tim Wellens (BEL)
3	30 July	Chimay to La Roche-en-Ardenne	169.2 km (105 mi)	Hilly stage	Odd Christian Eiking (NOR)
4	31 July	Malmedy to Herstal	161.4 km (100 mi)	Hilly stage	Quinten Hermans (BEL)
5	1 August	Huy to Waremme	187.5 km (117 mi)	Hilly stage	Jens Debusschere (BEL)

== Teams ==
Twenty teams entered the race. Each team had a maximum of seven riders:

UCI WorldTeams

- Lotto–Soudal
- Quick-Step Floors
- Team Dimension Data
- Team Katusha–Alpecin
- UAE Team Emirates
- Groupama–FDJ

UCI Professional Continental teams

- Aqua Blue Sport
- Cofidis
- Direct Énergie
- Roompot–Nederlandse Loterij
- Sport Vlaanderen–Baloise
- Fortuneo–Samsic
- Vérandas Willems–Crelan
- Vital Concept
- Wanty–Groupe Gobert
- WB Aqua Protect Veranclassic

UCI Continental teams

- AGO–Aqua Service
- Pauwels Sauzen–Vastgoedservice
- Roubaix–Lille Métropole
- Telenet–Fidea Lions

== Stages ==
=== Stage 1 ===
28 July 2018 — La Louvière to Les Bons Villers, 193.4 km (120.2 mi)

Result of stage 1
Rank	Rider	Team	Time
1	Romain Cardis (FRA)	Direct Énergie	4h 25' 57"
2	Michael Van Staeyen (BEL)	Cofidis	s.t.
3	Edward Planckaert (BEL)	Sport Vlaanderen–Baloise	s.t.
4	Vyacheslav Kuznetsov (RUS)	Team Katusha–Alpecin	s.t.
5	Jonas van Genechten (BEL)	Vital Concept	s.t.
6	Corné van Kessel (NED)	Telenet–Fidea Lions	s.t.
7	Nick van der Lijke (NED)	Roompot–Nederlandse Loterij	s.t.
8	Zico Waeytens (BEL)	Vérandas Willems–Crelan	s.t.
9	Hugo Hofstetter (FRA)	Cofidis	s.t.
10	Tom Wirtgen (LUX)	AGO–Aqua Service	s.t.

General classification after stage 1
Rank	Rider	Team	Time
1	Romain Cardis (FRA)	Direct Énergie	4h 25' 47"
2	Quinten Hermans (BEL)	Telenet–Fidea Lions	+ 3"
3	Michael Van Staeyen (BEL)	Cofidis	+ 4"
4	Edward Planckaert (BEL)	Sport Vlaanderen–Baloise	+ 6"
5	Steven Tronet (FRA)	Roubaix–Lille Métropole	+ 8"
6	Michael Boroš (CZE)	Pauwels Sauzen–Vastgoedservice	+ 9"
7	Vyacheslav Kuznetsov (RUS)	Team Katusha–Alpecin	+ 10"
8	Jonas van Genechten (BEL)	Vital Concept	+ 10"
9	Corné van Kessel (NED)	Telenet–Fidea Lions	+ 10"
10	Nick van der Lijke (NED)	Roompot–Nederlandse Loterij	+ 10"

=== Stage 2 ===
29 July 2018 — Villers-la-Ville to Namur, 167.2 km (103.9 mi)

Result of stage 2
Rank	Rider	Team	Time
1	Tim Wellens (BEL)	Lotto–Soudal	4h 06' 56"
2	Pieter Serry (BEL)	Quick-Step Floors	s.t.
3	Quentin Pacher (FRA)	Vital Concept	s.t.
4	Jhonatan Narváez (ECU)	Quick-Step Floors	s.t.
5	Odd Christian Eiking (NOR)	Wanty–Groupe Gobert	s.t.
6	Vyacheslav Kuznetsov (RUS)	Team Katusha–Alpecin	s.t.
7	Frederik Backaert (BEL)	Wanty–Groupe Gobert	s.t.
8	Fabio Aru (ITA)	UAE Team Emirates	s.t.
9	Kevin Deltombe (BEL)	Sport Vlaanderen–Baloise	s.t.
10	Enric Mas (ESP)	Quick-Step Floors	s.t.

General classification after stage 2
Rank	Rider	Team	Time
1	Tim Wellens (BEL)	Lotto–Soudal	8h 32' 42"
2	Pieter Serry (BEL)	Quick-Step Floors	+ 4"
3	Quentin Pacher (FRA)	Vital Concept	+ 6"
4	Vyacheslav Kuznetsov (RUS)	Team Katusha–Alpecin	+ 10"
5	Jhonatan Narváez (ECU)	Quick-Step Floors	+ 10"
6	Frederik Backaert (BEL)	Wanty–Groupe Gobert	+ 10"
7	Kevin Deltombe (BEL)	Sport Vlaanderen–Baloise	+ 10"
8	Romain Cardis (FRA)	Direct Énergie	+ 10"
9	Fabio Aru (ITA)	UAE Team Emirates	+ 10"
10	Tiago Machado (POR)	Team Katusha–Alpecin	+ 10"

=== Stage 3 ===
30 July 2018 — Chimay to La Roche-en-Ardenne, 169.2 km (105.1 mi)

Result of stage 3
Rank	Rider	Team	Time
1	Odd Christian Eiking (NOR)	Wanty–Groupe Gobert	3h 54' 44"
2	Quinten Hermans (BEL)	Telenet–Fidea Lions	+ 6"
3	Lorenzo Manzin (FRA)	Vital Concept	+ 6"
4	Jens Adams (BEL)	Pauwels Sauzen–Vastgoedservice	+ 6"
5	Jhonatan Narváez (ECU)	Quick-Step Floors	+ 6"
6	Pieter Serry (BEL)	Quick-Step Floors	+ 6"
7	Michel Kreder (NED)	Aqua Blue Sport	+ 6"
8	Tim Wellens (BEL)	Lotto–Soudal	+ 6"
9	Romain Le Roux (FRA)	Fortuneo–Samsic	+ 6"
10	Nick van der Lijke (NED)	Roompot–Nederlandse Loterij	+ 6"

General classification after stage 3
Rank	Rider	Team	Time
1	Tim Wellens (BEL)	Lotto–Soudal	12h 27' 33"
2	Pieter Serry (BEL)	Quick-Step Floors	+ 4"
3	Quentin Pacher (FRA)	Vital Concept	+ 6"
4	Quinten Hermans (BEL)	Telenet–Fidea Lions	+ 7"
5	Vyacheslav Kuznetsov (RUS)	Team Katusha–Alpecin	+ 10"
6	Jhonatan Narváez (ECU)	Quick-Step Floors	+ 10"
7	Frederik Backaert (BEL)	Wanty–Groupe Gobert	+ 10"
8	Fabio Aru (ITA)	UAE Team Emirates	+ 10"
9	Tiago Machado (POR)	Team Katusha–Alpecin	+ 10"
10	James Knox (GBR)	Quick-Step Floors	+ 10"

=== Stage 4 ===
31 July 2018 — Malmedy to Herstal, 161.4 km (100.3 mi)

Result of stage 4
Rank	Rider	Team	Time
1	Quinten Hermans (BEL)	Telenet–Fidea Lions	3h 46' 58"
2	Lorenzo Manzin (FRA)	Vital Concept	s.t.
3	Romain Cardis (FRA)	Direct Énergie	s.t.
4	Pieter Serry (BEL)	Quick-Step Floors	s.t.
5	Edward Planckaert (BEL)	Sport Vlaanderen–Baloise	s.t.
6	Huub Duijn (NED)	Vérandas Willems–Crelan	s.t.
7	Nick van der Lijke (NED)	Roompot–Nederlandse Loterij	s.t.
8	Dorian Godon (FRA)	Cofidis	s.t.
9	Kevin Deltombe (BEL)	Sport Vlaanderen–Baloise	s.t.
10	Floris Gerts (NED)	Roompot–Nederlandse Loterij	s.t.

General classification after stage 4
Rank	Rider	Team	Time
1	Quinten Hermans (BEL)	Telenet–Fidea Lions	16h 14' 28"
2	Tim Wellens (BEL)	Lotto–Soudal	+ 3"
3	Pieter Serry (BEL)	Quick-Step Floors	+ 7"
4	Quentin Pacher (FRA)	Vital Concept	+ 9"
5	Jhonatan Narváez (ECU)	Quick-Step Floors	+ 13"
6	Vyacheslav Kuznetsov (RUS)	Team Katusha–Alpecin	+ 13"
7	Lorenzo Manzin (FRA)	Vital Concept	+ 13"
8	Frederik Backaert (BEL)	Wanty–Groupe Gobert	+ 13"
9	Fabio Aru (ITA)	UAE Team Emirates	+ 13"
10	Tiago Machado (POR)	Team Katusha–Alpecin	+ 13"

=== Stage 5 ===
1 August 2018 — Huy to Waremme, 187.5 km (116.5 mi)

Result of stage 5
Rank	Rider	Team	Time
1	Jens Debusschere (BEL)	Lotto–Soudal	3h 46' 58"
2	Álvaro José Hodeg (COL)	Quick-Step Floors	s.t.
3	Ryan Gibbons (RSA)	Team Dimension Data	s.t.
4	Quinten Hermans (BEL)	Telenet–Fidea Lions	s.t.
5	Bram Welten (NED)	Fortuneo–Samsic	s.t.
6	Edward Planckaert (BEL)	Sport Vlaanderen–Baloise	s.t.
7	Hugo Hofstetter (FRA)	Cofidis	s.t.
8	Kenny Dehaes (BEL)	WB Aqua Protect Veranclassic	s.t.
9	Daniel Hoelgaard (NOR)	Groupama–FDJ	s.t.
10	Romain Cardis (FRA)	Direct Énergie	s.t.

Final general classification
Rank	Rider	Team	Time
1	Tim Wellens (BEL)	Lotto–Soudal	20h 22' 26"
2	Quinten Hermans (BEL)	Telenet–Fidea Lions	s.t.
3	Pieter Serry (BEL)	Quick-Step Floors	+ 7"
4	Quentin Pacher (FRA)	Vital Concept	+ 9"
5	Jhonatan Narváez (ECU)	Quick-Step Floors	+ 11"
6	James Knox (GBR)	Quick-Step Floors	+ 12"
7	Vyacheslav Kuznetsov (RUS)	Team Katusha–Alpecin	+ 13"
8	Lorenzo Manzin (FRA)	Vital Concept	+ 13"
9	Frederik Backaert (BEL)	Wanty–Groupe Gobert	+ 13"
10	Fabio Aru (ITA)	UAE Team Emirates	+ 13"

== Classification leadership table ==
In the 2018 Tour de Wallonie, five different jerseys were awarded. The general classification was calculated by adding each cyclist's finishing times on each stage, and allowing time bonuses for the first three finishers at intermediate sprints (three seconds to first, two seconds to second and one second to third) and at the finish of all stages to the first three finishers: the stage winner won a ten-second bonus, with six and four seconds for the second and third riders respectively. The leader of the classification received a yellow jersey; it was considered the most important of the 2018 Tour de Wallonie, and the winner of the classification was considered the winner of the race.

Points for the mountains classification
Position	1	2	3	4	5
Points for Category 1	10	8	6	4	2
Points for Category 2	6	4	2	0	

There was also a mountains classification, the leadership of which was marked by a white jersey. In the mountains classification, points towards the classification were won by reaching the top of a climb before other cyclists. Each climb was categorised as either first, or second-category, with more points available for the higher-categorised climbs.

Points for the points classification
Position	1	2	3	4	5	6	7	8	9	10
Stage finishes	25	20	15	10	8	6	4	3	2	1

Additionally, there was a points classification, which awarded a green jersey. In the points classification, cyclists received points for finishing in the top 10 in a stage. For winning a stage, a rider earned 25 points, with 20 for second, 15 for third, 10 for fourth and so on, down to 1 point for 10th place. There was also a separate classification for the intermediate sprints, rewarding a purple jersey. Points towards the classification were accrued – awarded on a 5–3–1 scale – at intermediate sprint points during each stage; these intermediate sprints also offered bonus seconds towards the general classification as noted above.

Finally, the leader in the classification for young riders, wore a red bib number. This was decided the same way as the general classification, but only riders born after 28 July 1995 were eligible to be ranked in the classification. There was also a team classification, in which the times of the best three cyclists per team on each stage were added together; the leading team at the end of the race was the team with the lowest total time.

Stage	Winner	General classification	Points classification	Mountains classification	Young rider classification	Sprints classification	Teams classification	Combativity award
1	Romain Cardis	Romain Cardis	Romain Cardis	Quinten Hermans	Quinten Hermans	Lionel Taminiaux	Cofidis	Conor Dunne
2	Tim Wellens	Tim Wellens	Tim Wellens	Nicolas Cleppe	Jhonatan Narváez	Kasper Asgreen	Quick-Step Floors	Lachlan Morton
3	Odd Christian Eiking	Tim Wellens	Odd Christian Eiking	Nicolas Cleppe	Quinten Hermans	Edward Planckaert	Quick-Step Floors	Daan Soete
4	Quinten Hermans	Quinten Hermans	Quinten Hermans	Nicolas Cleppe	Quinten Hermans	Edward Planckaert	Quick-Step Floors	Etienne van Empel
5	Jens Debusschere	Tim Wellens	Quinten Hermans	Nicolas Cleppe	Quinten Hermans	Edward Planckaert	Quick-Step Floors	James Knox
Final		Tim Wellens	Quinten Hermans	Nicolas Cleppe	Quinten Hermans	Edward Planckaert	Quick-Step Floors	No final award

- In stage two, Michael Van Staeyen, who was second in the points classification, wore the green jersey, because first placed Romain Cardis wore the yellow jersey as leader of the general classification.
- In stage three, Romain Cardis, who was second in the points classification, wore the green jersey, because first placed Tim Wellens wore the yellow jersey as leader of the general classification.
- In stage five, Romain Cardis, who was second in the points classification, wore the green jersey, because first placed Quinten Hermans wore the yellow jersey as leader of the general classification.
