= 2007 Hel van het Mergelland =

Race details
- Dates: 7 April 2007
- Stages: 1
- Distance: 187.5 km (116.5 mi)
- Winning time: 4h 46' 02"

Results
| | Winner | Nico Sijmens (BEL) |
| | Second | Sergey Lagutin (UKR) |
| | Third | Niki Terpstra (NED) |

The 2007 Hel van het Mergelland was the 34th edition of the Volta Limburg Classic cycle race and was held on 7 April 2007. The race started and finished in Eijsden. The race was won by Nico Sijmens.

== General classification ==
Final general classification

| Rank | Rider | Time |
|---|---|---|
| 1 | Nico Sijmens (BEL) | 4h 46' 02" |
| 2 | Sergey Lagutin (UKR) | + 1" |
| 3 | Niki Terpstra (NED) | + 1" |
| 4 | Preben Van Hecke (BEL) | + 3" |
| 5 | Björn Glasner (GER) | + 5" |
| 6 | Josep Jufré (ESP) | + 7" |
| 7 | Michael Blaudzun (DEN) | + 7" |
| 8 | Jean-Paul Simon (BEL) | + 7" |
| 9 | Jelle Vanendert (BEL) | + 7" |
| 10 | Robert Gesink (NED) | + 7" |
