= 2006 Hel van het Mergelland =

Race details
- Dates: 1 April 2006
- Stages: 1
- Distance: 188.6 km (117.2 mi)
- Winning time: 5h 01' 29"

Results
	Winner	Mikhaylo Khalilov (UKR)
	Second	Martijn Maaskant (NED)
	Third	Bert Scheirlinckx (BEL)

The 2006 Hel van het Mergelland was the 33rd edition of the Volta Limburg Classic cycle race and was held on 1 April 2006. The race started and finished in Eijsden. The race was won by Mikhaylo Khalilov.

== General classification ==
Final general classification

Rank	Rider	Time
1	Mikhaylo Khalilov (UKR)	5h 01' 29"
2	Martijn Maaskant (NED)	+ 0"
3	Bert Scheirlinckx (BEL)	+ 1"
4	Thomas Berkhout (NED)	+ 3"
5	Floris Goesinnen (NED)	+ 3"
6	Valery Kobzarenko (UKR)	+ 10"
7	Steven Kleynen (BEL)	+ 46"
8	Igor Abakoumov (BEL)	+ 1' 24"
9	Sergey Lagutin (UZB)	+ 1' 24"
10	Nico Sijmens (BEL)	+ 1' 24"
