= Marc Streel =

Belgian cyclist

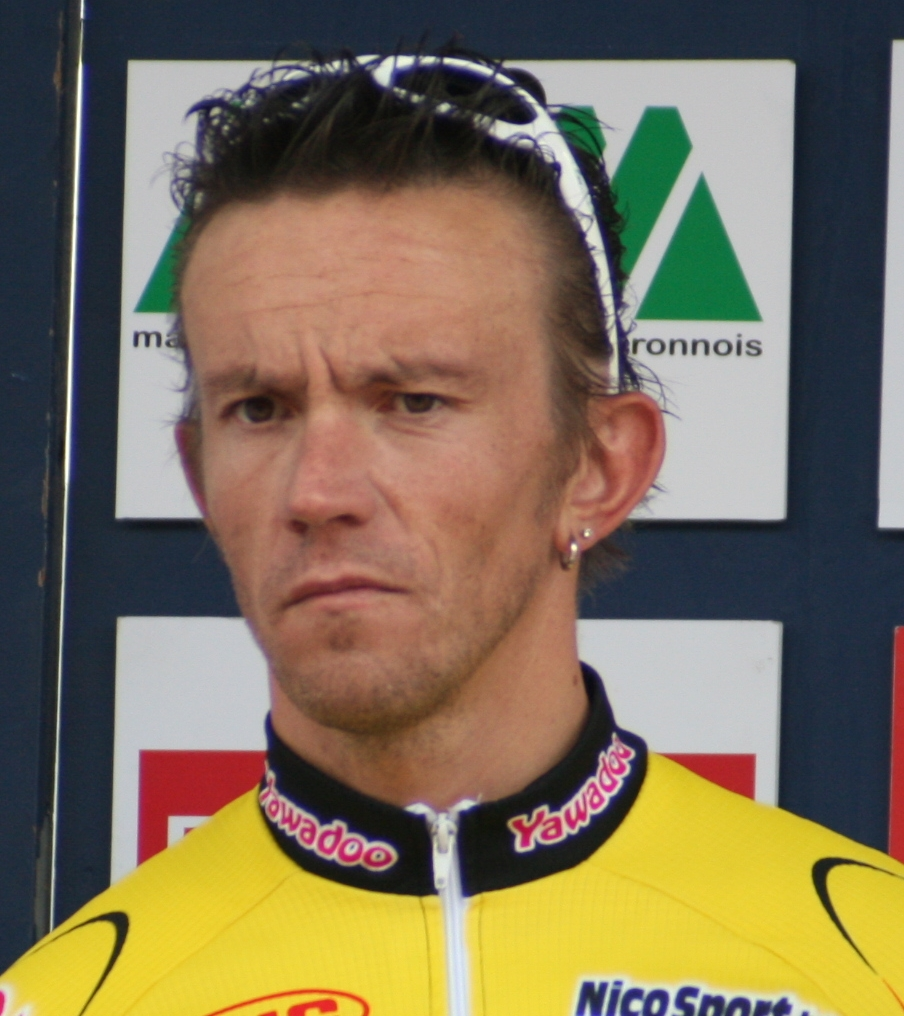

Personal information
- Born: 12 August 1971 (age 55) Waremme, Belgium

Cycling career
- Sport: Cycling
- Current team: Retired
- Discipline: Road
- Role: Rider
- Rider type: Time trialist

Professional teams
- 1994: Collstrop–Willy Naessens
- 1995–1996: Tönissteiner–Saxon
- 1997–1998: Casino
- 1999: home–Jack & Jones
- 2000: Ville de Charleroi–New Systems
- 2000–2001: Collstrop–De Federale Verzekeringen
- 2002–2004: Landbouwkrediet–Colnago
- 2006: Pôle Continental Wallon–Bergasol–Euro Millions
- 2007: Palmans–Collstrop

Marc Streel (born 12 August 1971) is a Belgian former racing cyclist.

== Major results ==
1993
2nd Overall Tour de Liège
1994
3rd Duo Normand (with Peter Verbeken)
1996
1st Flèche Hesbignonne
1st Stage 3 Tour de Picardie
2nd Boucle de l'Artois
2nd Overall Circuit Franco-Belge

1st Stage 2

3rd Overall Circuit de Lorraine

1st Stage 8

1997
1st Time trial, National Road Championships
2nd Grand Prix de Rennes
2nd Grand Prix des Nations
1998
1st Danmark Rundt

1st Stages 1 & 4b

1st Stage 4 Tour de Wallonie
2nd Overall Circuit de la Sarthe
3rd Overall Tour du Poitou-Charentes

1st Stage 4

3rd Grand Prix des Nations
1999
1st Time trial, National Road Championships
1st Grote Prijs Jef Scherens
2nd Overall Tour de Wallonie

1st Prologue

2nd Grand Prix Eddy Merckx (with Jesper Skibby)
2nd Tour de Picardie
2000
1st Stage 4 Tour de Wallonie
2nd Flèche Hesbignonne
2nd Time trial, National Road Championships
2001
1st Stage 5 Peace Race
2002
2nd Kampioenschap van Vlaanderen
3rd Druivenkoers Overijse
2004
1st Stage 2 Four Days of Dunkirk
