= 2005 Hel van het Mergelland =

Race details
- Dates: 2 April 2005
- Stages: 1
- Distance: 188.6 km (117.2 mi)
- Winning time: 4h 45' 52"

Results
	Winner	Nico Sijmens (BEL)
	Second	Stefan Schumacher (GER)
	Third	Maarten Wynants (BEL)

The 2005 Hel van het Mergelland was the 32nd edition of the Volta Limburg Classic cycle race and was held on 2 April 2005. The race started and finished in Eijsden. The race was won by Nico Sijmens.

== General classification ==
Final general classification

Rank	Rider	Time
1	Nico Sijmens (BEL)	4h 45' 52"
2	Stefan Schumacher (GER)	+ 0"
3	Maarten Wynants (BEL)	+ 0"
4	Sven Renders (BEL)	+ 0"
5	Jos Lucassen (NED)	+ 0"
6	Jens Heppner (GER)	+ 3"
7	Steven Kleynen (BEL)	+ 3"
8	Dennis Haueisen (GER)	+ 3"
9	Laurens ten Dam (NED)	+ 12"
10	Yanto Barker (GBR)	+ 24"
