= Romain Cardis =

French bicycle racer

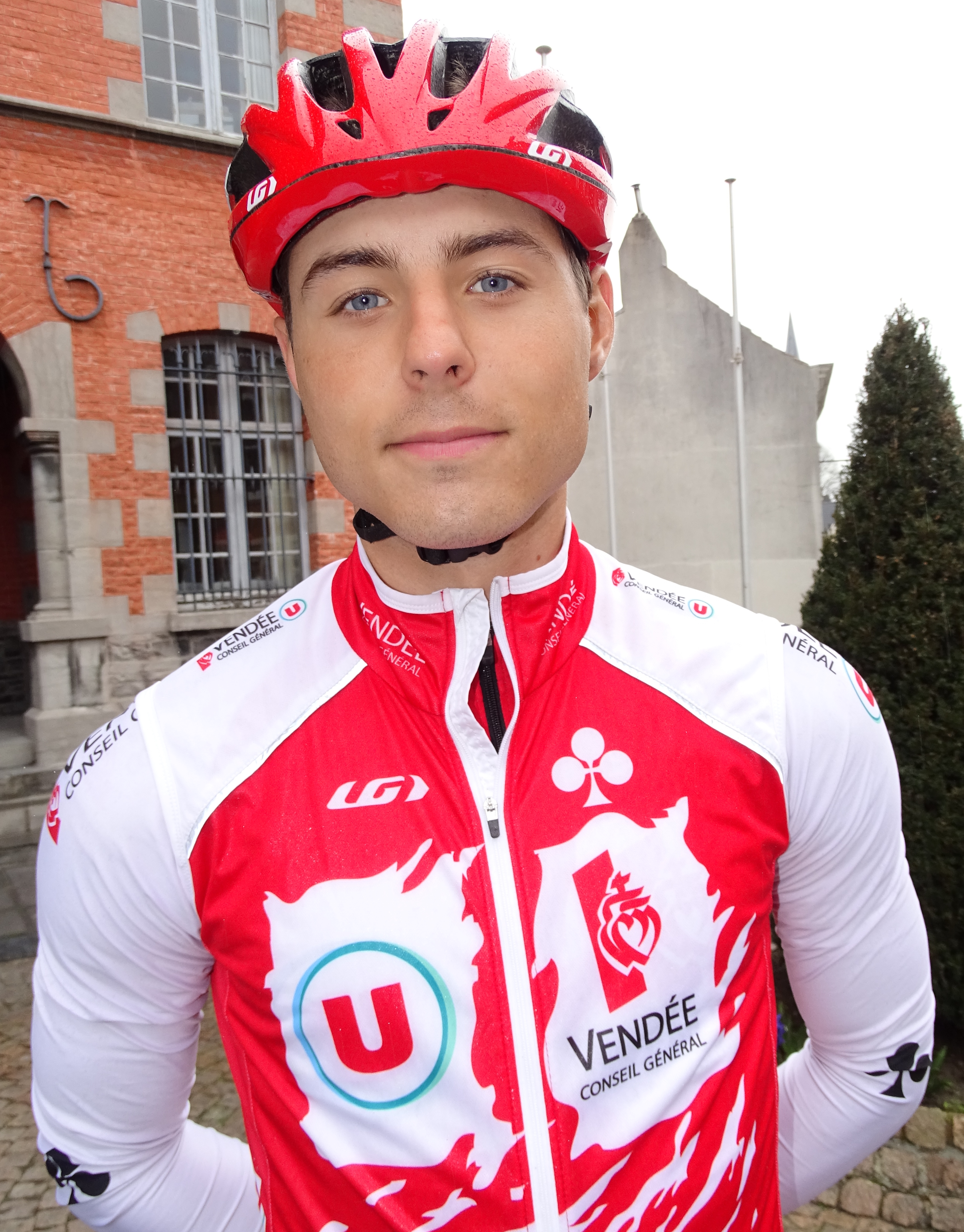
- Cardis in 2015.

Personal information
- Full name: Romain Cardis
- Born: 12 August 1992 (age 34) Melun, France
- Height: 1.81 m (5 ft 11 in)
- Weight: 75 kg (165 lb)

Cycling career
- Sport: Cycling
- Current team: St. Michel–Preference Home–Auber93
- Discipline: Road
- Role: Rider

Amateur teams
- 2009–2010: EV Angers Doutre
- 2011: Véranda Rideau Sarthe
- 2012–2015: Vendée U

Professional teams
- 2014: Team Europcar (stagiaire)
- 2016–2020: Direct Énergie
- 2021–: St. Michel–Auber93

Romain Cardis (born 12 August 1992 in Melun) is a French cyclist, who currently rides for UCI Continental team St. Michel–Preference Home–Auber93. He was named in the startlist for the 2016 Vuelta a España.

== Major results ==
2014
5th Primus Classic Impanis-Van Petegem
2015
1st Overall Tour du Loir-et-Cher

1st Points classification
1st Young rider classification
1st Stages 2 & 4

10th Overall Tour de Gironde
2017
4th Grand Prix de la Somme
6th Primus Classic
2018
1st Stage 1 Tour de Wallonie
2019
8th Omloop van het Houtland
10th Grand Prix de Denain
2020
2nd Grand Prix d'Isbergues
10th Scheldeprijs
2021
1st Paris–Troyes
4th Grand Prix de la ville de Pérenchies
7th Grand Prix d'Isbergues
8th Grand Prix du Morbihan
9th Cholet-Pays de la Loire
10th Boucles de l'Aulne
2022
8th Overall Circuit de la Sarthe
9th Overall Four Days of Dunkirk
9th Grand Prix d'Isbergues
9th Grand Prix de la ville de Nogent-sur-Oise
2023
4th Cholet-Pays de la Loire
4th Grand Prix de la ville de Pérenchies
8th Classic Loire Atlantique
9th Grand-Prix de Plouay
10th Overall Région Pays de la Loire Tour
10th Grand Prix du Morbihan
2025
9th Cholet Agglo Tour

=== Grand Tour general classification results timeline ===
Grand Tour	2016
Giro d'Italia	—
Tour de France	—
Vuelta a España	148

Legend
—	Did not compete
DNF	Did not finish
