= Volta Limburg Classic =

Dutch one-day road cycling race

Race details
- Date: Early April
- Region: Limburg, Netherlands
- Local name: Hel van het Mergelland (in Dutch)
- Discipline: Road
- Competition: UCI Europe Tour
- Type: One-day race
- Web site: www.nxtclassic.nl

Men's race
- First edition: 1973
- Editions: 51 (as of 2026)
- First winner: Jan Spijker (NED)
- Most wins: Raymond Meijs (NED) (4 wins)
- Most recent: Tibor Del Grosso (NED)

Women's race
- First edition: 2017
- Editions: 8 (as of 2026)
- First winner: Karol-Ann Canuel (CAN)
- Most wins: no repeat winners
- Most recent: Anna Vanderaerden (BEL)

The Volta Limburg Classic is a single-day road bicycle race held annually in late March or early April in Limburg, Netherlands. Since 2005, the race has been organized as a 1.1 event on the UCI Europe Tour.

The race is officially called the "NXT Classic" since the 2024 edition, but is still sometimes referred to its older official names the Volta Limburg and De hel van het Mergelland ("The hell of the Mergelland").

On April 4, 2026, the race will be held for the 51st time for men, the eighth time for women.

== Winners ==
=== Men's race ===
Year	Country	Rider	Team
1973	Netherlands	Jan Spijker	
1974	Netherlands	Toine van de Bunder	
1975	Netherlands	Wil van Helvoirt	
1976	Netherlands	Mathieu Dohmen	
1977	Netherlands	Toine van de Bunder	
1978	Netherlands	Toine van de Bunder	
1979	Netherlands	Herman Snoeyink	
1980	Netherlands	Pim Bosch	
1981	Netherlands	René Koppert	
1982	Netherlands	Peter Hofland	
1983	Netherlands	Jan Peels	
1984	Netherlands	Chris Koppert	
1985	Netherlands	Stephan Räkers	
1986	Netherlands	Marc van Orsouw	
1987	Netherlands	Tom Cordes	
1988	Netherlands	Gerrit Möhlmann	
1989	Netherlands	Willem-Jan van Loenhout	
1990	Netherlands	Raymond Meijs	
1991	Netherlands	Rob Compas	
1992	Netherlands	Martin van Steen	
1993	Belgium	Erwin Thijs	Collstrop–Assur Carpets
1994	Netherlands	John van den Akker	Collstrop-Willy Naessens
1995	Netherlands	Max van Heeswijk	Motorola
1996	Netherlands	Lucien de Louw	Foreldorado-Golff
1997	Netherlands	Raymond Meijs	Foreldorado-Golff
1998	Netherlands	Raymond Meijs	Gerolsteiner
1999	Netherlands	Raymond Meijs	Cologne
2000	Germany	Bert Grabsch	Cologne
2001	No race		
2002	Australia	Corey Sweet	BankGiroLoterij–Batavus
2003	Belgium	Wim van Huffel	Vlaanderen T-Interim
2004	Denmark	Allan Johansen	BankGiroLoterij
2005	Belgium	Nico Sijmens	Landbouwkrediet–Colnago
2006	Ukraine	Mikhaylo Khalilov	Team LPR
2007	Belgium	Nico Sijmens	Landbouwkrediet–Tönissteiner
2008	Germany	Tony Martin	Team High Road
2009	Italy	Mauro Finetto	CSF Group–Navigare
2010	France	Yann Huguet	Skil–Shimano
2011	Netherlands	Pim Ligthart	Vacansoleil–DCM
2012	Russia	Pavel Brutt	Team Katusha
2013	Germany	Rüdiger Selig	Team Katusha
2014	Netherlands	Moreno Hofland	Belkin Pro Cycling
2015	Switzerland	Stefan Küng	BMC Racing Team
2016	Netherlands	Floris Gerts	BMC Racing Team
2017	Italy	Marco Canola	Nippo–Vini Fantini
2018	Slovenia	Jan Tratnik	CCC–Sprandi–Polkowice
2019	Switzerland	Patrick Müller	Vital Concept–B&B Hotels
2020–2021	No race due to the COVID-19 pandemic		
2022	Belgium	Arnaud de Lie	Lotto–Soudal
2023	Australia	Kaden Groves	Alpecin–Deceuninck
2024	Belgium	Timo Kielich	Alpecin–Deceuninck
2025	New Zealand	Dion Smith	Intermarché–Wanty
2026	Netherlands	Tibor Del Grosso	Alpecin–Premier Tech

=== Women's race ===
Year	Country	Rider	Team
2017	Canada	Karol-Ann Canuel	Boels–Dolmans
2018	Netherlands	Belle de Gast	Parkhotel Valkenburg
2019	Netherlands	Demi Vollering	Parkhotel Valkenburg
2020–2021	No race due to the COVID-19 pandemic		
2022	Netherlands	Amber Kraak	Team Jumbo–Visma
2023	Netherlands	Mischa Bredewold	SD Worx
2024	Netherlands	Femke Markus	Team SD Worx–Protime
2025	Netherlands	Femke Gerritse	Dutch National Team
2026	Belgium	Anna Vanderaerden	Fenix–Premier Tech Development Team
