= Adam Hansen =

Australian road bicycle racer

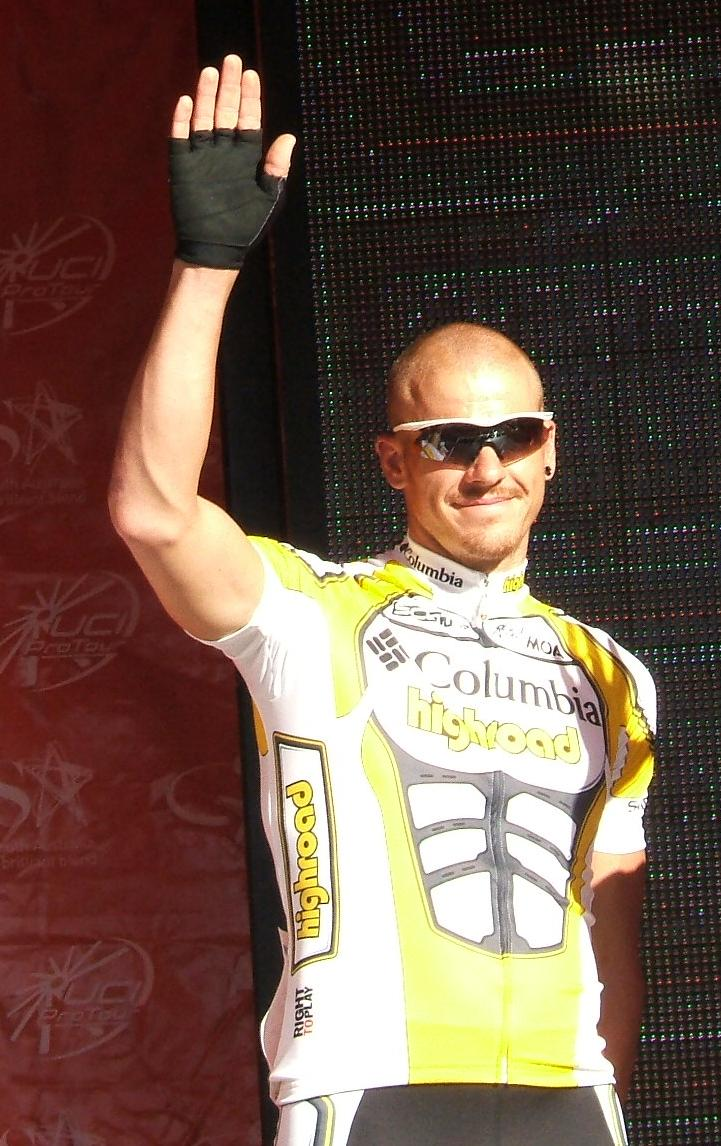
- Hansen at the 2009 Tour Down Under.

Personal information
- Full name: Adam James Hansen
- Nicknames: Croc Man, Lumpy
- Born: 11 May 1981 (age 45) Southport, Queensland, Australia
- Height: 1.86 m (6 ft 1 in)
- Weight: 77 kg (170 lb)

Cycling career
- Sport: Cycling
- Current team: Retired
- Disciplines: Road; Mountain biking
- Role: Rider
- Rider type: Breakaway specialist

Amateur teams
- 2003: Arboe Mérida
- 2004: Corratec Austria
- 2005: ELK Haus
- 2006: Aposport Krone Linz
- 2021: Leomo Bellmare Racing Team

Professional teams
- 2007–2010: T-Mobile Team
- 2011–2020: Omega Pharma–Lotto
- 2022–2023: WSA KTM Graz p/b Leomo

Major wins
- Grand Tours Giro d'Italia 1 individual stage (2013) Vuelta a España 1 individual stage (2014) Stage races Ster Elektrotoer (2010) One-day races and Classics National Time Trial Championships (2008)

Adam James Hansen (born 11 May 1981) is an Australian Ironman triathlete and former professional road bicycle racer, who rode professionally in the latter between 2007 and 2020, and also from 2022 to 2023. During his cycling career, he took five victories – including Grand Tour stage wins at the 2013 Giro d'Italia and the 2014 Vuelta a España, which came during a record run of twenty consecutive Grand Tour starts, and finishes, from 2011 to 2018.

In March 2023, he was elected president of the Cyclistes Professionnels Associés (CPA), an international non-profit association that safeguards the interests of the professional riders, becoming the first CPA president born outside Europe.

== Career ==
Hansen was born in Southport, Queensland, and turned professional in 2007, working with Dr. Lothar Heinrich of the University of Freiburg. In 2012, Hansen became the second Australian to complete all three Grand Tours – the Giro d'Italia, the Tour de France and the Vuelta a España – in a calendar year. He was the only rider to accomplish that feat in 2012, and the 32nd in cycling history. It was after Stage 12 of the Giro that he discovered he had broken his sternum approximately two weeks previous, however since it was healing he continued racing. While he had free rein at the Giro, for the Tour he had to work for André Greipel (to win sprints) and Jurgen Van den Broeck (to achieve a good General Classification position).

In 2013, Hansen broke away early in the seventh stage of the Giro d'Italia, a stage featuring numerous short and steep climbs. Hansen shed his breakaway companions and won in solo fashion in Pescara in pouring rain, more than a minute in advance of the chasing group. In stage 19 of the 2014 Vuelta a España, Hansen attacked the peloton with 4 kilometres (2.5 miles) to go and resisted the disorganised chase to win solo. In completing the 2015 Vuelta a España, his thirteenth grand tour in a row, he broke Bernardo Ruiz's 57-year-old record for consecutive grand tours completed. By completing the 2018 Giro d'Italia, he extended his own record becoming the only rider to complete 20 consecutive Grand Tours. The streak ended at 20, as Hansen did not take part in the 2018 Tour de France.

As a software engineer, Hansen has designed his own shoes and ridden with them on numerous occasions. He has also written software for his Lotto–Soudal team, which manages their logistics.

After Lotto–Soudal opted not to extend Hansen's contract beyond the end of 2020, in October of that year he announced that he would focus on Ironman Triathlons in 2021, having previously competed in Ironman Florida in 2019. He ended his World Tour cycling career having finished 26 Grand Tours of the 29 he started.

In 2022, Hansen signed for Austrian Continental team WSA KTM Graz p/b Leomo.

== Personal life ==
He has been living in Frýdlant nad Ostravicí, Czech Republic since 2004, and is a vegan.

== Major results ==
2004
1st Overall Crocodile Trophy
1st Burgenland Rundfahrt
1st Grosser Preis um den Deutschlandsberg
2005
1st Overall Crocodile Trophy
1st Wien-Lassnitzhöhe
2006
1st Grand Prix Bradlo
1st Lavanttaler Radsporttage
2nd Road race, National Road Championships
2nd Salzkammergut Giro
2nd Giro del Mendrisiotto
10th Overall Giro della Regione Friuli Venezia Giulia
2007
6th Le Samyn
2008
National Road Championships

1st Time trial
2nd Road race

2nd Hel van het Mergelland
2009
3rd Road race, National Road Championships
2010
1st Overall Ster Elektrotoer

1st Stage 4

2012
4th Road race, National Road Championships
2013
1st Stage 7 Giro d'Italia
2014
1st Stage 19 Vuelta a España
9th Overall Tour Down Under

1st Mountains classification

9th Overall Tour of Turkey
2015
9th Overall Tour of Turkey
2016
5th Overall Presidential Tour of Turkey

=== Grand Tour general classification results timeline ===
Grand Tour	2007	2008	2009	2010	2011	2012	2013	2014	2015	2016	2017	2018	2019	2020
Giro d'Italia	DNF	108	—	DNF	—	94	72	73	77	68	93	60	68	117
Tour de France	—	108	—	DNF	—	81	72	64	114	100	113	—	—	—
/ Vuelta a España	89	—	94	—	129	123	60	53	55	110	95	—	—	—

Legend
—	Did not compete
DNF	Did not finish
