= Piotr Wadecki =

Polish racing cyclist

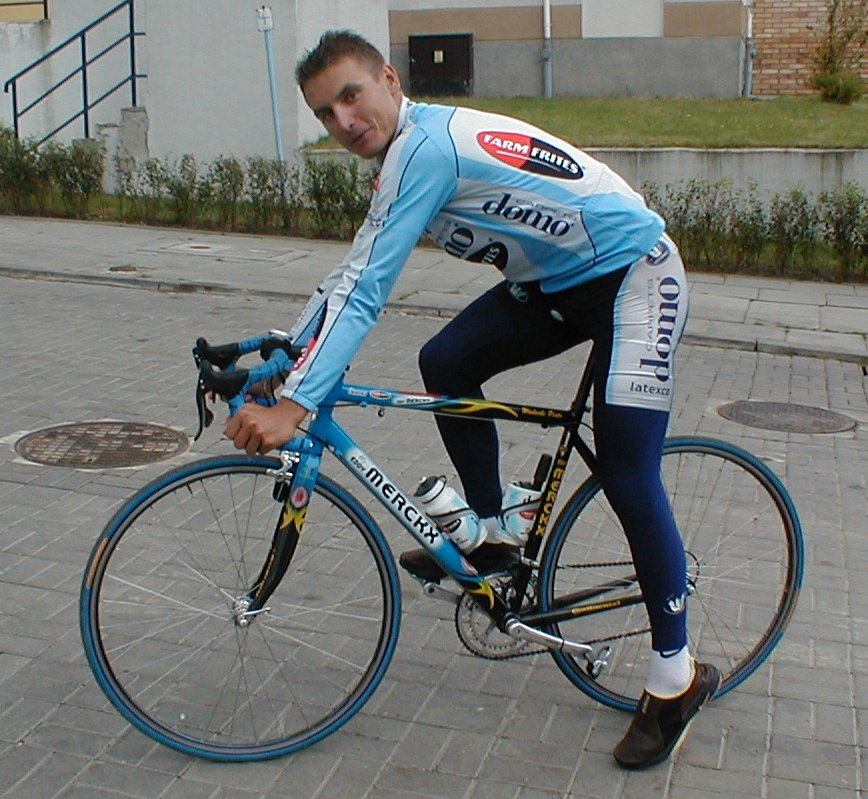

Personal information
- Full name: Piotr Wadecki
- Born: 11 February 1973 (age 53) Elbląg, Poland
- Height: 1.78 m (5 ft 10 in)
- Weight: 70 kg (154 lb; 11 st 0 lb)

Cycling career
- Sport: Cycling
- Discipline: Road
- Role: Rider; Directeur sportif; General manager
- Rider type: All-rounder

Professional teams
- 1997–2000: Mróz
- 2001–2002: Domo–Farm Frites–Latexco
- 2003: Quick-Step–Davitamon
- 2004: Lotto–Domo
- 2005: Action–Ati
- 2006: CCC–Polsat

Managerial teams
- 2009–2018: CCC–Polsat–Polkowice
- 2019–2020: CCC Team

Major wins
- Stage races Peace Race (1998, 2000) One-day races and Classics National Road Race Championships (1997, 2000) National Time Trial Championships (2000)

Piotr Wadecki (born 11 February 1973) is a Polish former professional road racing cyclist, who last worked as the general manager of UCI WorldTeam CCC Team.

== Team membership ==
A professional from 1997, Wadecki has been a member of the following professional teams: Mróz(-Supradyn Witamin) (1997–2000), Domo–Farm Frites/Lotto Domo (now Predictor–Lotto) (2001–2002), Quick-Step–Davitamon (2003), Lotto–Domo (2004), Intel–Action (2005), and CCC Polsat (2006).

== Biography ==
In 2000, Wadecki won 15 victories in races counted under the Union Cycliste Internationale's points scheme .

On 15 March 2002, Wadecki was seriously injured in a final sprint in stage 1 (Massa Lubrense-Sorrento, 124 km) of the 37th Tirreno–Adriatico. He suffered skull fractures and a broken wrist.

When transferring from Lotto–Domo to Intel–Action, in 2005, Wadecki was ranked second place in the world. He had achieved a total of 32 wins thus far. While in the Intel–Action Team, Wadecki competed in both the Giro d'Italia and Tour de France.

== Major results ==
1991
1st Overall Coupe du Président de la Ville de Grudziądz
1993
2nd Overall Course de la Solidarité Olympique
1994
2nd Overall Circuit des Mines
5th Overall Tour de Pologne
1996
1st Overall Tour de Martinique
2nd Grand Prix Cristal Energie
1997
1st Road race, National Road Championships
1st Overall Course de la Solidarité Olympique

1st Stages 1 & 3

1st Stage 1 Bałtyk–Karkonosze Tour
4th CoreStates Invitational
5th Overall Tour of Japan

1st Stage 5

9th Grand Prix de Denain
1998
3rd Overall Peace Race
9th Overall Tour de Langkawi
1999
1st Overall Szlakiem Grodów Piastowskich

1st Stage 2

1st Stage 11 Volta a Portugal
1st Memorial A. Kacziny
2nd Overall Bałtyk–Karkonosze Tour

1st Stages 3, 5 & 6

5th Overall Tour de Pologne

1st Stage 5

2000
National Road Championships

1st Road race
1st Time trial

1st Overall Peace Race
1st Overall Szlakiem Grodów Piastowskich

1st Stages 1, 2 & 6b

1st First Union Wilmington Classic
1st Stage 4 Bałtyk–Karkonosze Tour
2nd Overall Tour de Pologne

1st Stage 1

2nd Overall Tour of Japan

1st Stage 2

3rd Overall Tour d'Egypte

1st Stages 4, 5 & 6

7th Road race, Summer Olympics
8th Hel van het Mergelland
2001
1st Stage 5 Paris–Nice
2nd Overall Giro della Provincia di Lucca

1st Stage 2

6th Road race, UCI Road World Championships
7th Clásica de San Sebastián
8th GP Industria & Commercio di Prato
2002
2nd Overall Tour de Suisse
6th Trofeo Luis Puig
2003
2nd Overall Tour de Luxembourg
8th Classique des Alpes
9th Rund um Köln
2005
1st Overall Course de la Solidarité Olympique

1st Stage 2

1st Pomorski Klasyk
3rd Overall Hessen Rundfahrt

1st Stage 2

3rd Druivenkoers Overijse
6th Overall Giro del Capo
