= Steven Kleynen =

Belgian cyclist

Personal information
- Born: 22 December 1977 (age 48) Leuven, Belgium

Cycling career
- Sport: Cycling
- Current team: Retired
- Discipline: Road
- Role: Rider

Amateur team
- 1999: TVM–Farm Frites (stagiaire)

Professional teams
- 2000: Farm Frites
- 2001–2002: Domo–Farm Frites–Latexco
- 2003–2005: Vlaanderen–T Interim
- 2006–2008: Landbouwkrediet–Colnago

Steven Kleynen (born 22 December 1977) is a Belgian former cyclist.

== Major results ==
1999
9th Under-23 World Road Race Championships
2000
1st Stage 2 Tour of Bohemia
2001
6th GP du canton d'Argovie
7th Grand Prix de Wallonie
2003
1st Overall Circuito Montañés
2005
7th Hel van het Mergelland
8th Clásica de Almería
9th Overall Sachsen-Tour
2006
7th Hel van het Mergelland
8th Overall Rheinland-Pfalz Rundfahrt

=== Grand Tour general classification results timeline ===
Grand Tour	2000	2001	2002
Giro d'Italia	—	—	—
Tour de France	—	—	—
Vuelta a España	54	67	26

Legend
—	Did not compete
DNF	Did not finish
