= Andy De Smet =

Belgian cyclist (born 1970)

Personal information
- Born: 4 March 1970 (age 56) Waregem, Belgium

Cycling career
- Sport: Cycling
- Current team: Retired
- Discipline: Road
- Role: Rider

Amateur team
- 1995: Asfra Racing Team (stagiaire)

Professional teams
- 1996–1999: Ipso–Asfra
- 2000: Spar–OKI
- 2001: Ville de Charleroi–New Systems
- 2002–2003: Palmans–Collstrop
- 2004: Mr. Bookmaker–Palmans–Collstrop
- 2005: Team Skil–Moser

Andy De Smet (born 4 March 1970) is a Belgian former professional road cyclist.

== Major results ==
1993
1st Vlaamse Pijl
1995
1st Zellik–Galmaarden
2nd Omloop Het Nieuwsblad Beloften
1996
1st Stadsprijs Geraardsbergen
3rd Grote 1-MeiPrijs
9th GP Stad Zottegem
1997
5th Schaal Sels
5th Brussels–Ingooigem
5th Nokere Koerse
1998
1st Stages 1a & 7 Herald Sun Tour
6th Grote Prijs Jef Scherens
6th GP Stad Zottegem
7th Omloop van de Vlaamse Scheldeboorden
1999
1st Omloop van de Gouden Garnaal
7th Nokere Koerse
2000
1st Overall Ster ZLM Toer
1st Ronde van Drenthe
2nd Ronde van Noord-Holland
2nd Grote Prijs Jef Scherens
3rd Overall Herald Sun Tour
3rd Leeuwse Pijl
5th Omloop van het Waasland
6th GP Stad Zottegem
9th Schaal Sels
2001
1st Stage 4 Tour of Rhodes
2002
2nd Ronde van Drenthe
5th Vlaamse Havenpijl
2003
5th Omloop van het Waasland
7th Memorial Rik Van Steenbergen
9th Brussels–Ingooigem
9th GP S.A.T.S.
10th GP Rudy Dhaenens
2004
7th Kampioenschap van Vlaanderen
2005
2nd Kampioenschap van Vlaanderen
2nd Ronde van Noord-Holland
