= 2003 Grote Prijs Jef Scherens =

Race details
- Dates: 7 September 2003
- Stages: 1
- Distance: 183 km (113.7 mi)
- Winning time: 4h 06' 00"

Results
	Winner	Thor Hushovd (NOR)
	Second	Roger Hammond (GBR)
	Third	Niko Eeckhout (BEL)

The 2003 Grote Prijs Jef Scherens was the 37th edition of the Grote Prijs Jef Scherens cycle race and was held on 7 September 2003. The race started and finished in Leuven. The race was won by Thor Hushovd.

== General classification ==
Final general classification

Rank	Rider	Time
1	Thor Hushovd (NOR)	4h 06' 00"
2	Roger Hammond (GBR)	+ 0"
3	Niko Eeckhout (BEL)	+ 0"
4	Ludovic Capelle (BEL)	+ 0"
5	Michael Skelde (DEN)	+ 0"
6	Frank Høj (DEN)	+ 0"
7	Mark Renshaw (AUS)	+ 0"
8	Jimmy Casper (FRA)	+ 0"
9	Aurélien Clerc (SUI)	+ 0"
10	Jan Kuyckx (BEL)	+ 0"
