= Nicolas Cleppe =

Belgian cyclo-cross cyclist

Personal information
- Full name: Nicolas Cleppe
- Born: 12 December 1995 (age 30) Tielt, Belgium
- Height: 1.84 m (6 ft 0 in)
- Weight: 66 kg (146 lb)

Cycling career
- Sport: Cycling
- Current team: Baloise Verzekeringen–Het Poetsbureau Lions
- Disciplines: Cyclo-cross; Road
- Role: Rider

Professional team
- 2014–2020: Telenet–Fidea

Nicolas Cleppe (born 12 December 1995 in Tielt) is a Belgian former cyclo-cross and road cyclist, who rode for UCI Continental team Baloise Verzekeringen–Het Poetsbureau Lions.

Cleppe retired the end of 2020, after his contract was not renewed by Telenet–Baloise Lions.

== Major results ==
=== Cyclo-cross ===
2015-2016
Under-23 Superprestige

1st Spa-Francorchamps

2016–2017
2nd National Under-23 Championships
2017–2018
EKZ CrossTour

3rd Baden

2018–2019
1st Jingle Cross Race 2
EKZ CrossTour

3rd Hittnau

3rd Radcross Grandprix

=== Road ===
2018
1st Mountains classification, Tour de Wallonie
2nd Overall Tour de Liège
2019
1st Overall Tour de Liège

1st Stage 5

6th Internationale Wielertrofee Jong Maar Moedig
