= Collstrop (cycling team) =

Cycling team

Team information
- Registered: Belgium
- Founded: 1986
- Disbanded: 2000
- Discipline: Road
- Status: Pro team (1986–1998); Trade Team II (1999–2000)

Key personnel
- Team managers: Luc Landuyt; Roger De Vlaeminck; Willy Teirlink

Team name history
- 1986 1987 1988 1989 1990 1991 1992 1993 1994 1995–1996 1997 1998 1999–2000: Robland–La Claire Fontaine; Robland–Isoglass; Isoglass–EVS–Robland; Mini–Flat–Isoglass; Isoglass–Garden Wood; Collstrop–Isoglass; Collstrop–Garden Wood; Collstrop–Assur Carpets; Collstrop–Willy Naessens; Collstrop–Lystex; Collstrop–Zeno Project; Collstrop; Collstrop–De Federale Verzekeringen
Collstrop jersey
Jersey

Collstrop was a Belgian professional road cycling team that existed from 1986 until 2008, when it merged with Palmans–Ideal.

== Team Sponsors ==
The team had new co-sponsors nearly every year from 1986.

The 1990 Team Isoglass - Garden Wood - Tönissteiner was supplied by Rossin Bikes.

== Final Roster (2000) ==
As of 1 January 2000

Rider	Date of birth
Dirk Aernouts (BEL)	14 September 1975 (aged 24)
Danny Baeyens (BEL)	17 January 1974 (aged 25)
Martin Bo Johansson (SWE)	19 November 1969 (aged 30)
Tony Bracke (BEL)	15 December 1971 (aged 28)
Andy Cappelle (BEL)	30 April 1979 (aged 20)
Eric De Clercq (BEL)	3 December 1967 (aged 32)
Hans de Meester (BEL)	7 August 1970 (aged 29)
Koen Deschuytter (BEL)	18 September 1971 (aged 28)
Roger Hammond (GBR)	30 January 1974 (aged 25)
Lorenzo Lapage (BEL)	14 April 1966 (aged 33)

Rider	Date of birth
Geert Omloop (BEL)	12 February 1974 (aged 25)
Oleg Pankov (UKR)	2 August 1967 (aged 32)
Frederik Penne (BEL)	5 June 1978 (aged 21)
Hans Redant (BEL)	6 April 1970 (aged 29)
Bert Scheirlinckx (BEL)	1 November 1974 (aged 25)
Staf Scheirlinckx (BEL)	12 March 1979 (aged 20)
Marc Streel (BEL)	12 August 1971 (aged 28)
Danny Van Cappellen (BEL)	7 October 1977 (aged 22)
Johan Van Der Berg (RSA)	31 January 1976 (aged 23)
Donatas Virbickas (LTU)	24 May 1974 (aged 25)

== Major victories ==
- Omloop van het Houtland: Hendrik Redant (1987), Etienne De Wilde (1994)
- Kuurne–Brussels–Kuurne: Hendrik Redant (1988)
- Cholet-Pays de Loire: Laurent Desbiens (1992), Marc Bouillon (1993)
- Volta Limburg Classic: Erwin Thijs (1994), John van den Akker (1994)
- Grand Prix Guillaume Tell: Peter Verbeken (1993, 1995)
- Grand Prix de Denain: Jo Planckaert (1995)
- Nokere Koerse: Jo Planckaert (1995)
- Clásica de Almería: Jean-Pierre Heynderickx (1995)
- Stage 7 Vuelta a España: Benny Van Brabant (1990)

== UCI Rankings ==
Season	Team rank	Top ranked rider
1995	24	(Belgium) Jo Planckaert (125)
1996	22	(Belgium) Johan Capiot (48)
1997	49	(Denmark) Frank Hoj (204)
1998	49	(Belgium) Tom Desmet (331)
1999	28 (GSII)	(Belgium) Tony Bracke (382)
2000	26 (GSII)	(Belgium) Geert Omloop (349)
