= Kevin Deltombe =

Belgian cyclist

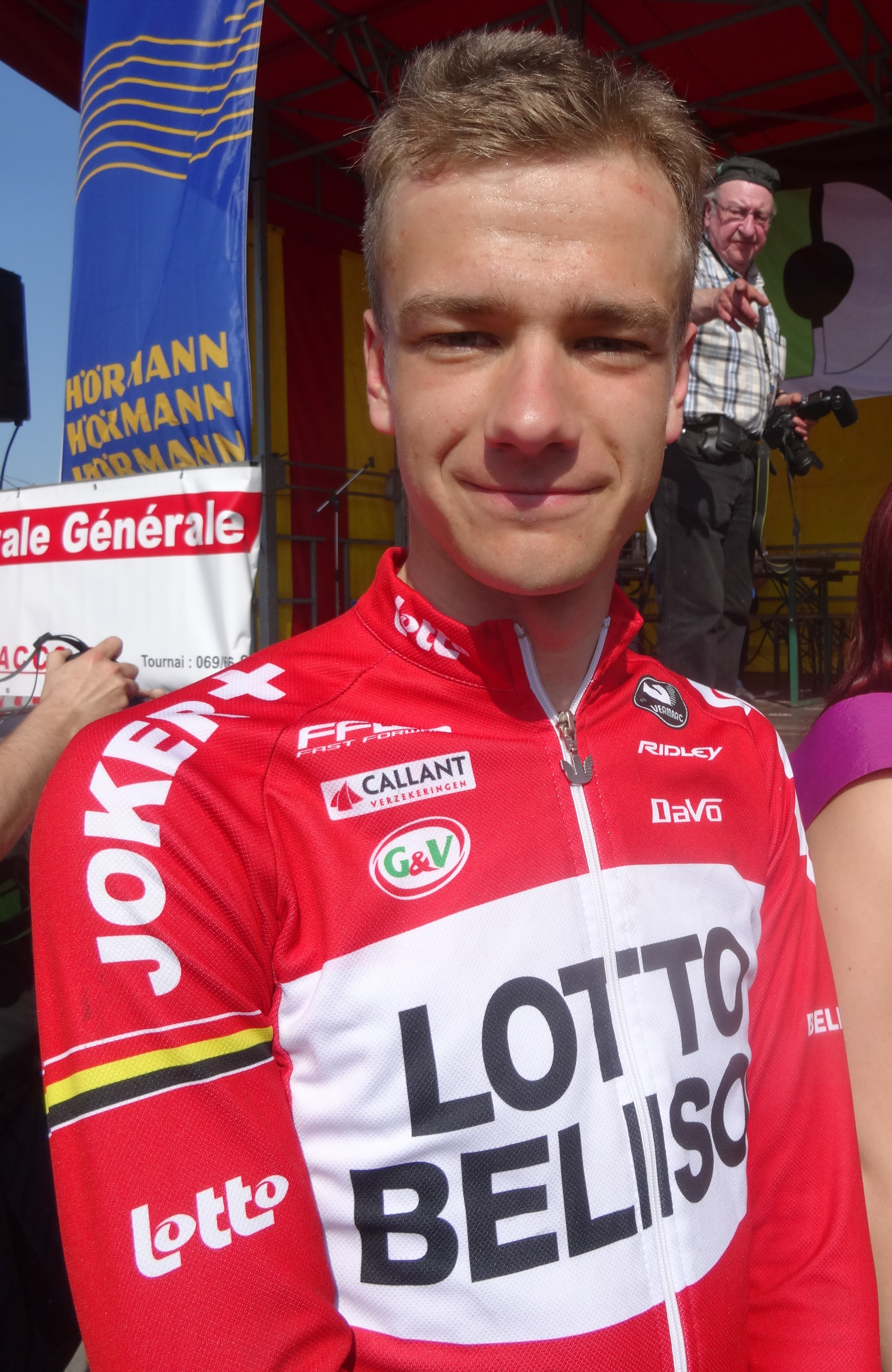
- Deltombe in 2014.

Personal information
- Full name: Kevin Deltombe
- Born: 27 February 1994 (age 32) Bruges, Belgium
- Height: 1.78 m (5 ft 10 in)
- Weight: 66 kg (146 lb)

Cycling career
- Sport: Cycling
- Current team: Retired
- Discipline: Road
- Role: Rider

Amateur teams
- 2011: Immo Dejaegher–Lotto Menen
- 2012: Avia Fuji Youth
- 2013–2016: Lotto–Belisol U23

Professional teams
- 2016: Lotto–Soudal (stagiaire)
- 2017–2020: Sport Vlaanderen–Baloise

Kevin Deltombe (born 27 February 1994) is a Belgian former cyclist, who competed professionally for UCI ProTeam Sport Vlaanderen–Baloise from 2017 to 2020.

== Major results ==
2011
1st Stage 1 Tour du Valromey
2012
1st Stage 1 Trofeo Karlsberg
1st Stage 1 Oberösterreich Juniorenrundfahrt
2014
3rd Grand Prix Criquielion
2016
4th Paris–Tours Espoirs
9th Dwars door de Vlaamse Ardennen
9th Grand Prix de la Ville de Lillers Souvenir Bruno Comini
2018
5th Grand Prix of Aargau Canton
7th GP Stad Zottegem
2019
8th Volta Limburg Classic
