= 1998 Grote Prijs Jef Scherens =

Race details
- Dates: 6 September 1998
- Stages: 1
- Distance: 191 km (118.7 mi)
- Winning time: 4h 12' 25"

Results
	Winner	Jo Planckaert (BEL)
	Second	Johan Verstrepen (BEL)
	Third	Raymond Meijs (NED)

The 1998 Grote Prijs Jef Scherens was the 32nd edition of the Grote Prijs Jef Scherens cycle race and was held on 6 September 1998. The race started and finished in Leuven. The race was won by Jo Planckaert.

== General classification ==
Final general classification

Rank	Rider	Time
1	Jo Planckaert (BEL)	4h 12' 25"
2	Johan Verstrepen (BEL)	+ 0"
3	Raymond Meijs (NED)	+ 0"
4	Ludovic Capelle (BEL)	+ 19"
5	Danny Nelissen (NED)	+ 19"
6	Andy De Smet (BEL)	+ 19"
7	Gilles Talmant (FRA)	+ 19"
8	Davy Delme (BEL)	+ 19"
9	Sébastien Demarbaix (BEL)	+ 19"
10	Claude Lamour (FRA)	+ 19"
