= Ronald Mutsaars =

Dutch former cyclist (born 1979)

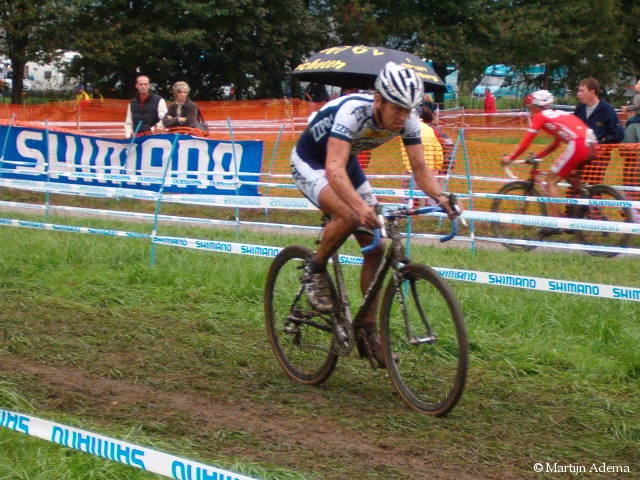
- Ronald Mutsaars in 2006.

Personal information
- Born: 19 April 1979 (age 47) Schijndel, Netherlands
- Height: 1.76 m (5 ft 9 in)
- Weight: 67 kg (148 lb)

Cycling career
- Sport: Cycling
- Current team: Retired
- Disciplines: Road; Cyclo-cross
- Role: Rider

Amateur teams
- 1998–2001: Rabobank Beloften
- 2006: ZZPR.nl

Professional team
- 2002–2005: Rabobank

Ronald Mutsaars (born 19 April 1979 in Schijndel) is a Dutch former cyclist, who competed as a professional from 2002 to 2005 with Rabobank. He rode in the 2003 and 2004 Vuelta a España, as well as the 2005 Paris–Roubaix. His brother Guido and father Henk were also professional cyclists.

== Major results ==
1998
2nd PWZ Zuidenveld Tour
1999
2nd Kattekoers
10th Hel van het Mergelland
2000
3rd Paris–Tours Espoirs
9th Overall GP Tell
2001
3rd Overall Thüringen Rundfahrt
7th Overall Le Triptyque des Monts et Châteaux

1st Stage 3

2002
8th Veenendaal–Veenendaal
2003
6th Ronde van Drenthe
10th Trofeo Luis Puig
2004
2nd Overall Tour du Poitou Charentes
10th Grand Prix S.A.T.S.
2005
2nd Trofeo Manacor
