= 2000 Hel van het Mergelland =

Race details
- Dates: 8 April 2000
- Stages: 1
- Distance: 181 km (112.5 mi)
- Winning time: 4h 27' 32"

Results
	Winner	Bert Grabsch (GER)
	Second	Dirk Müller (GER)
	Third	David Moncoutié (FRA)

The 2000 Hel van het Mergelland was the 28th edition of the Volta Limburg Classic cycle race and was held on 8 April 2000. The race started and finished in Eijsden. The race was won by Bert Grabsch.

== General classification ==
Final general classification

Rank	Rider	Time
1	Bert Grabsch (GER)	4h 27' 32"
2	Dirk Müller (GER)	+ 2"
3	David Moncoutié (FRA)	+ 6"
4	Claude Lamour (FRA)	+ 50"
5	Wim Van de Meulenhof (NED)	+ 52"
6	Stephan Gottschling (GER)	+ 54"
7	Marcus Ljungqvist (SWE)	+ 1' 01"
8	Piotr Wadecki (POL)	+ 1' 01"
9	Gerben Löwik (NED)	+ 1' 01"
10	Alexandre Usov (BLR)	+ 1' 01"
