= Mikhaylo Khalilov =

Ukrainian cyclist

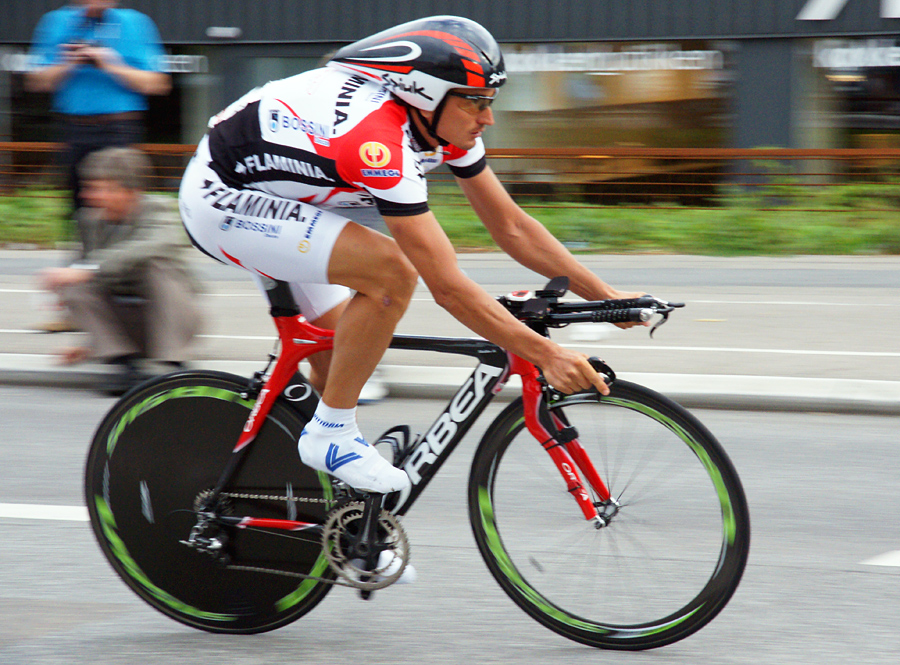

Personal information
- Full name: Mikhaylo Khalilov; Михайло Халілов
- Born: 3 July 1975 (age 51) Mykolaiv, Ukrainian SSR, Soviet Union

Cycling career
- Sport: Cycling
- Discipline: Road
- Role: Rider

Amateur team
- 2000: Aguardiente Néctar–Selle Italia (stagiaire)

Professional teams
- 2001–2003: Selle Italia–Pacific
- 2004: Team ICET
- 2005–2006: LPR–Piacenza
- 2007–2009: Ceramica Flaminia–Bossini Docce
- 2010: Team Katusha

Mikhaylo Khalilov (Ukrainian: Михайло Михайлович Халілов; born 3 July 1975 in Mykolaiv) is a Ukrainian former professional road racing cyclist. He competed in the men's individual road race at the 1996 Summer Olympics.

== Major results ==
1995
3rd Overall Circuit Franco-Belge

1st Stages 3 & 7

3rd Circuit de Wallonie
1996
2nd Road race, National Road Championships
2000
1st Overall Tour du Faso

1st Points classification
1st Stage 2, 3, 8, 10 & 11

2001
8th Milano–Torino
9th Stausee-Rundfahrt Klingnau
2002
1st Stage 6 Tour of Bulgaria
2nd Tour du Lac Léman
2nd Trofeo dell'Etna
2003
1st Stages 1 & 4 Tour du Sénégal
3rd Stausee-Rundfahrt Klingnau
4th Giro del Lago Maggiore
9th Trofeo dell'Etna
2004
2nd Giro del Lago Maggiore
4th Giro del Friuli
6th Giro delle Colline del Chianti
9th A Travers le Morbihan
2005
1st Road race, National Road Championships
1st Stage 5 Vuelta a Asturias
2nd Giro di Toscana
3rd Overall Tour de Picardie
3rd Coppa Placci
6th Paris–Camembert
9th Route Adélie
2006
1st Military World Road Race Championships
1st Hel van het Mergelland
6th Overall Tour of Belgium
8th Gran Premio Bruno Beghelli
2007
3rd Road race, National Road Championships
3rd GP Industria & Artigianato di Larciano
3rd Monte Paschi Eroica
3rd Coppa Sabatini
4th Gran Premio Bruno Beghelli
5th Milano–Torino
5th GP Industria & Commercio di Prato
9th Giro del Veneto
2008
1st Grand Prix de Rennes
1st Memorial Cimurri
1st Coppa Sabatini
1st GP Industria & Commercio di Prato
2nd Gran Premio Bruno Beghelli
5th Giro di Toscana
5th Overall Volta ao Distrito de Santarém
7th Memorial Viviana Manservisi
10th Overall Circuit de la Sarthe

1st Stage 4

2009
4th Memorial Cimurri
2010
8th Overall Four Days of Dunkirk
9th Overall Tour de Picardie
