= Groningen–Münster =

Race details
- Region: Germany and the Netherlands
- Discipline: Road
- Type: One-day race

History
- First edition: 2000
- Editions: 5
- Final edition: 2004
- First winner: Aart Vierhouten (NED)
- Most wins: Robert Förster (GER) (2 wins)
- Final winner: Robert Förster (GER)

Groningen–Münster was a single-day road cycling race held from 2000 to 2004, which was contested between the cities of Groningen, the Netherlands, and Münster, Germany.

== Winners ==
Year	Winner	Second	Third
2000	(Netherlands) Aart Vierhouten	(Netherlands) Raymond Meijs	(Sweden) Marcus Ljungqvist
2001	(Netherlands) Tom Cordes	(Germany) Enrico Poitschke	(Czech Republic) Michal Precechtel
2002	(Germany) Olaf Pollack	(Germany) Steffen Radochla	(Australia) David McKenzie
2003	(Germany) Robert Förster	(Germany) Olaf Pollack	(Germany) Jonas Owczarek
2004	(Germany) Robert Förster	(Germany) Sebastian Siedler	(Germany) David Kopp
