= Peter Verbeken =

Belgian road cyclist

Personal information
- Born: 15 April 1966 (age 60) Deinze, Belgium

Cycling career
- Sport: Cycling
- Current team: Retired
- Discipline: Road
- Role: Rider

Professional teams
- 1989: Hitachi
- 1990–1995: Isoglass–Garden Wood
- 1996: Lotto
- 1997: Collstrop–Zeno Project
- 1998: Ipso–Euroclean

Peter Verbeken (born 15 April 1966) is a Belgian former professional road cyclist, who competed between 1989 and 1998. He had 17 wins in his career, and competed in three editions of the Vuelta a España.

== Major results ==
1990
6th Overall Vuelta a Aragón
1992
8th Circuit des Frontières
1993
1st Overall Grand Prix Guillaume Tell
1st La Côte Picarde
1994
1st Stage 4 Tour DuPont
1st Stage 6 Regio-Tour
3rd Road race, National Road Championships
1995
1st Overall Grand Prix Guillaume Tell

1st Stage 6

1996
3rd Kampioenschap van Vlaanderen
6th Route Adélie
10th Cholet-Pays de Loire
1997
1st Flèche Hesbignonne
3rd De Kustpijl
1998
1st Flèche Hesbignonne
