= Dirk Meier =

East German cyclist (born 1964)

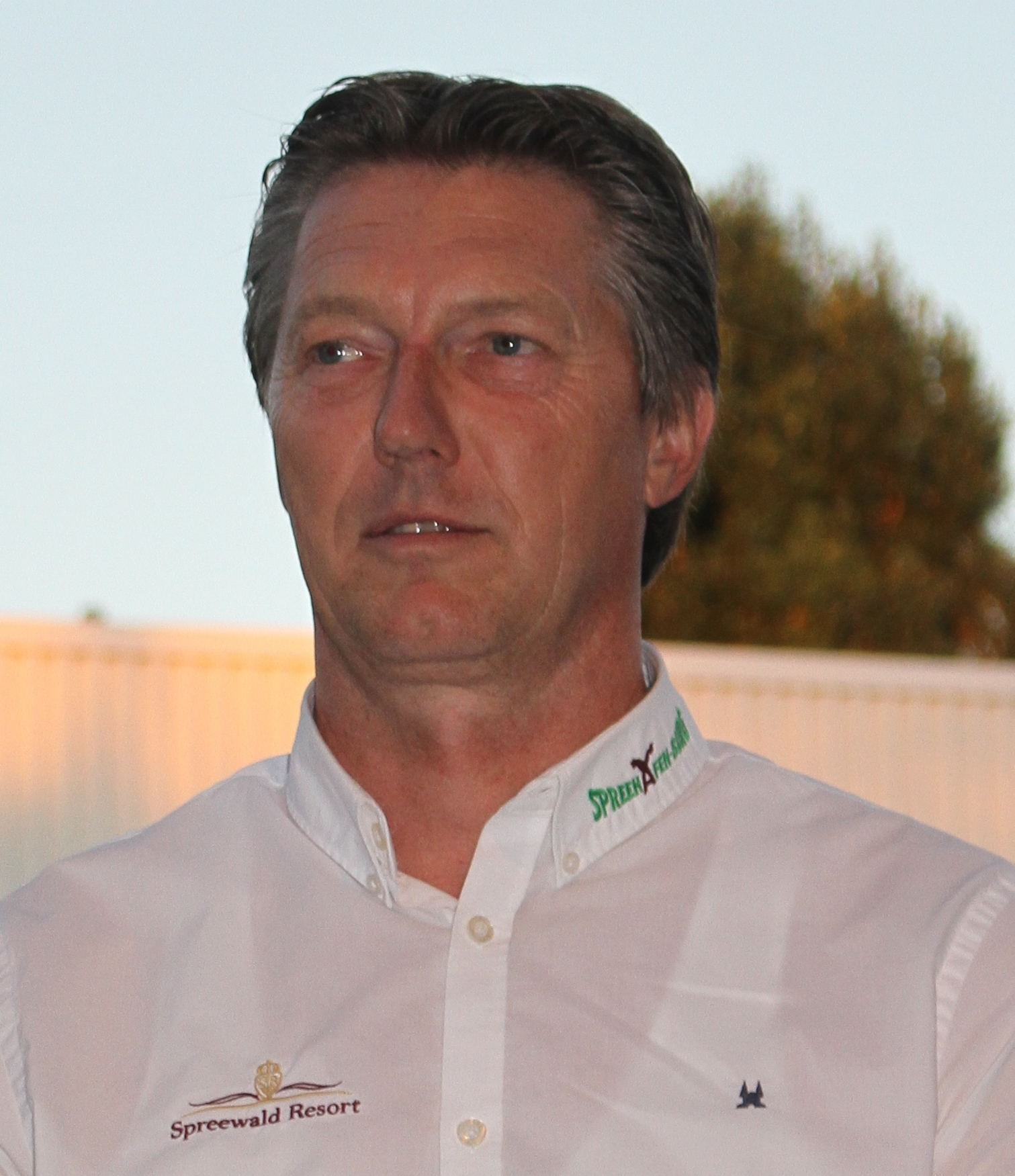
- Dirk Meier in 2016

Personal information
- Born: 28 January 1964 (age 62) Spremberg, Bezirk Cottbus, East Germany
- Height: 1.88 m (6 ft 2 in)
- Weight: 76 kg (168 lb)

Sport
- Sport: Cycling
- Club: SC Cottbus
Medal record
Representing East Germany
Olympic Games
Silver medal – second place	1988 Seoul	Team pursuit
World championships
Silver medal – second place	1986 Colorado Springs	Team pursuit
Silver medal – second place	1987 Vienna	Team pursuit

Dirk Meier (born 28 January 1964) is a retired East German cyclist. He had his best achievements in the 4000 m team pursuit, winning silver medals at the world championships of 1986 and 1987 and at the 1988 Summer Olympics.

As a road racer, he won the Tour de Liège in 1987 and 1989, as well as the Niedersachsen Rundfahrt and Olympia's Tour in 1988.
