= Corey Sweet =

Australian cyclist (born 1976)

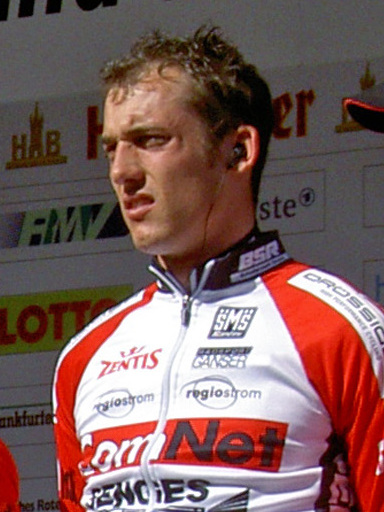
- Sweet in 2005

Personal information
- Born: 25 November 1976 (age 49) Adelaide, Australia

Cycling career
- Sport: Cycling
- Current team: Retired
- Discipline: Road
- Role: Rider

Professional teams
- 1999: Leonardo Coast
- 2000: Team Hohenfelder–Concorde
- 2001–2002: BankGiroLoterij
- 2003: Crédit Agricole
- 2004–2005: ComNet–Senges
- 2006: Wiesenhof–AKUD
- 2007: Regiostrom–Senges

Corey Sweet (born 25 November 1976) is an Australian former racing cyclist, who competed as a professional from 1999 to 2007.

== Major results ==
1997
1st Overall Tour of Wellington
1999
7th Overall Herald Sun Tour
2000
4th Overall Ringerike GP
2001
6th Overall Tour de Luxembourg
2002
1st Hel van het Mergelland
1st Stage 3 Tour de Luxembourg
2004
3rd Overall Tour of Queensland

1st Stage 6

3rd Sparkassen Giro Bochum
4th Overall Niedersachsen-Rundfahrt

1st Mountains classification

5th Omloop der Kempen
6th Rund um den Flughafen Köln-Bonn
6th GP Aarhus
8th Rund um die Hainleite
10th Rund um Düren
10th Rund um Köln
2005
6th Overall Bayern–Rundfahrt
7th Rund um Düren
10th Overall Niedersachsen-Rundfahrt
2007
4th Overall Circuit des Ardennes
4th Overall Rheinland-Pfalz Rundfahrt
