= ZLM Tour (UCI ProSeries) =

Dutch multi-day road cycling race

Race details
- Date: June
- Region: Netherlands, Belgium
- English name: ZLM Tour
- Discipline: Road
- Competition: UCI Europe Tour; UCI ProSeries (2020–2024)
- Type: Stage race
- Web site: zlmtour.nl

History
- First edition: 1987
- Editions: 36 (as of 2026)
- First winner: Theo Gevers (NED)
- Most wins: Philippe Gilbert (BEL) (3 wins)
- Most recent: Mathias Vacek (CZE)

The ZLM Tour is a cycling race held over five stages, held in the southern Netherlands and Belgium as category 2.1 event on the UCI Europe Tour. From 2020 to 2024, it was on the UCI ProSeries calendar. The race started in 1987 as an amateur race, and became a race for professional cyclists in 1996.

== Name of the race ==
- 1987–1989 : Rondom Schijndel
- 1990–1997 : Teleflex Tour
- 1998–2000 : Ster der Beloften
- 2001–2010 : Ster Elekrotoer
- 2011–2017 : Ster ZLM Toer - GP Jan van Heeswijk
- 2019–present: ZLM Tour

== Winners ==
Year	Country	Rider	Team
1987	Netherlands	Theo Gevers	
1988	Netherlands	Arno Ottevanger	
1989	Netherlands	Reem Kok	
1990	Netherlands	John Den Braber	
1991	Netherlands	Tristan Hoffman	
1992	Netherlands	Martin Van Steen	
1993	Netherlands	Servais Knaven	
1994	Netherlands	Jos Wolfkamp	
1995	Netherlands	Bennie Gosink	
1996	United States	Tyler Hamilton	U.S. Postal Service
1997	Netherlands	Eddy Bouwmans	Foreldorado–Golff
1998	Netherlands	Karsten Kroon	Rabobank Beloften
1999	Germany	Ralf Grabsch	Team Cologne
2000	Belgium	Andy De Smet	Spar–OKI
2001	France	Xavier Jan	BigMat–Auber 93
2002	Netherlands	Bart Voskamp	BankGiroLoterij–Batavus
2003	Netherlands	Gerben Löwik	BankGiroLoterij–Batavus
2004	Belgium	Nick Nuyens	Quick-Step–Davitamon
2005	Germany	Stefan Schumacher	Shimano–Memory Corp
2006	Norway	Kurt Asle Arvesen	Team CSC
2007	Netherlands	Sebastian Langeveld	Rabobank
2008	Italy	Enrico Gasparotto	Barloworld
2009	Belgium	Philippe Gilbert	Silence–Lotto
2010	Australia	Adam Hansen	Team HTC–Columbia
2011	Belgium	Philippe Gilbert	Omega Pharma–Lotto
2012	Great Britain	Mark Cavendish	Team Sky
2013	Netherlands	Lars Boom	Blanco Pro Cycling
2014	Belgium	Philippe Gilbert	BMC Racing Team
2015	Germany	André Greipel	Lotto–Soudal
2016	Belgium	Sep Vanmarcke	LottoNL–Jumbo
2017	Portugal	José Gonçalves	Team Katusha–Alpecin
2018	No race due to several stage finish host locations cancelling their interest		
2019	Netherlands	Mike Teunissen	Team Jumbo–Visma
2020– 2021	No race due to the COVID-19 pandemic in the Netherlands		
2022	Netherlands	Olav Kooij	Team Jumbo–Visma
2023	Netherlands	Olav Kooij	Team Jumbo–Visma
2024	Belgium	Rune Herregodts	Intermarché–Wanty
2025	No race		
2026	Czech Republic	Mathias Vacek	Lidl–Trek

=== Wins per country ===
Wins	Country
18	Netherlands
7	Belgium
3	Germany
1	Australia; France; Great Britain; Italy; Norway; Portugal; United States; Czech Republic
