= Thierry De Groote =

Belgian cyclist

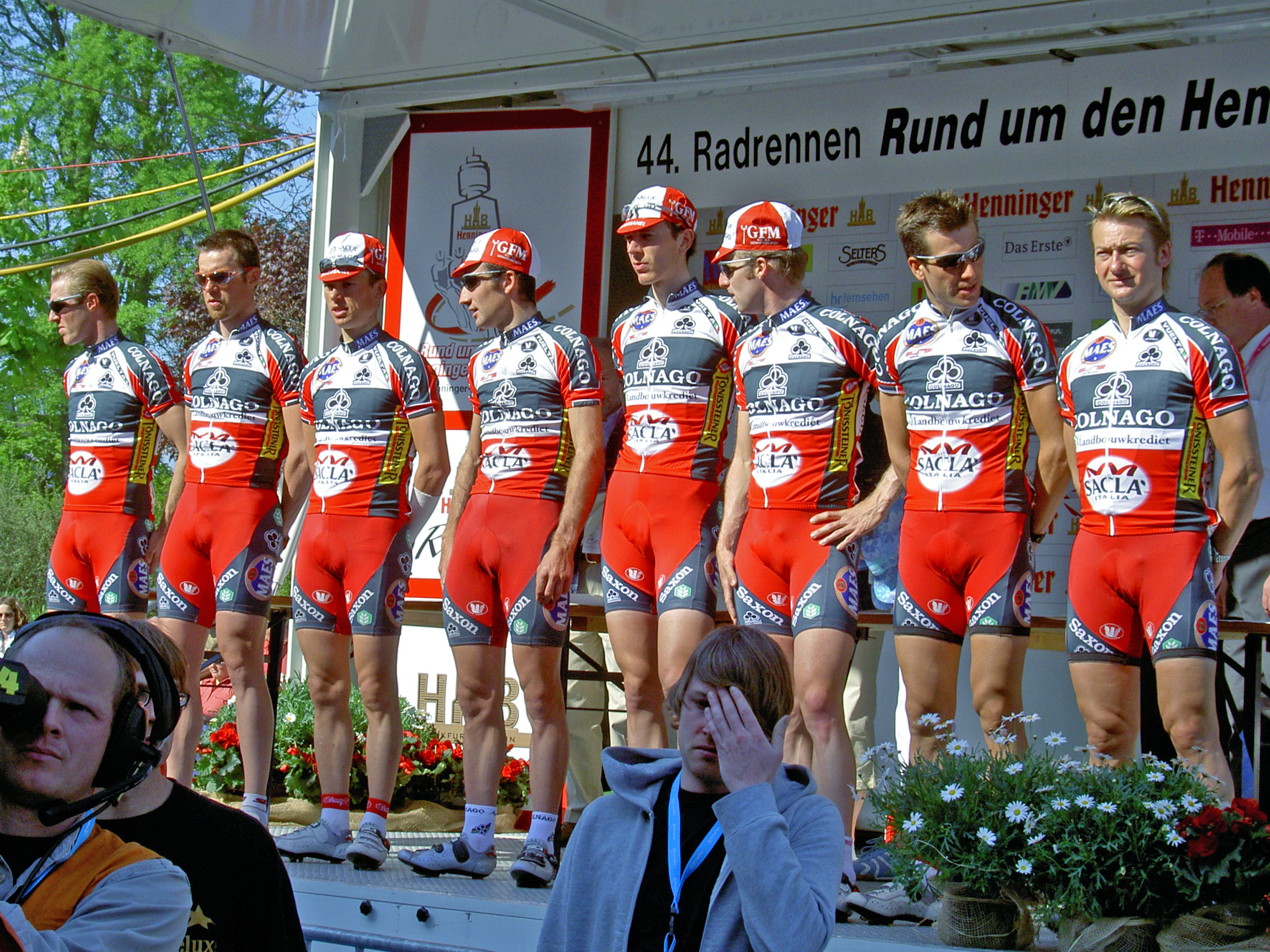

Thierry De Groote (born 9 May 1975 in Deinze, Belgium) is a professional road bicycle racer.

He started his professional career in 2001 at the Belgian team Palmans-Colstrop.

De Groote lives in Nazareth, Belgium.

== Palmarès ==
1993
1st, Eindklassement Ster van Zuid-Limburg, Juniores
2nd, Trofee van Vlaanderen Reningelst, Juniores
1996
3rd, 2e etappe Ronde van Limburg, Herderen-Riemst
2000
2nd, Hasselt - Spa - Hasselt
1st, Zesbergen prijs Harelbeke
2nd, 6e etappe tour de liège.
2nd, Eindklassement Pour de kliège
2002
2nd Hel van het Mergelland
2nd, Mere
2nd, Zwevegem
2003
2nd, 1e etappe Tour de la region De Wallonne
2nd, Vichte
2007
1st, 1e etappe Triptyque Ardennais, Sprimont

== Teams ==
2001-2003 = Palmans-Colstrop
2005 = landbouwkrediet-colnago
2006 = Jartazi
2007 = yawadoo - Colba - ABM
