= Erwin Thijs =

Belgian cyclist

Personal information
- Full name: Erwin Thijs
- Born: 6 August 1970 (age 56) Tongeren, Belgium

Cycling career
- Sport: Cycling
- Discipline: Road
- Role: Rider

Amateur team
- 1992: Collstrop-Histor (trainee)

Professional teams
- 1993–1994: Collstrop
- 1995–1998, 2000: Vlaanderen 2002-Eddy Merckx
- 1999: Cologne
- 2001: Lotto-Adecco
- 2002–2003: Palmans-Collstrop
- 2004–2005: MrBookmaker.com
- 2006–2007: Unibet.com

Erwin Thijs (born 6 August 1970 in Tongeren) is a former Belgian professional road bicycle racer. He competed in the individual road race at the 1992 Summer Olympics.

== Palmarès ==
1987
2nd, National U17 Road Race Championship
1992
1st, Overall, Circuit Franco-Belge
1993
1st, Hel van het Mergelland
1994
1st, Stage, Circuit de la Sarthe
1996
1st, Brussels-Ingooigem
1997
1st, Stage 2, Circuito Montañés
1998
1st, Flèche Ardennaise
1st, kermesse in Dilsen
7th, Grand Prix des Nations
1999
1st, kermesses in Jülich & Dortmund
2000
1st, Ronde van Limburg
1st, Points Competition, Ster der Beloften

Winner Stages 2 & 3

1st, Stage 3, Dekra Open
2001
1st, kermesses in Stekene, Strombeek-Bever & Wingene
2002
1st, Stadsprijs Geraardsbergen
1st, Stage 4, Tour de Wallonie
2003
1st, Flèche Hesbignonne
2004
1st Grote Prijs Beeckman-De Caluwé
2005
1st, Stage 4, Ster Elektrotoer
13th, Paris–Roubaix
2006
1st, Colliers Classic
1st, Flèche Hesbignonne
1st, Stage 6, Peace Race
