= Raymond Vanstraelen =

- Born: 7 March 1947 (age 79); Schakkebroek, Belgium
- Occupations: Entrepreneur (active since 1986); Former Cyclist
- Known for: Founder of bioracer

Raymond Vanstraelen (born 7 March 1947) is a Belgian entrepreneur and former cyclist. He is the founder of the sports apparel company bioracer, known for incorporating biomechanical measurement and analysis into high-performance cycling clothing.

== Biography ==
Vanstraelen began his career as an amateur cyclist, competing for nine years and winning 72 races, including the Championship of Limburg in 1967, Köln Schulz in 1970, and the Vuelta Ampurdan in 1973. He received offers to turn professional but declined due to financial uncertainty, choosing instead to work for the former Belgian telecommunications company Proximus (then R.T.T.).

After obtaining his "Trainer A" qualification, he became a cycling coach at Bloso (now Sport Vlaanderen) in 1976, where he introduced ergonomic measurement techniques to improve rider performance. He founded Belgium's first dedicated cycling school, coaching riders such as Eric Vanderaerden, Guy Nulens, Johan Capiot and René Martens.

In 1986 Vanstraelen co-founded bioracer together with sports physician Yvan Van Mol, initially developing a biomechanical bike-fitting system. In 1988 he and his wife began producing cycling jerseys and rain jackets in Nieuwerkerken, inspired by ski clothing. Their first major customer was the professional cycling team Panasonic.

Bioracer became one of the first companies to adopt precision mannequins, later moving toward 3D body scanning and aerodynamic testing in wind tunnels to develop customized performance clothing. Vanstraelen emphasized innovation in technology, aerodynamics and human biomechanics.

Under his leadership, Bioracer expanded from a local company in Tessenderlo into a major European supplier of cycling apparel for professional teams and national federations, including INEOS Grenadiers, TotalEnergies and Belgian Cycling. The company also supplied national teams from Belgium, the Netherlands and Germany, and was represented at several Olympic Games.

Bioracer later expanded its aerodynamic innovations into suits for time-trial and track cycling, and eventually developed suits for Speed skating. The company also introduced a platform integrating aerodynamic and biomechanical data to optimize rider posture and equipment.

By 2022 Bioracer operated across multiple continents and produced around 15,000 new designs annually, while shifting production to Romania, North Macedonia, Tunisia and Colombia.

A failed leadership transition in 2000 almost bankrupted the company, but it was rescued by investment from the Limburg Reconversion Company (LRM), which became a co-shareholder. In 2017 Vanstraelen was succeeded as CEO by Danny Segers.

== Awards ==
Bioracer won the Limburg innovation award in 2012 for its one-piece Speedwear suit.

In 2019 the company received the Ambiorix Award, a regional business prize recognizing innovation and internationalization.

In 2024 Vanstraelen was nominated for the Flemish Sports Jewel for his contributions to elite sports development.
