= John van den Akker =

Dutch cyclist

Personal information
- Born: 30 May 1966 (age 60) Veldhoven, Netherlands

Cycling career
- Sport: Cycling
- Discipline: Road
- Role: Rider

Professional teams
- 1988: Roland
- 1989–1992: PDM–Ultima–Concorde
- 1993: ZG Mobili
- 1994: Collstrop–Willy Naessens
- 1995: Gouden Leeuw–Swallow
- 1996–1997: Foreldorado–Golff

John van den Akker (born 30 May 1966, in Veldhoven) is a Dutch former cyclist, who was professional from 1988 to 1997.

== Career achievements ==
=== Major results ===
1986
1st Ronde van Midden-Nederland
1987
1st Stage 3 Olympia's Tour
1988
7th Brussels–Ingooigem
1989
3rd Scheldeprijs
5th Grand Prix de la Libération (TTT)
7th Circuit des Frontières
1990
1st Stage 5 Vuelta a Murcia
1st Stage 5 Étoile de Bessèges
3rd Paris–Camembert
10th Overall Tour of Sweden
1991
3rd GP Rik Van Steenbergen
1992
2nd Overall Tour de Luxembourg
7th Grand Prix d'Isbergues
9th Overall Étoile de Bessèges
1994
9th Grand Prix d'Isbergues
1995
8th Binche–Tournai–Binche
1997
2nd Overall Olympia's Tour

1st Stage 4

9th Overall Tour of Sweden
1998
1st Stage 6 Olympia's Tour
4th Hel van het Mergelland

=== Grand Tour general classification results timeline ===
Grand Tour	1990	1991	1992	1993
Giro d'Italia	—	—	—	—
Tour de France	—	—	—	80
Vuelta a España	110	91	—	—

Legend
DSQ	Disqualified
DNF	Did not finish
