= Raymond Meijs =

Dutch cyclist

Personal information
- Born: 13 March 1968 (age 58) Valkenburg aan de Geul, Netherlands

Cycling career
- Sport: Cycling
- Current team: Retired
- Discipline: Road
- Role: Rider

Amateur teams
- 1990: TVM (stagiaire)
- 1991: Tulip Computers (stagiaire)
- 2003–2004: Fuji Bikes

Professional teams
- 1992: Tulip Computers
- 1993: La William–Duvel
- 1994: Trident–Schick
- 1995: Asfra–Orlans
- 1996–1997: Foreldorado–Golff
- 1998–2001: Team Gerolsteiner

Raymond Meijs (born 13 March 1968) is a Dutch former road cyclist, who competed as a professional from 1992 to 2001. He notably won the Hel van het Mergelland a record four times in his career, as well as the UCI Junior World Road Race Championships in 1985.

== Major results ==
1985
1st Road race, UCI Junior Road World Championships
1st Road race, National Junior Road Championships
1986
2nd Road race, National Junior Road Championships
1988
1st Drielandenomloop
3rd Ronde van Overijssel
4th Overall Circuit Franco-Belge
1989
2nd Overall Tour de Liège

1st Stage 1

2nd Drielandenomloop
1990
1st Hel van het Mergelland
1st Stage 2 Étoile du Brabant
2nd Grand Prix de Waregem
3rd Overall Tour de Liège

1st Stage 2

1991
1st Overall Tour de Liège

1st Stage 2a

1st Stage 7 Niedersachsen Rundfahrt
3rd Road race, National Amateur Road Championships
10th Grand Prix d'Isbergues
1993
2nd Grand Prix de Wallonie
4th Grote Prijs Jef Scherens
1994
7th Grand Prix d'Isbergues
10th Grand Prix Cerami
1995
3rd Grote Prijs Stad Zottegem
4th Nokere Koerse
9th Tour de Berne
1996
3rd Hel van het Mergelland
1997
1st Hel van het Mergelland
5th Druivenkoers-Overijse
1998
1st Hel van het Mergelland
3rd Schaal Sels
3rd Grote Prijs Jef Scherens
1999
1st Hel van het Mergelland
2nd Rund um Köln
2nd Rund um den Flughafen Köln-Bonn
3rd Road race, National Road Championships
2000
2nd Groningen–Münster
4th Road race, National Road Championships
10th Sparkassen Giro Bochum
2001
2nd Dwars door Gendringen
