= Ralf Grabsch =

German cyclist

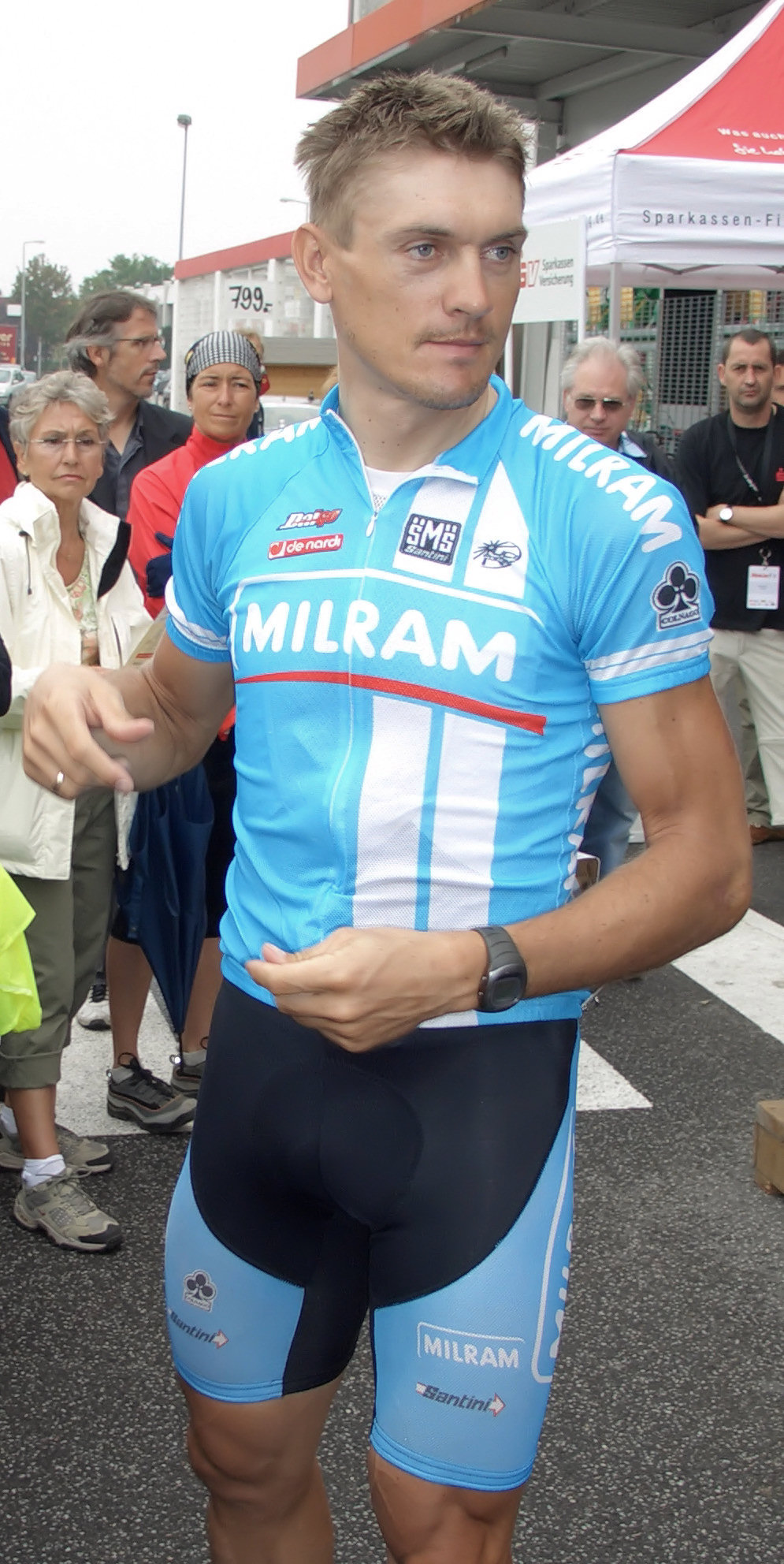
- Grabsch in 2006

Personal information
- Full name: Ralf Grabsch
- Born: 7 April 1973 (age 53) Wittenberg, Germany

Cycling career
- Sport: Cycling
- Current team: Rad-Net Oßwald
- Discipline: Road
- Role: Rider (retired); Directeur sportif

Professional teams
- 1996–1997: PSV Köln
- 1998: Gerolsteiner
- 1999: Team Cologne
- 2000–2002: Team Telekom
- 2003–2005: Team Wiesenhof
- 2006–2008: Team Milram

Ralf Grabsch (born 7 April 1973) is a German former road racing cyclist, who currently works as a directeur sportif for UCI Continental team Rad-Net Oßwald. He was born in Wittenberg and is the older brother of fellow road racing cyclist Bert Grabsch.

== Major results ==
1994
2nd Overall Course de la Paix

1st Stage 9

1995
1st Stage 12 Commonwealth Bank Classic
1996
1st Hessen-Rundfahrt
1997
1st Köln-Schuld-Frechen
1st Stage 3b Bayern-Rundfahrt
1998
1st Osterrennen
1st Stage 3 Tour du Poitou-Charentes
2nd Overall Ster der Beloften
1999
1st Overall Ster der Beloften

1st Stage 3

2001
1st Criterium Altenkirchen
2003
2nd Overall Ytong Bohemia Tour
2004
1st City Night Rede
2006
1st Rund um den Magdeburger Dom
1st Stage 3 Bayern-Rundfahrt
1st Stage 1 Cologne Classic
2007
1st Rund um die Wittenberger Altstadt
