= Nico Sijmens =

Belgian cyclist

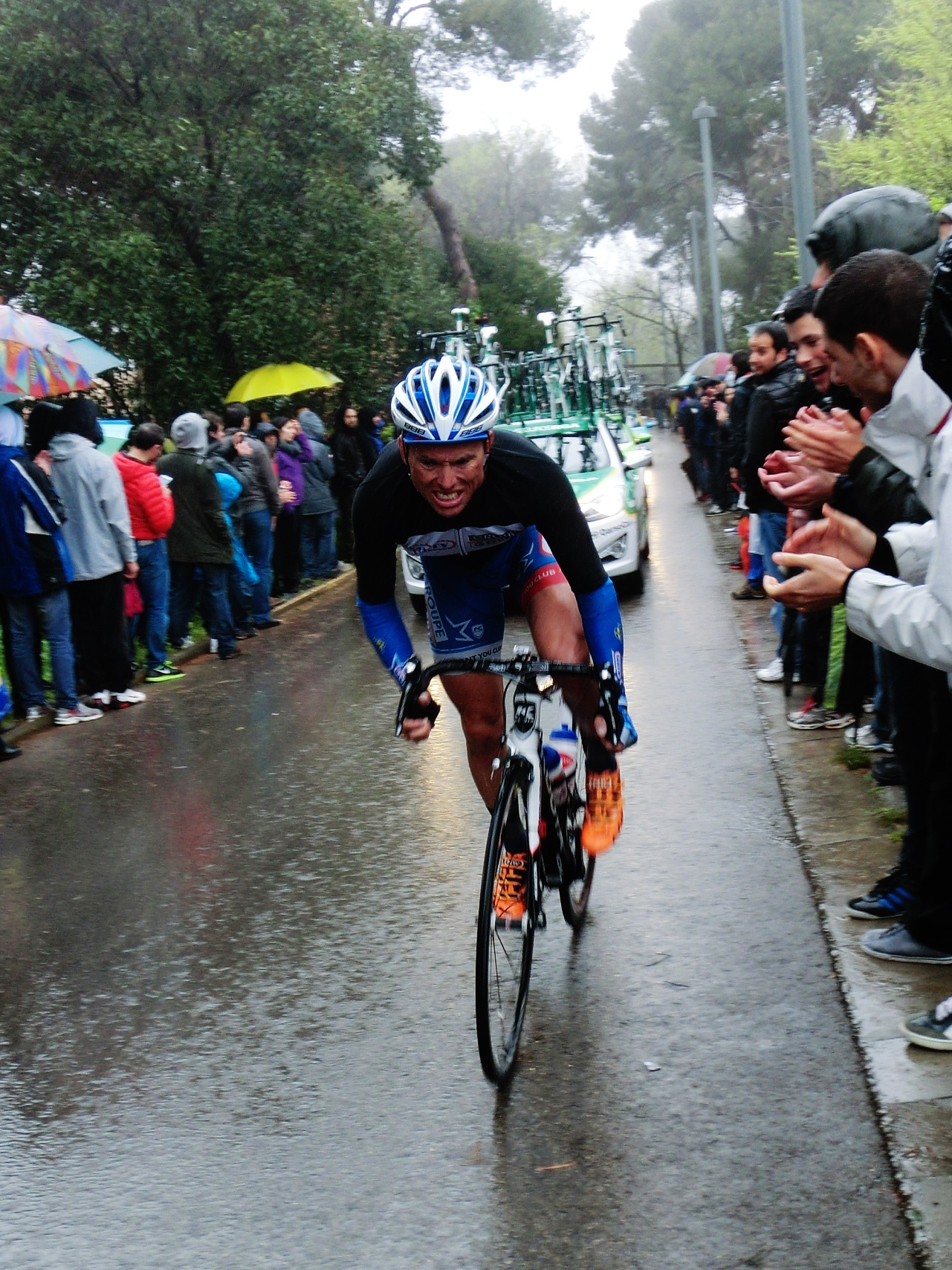
- Sijmens at the 2014 Volta a Catalunya.

Personal information
- Full name: Nico Sijmens
- Born: 1 April 1978 (age 48) Diest, Belgium
- Height: 1.77 m (5 ft 9 1/2 in)
- Weight: 67 kg (148 lb)

Cycling career
- Sport: Cycling
- Current team: Retired
- Discipline: Road
- Role: Rider

Amateur team
- 1999: ASLK

Professional teams
- 2001–2003: Vlaanderen–T Interim
- 2004–2008: Landbouwkrediet–Colnago
- 2009–2013: Cofidis
- 2014: Wanty–Groupe Gobert

Nico Sijmens (born 1 April 1978 in Diest, Belgium) is a retired Belgian road racing cyclist, who competed professionally between 2001 and 2014. Sijmens rodes for the Vlaanderen–T Interim, Landbouwkrediet–Tönissteiner, Cofidis and Wanty–Groupe Gobert teams over his career.

== Career achievements ==
=== Major results ===
2002
4th Overall Vuelta a La Rioja
5th Le Samyn
2003
Tour of Austria

1st Stages 4 & 6

9th Clásica de Almería
10th Classic Loire Atlantique
2004
1st Grand Prix Pino Cerami
3rd Brabantse Pijl
3rd Grand Prix de Denain
8th Rund um Köln
9th Grand Prix de Wallonie
2005
1st Overall Regio-Tour

1st Stage 2

1st Hel van het Mergelland
2nd Brussel–Ingooigem
6th Grote Prijs Jef Scherens
9th Overall Tour de Wallonie
2006
2nd Overall Tour de Wallonie

1st Stage 3

6th Tour du Doubs
8th Overall Driedaagse van West-Vlaanderen
8th Grote Prijs Jef Scherens
10th Hel van het Mergelland
10th Le Samyn
2007
1st Beverbeek Classic
1st Hel van het Mergelland
7th Tour de la Somme
9th Grand Prix de Wallonie
2008
2nd Boucles de l'Aulne
4th Le Samyn
8th Tour du Haut Var
9th Hel van het Mergelland
9th Grand Prix de Plumelec-Morbihan
10th Brabantse Pijl
2009
7th Paris–Brussels
2010
1st Stage 15 Vuelta a España
2011
9th Halle–Ingooigem
2012
2nd Overall Boucles de la Mayenne

1st Stage 2

8th Overall Tour de Picardie
2013
1st Overall Rhône-Alpes Isère Tour

1st Points classification
1st Stage 3

10th Overall Tour de Luxembourg
2014
7th Boucles de l'Aulne

=== Grand Tour general classification results timeline ===
Grand Tour	2004	2005	2006	2007	2008	2009	2010	2011	2012	2013
Giro d'Italia	68	—	—	—	—	—	104	—	—	—
Tour de France	—	—	—	—	—	—	—	—	—	—
Vuelta a España	—	—	—	—	—	—	96	73	87	78

Legend
—	Did not compete
DNF	Did not finish
