= Antje =

Antje /ˈɑːntjə/ is a female name. It is a Low German and Dutch diminutive form of Anna. Once a very common name in the northern part of the Netherlands, its popularity has steadily declined since 1900.

== People ==
- Antje "Nina" Baanders-Kessler (1915–2002), Dutch sculptor and medalist
- Antje Blumenthal (born 1947), German politician, member of the Christian Democratic Union
- Antje Boetius (born 1967), German marine biologist
- Antje Buschschulte (born 1978), German swimmer
- Antje Duvekot (born 1976), singer-songwriter and guitarist based in Somerville, Massachusetts
- Antje Danielson (born 1957), German-born American geochemist, co-founder of Zipcar
- Antje Frank (born 1968), German rower
- Antje Garden (1951–1993), German television presenter
- Antje Gleichfeld (born 1938), German middle-distance runner who specialized in the 800 metres
- Antje Harvey (born 1967), German cross country skier and biathlete
- Antje Hermenau (born 1964), German politician
- Antje Huber (1924–2015), German Minister for Youth, Family and Health
- Antje Jackelén (born 1955), Swedish Lutheran Archbishop of Uppsala
- Antje-Katrin Kühnemann (born 1945), German medical doctor and TV presenter of health related programs
- Antje Majewski (born 1968), German painter and contemporary artist
- Antje Angela Malestein (born 1993), Dutch handball player
- Antje Geertje "Ans" Markus (born 1947), Dutch painter
- Antje Möldner-Schmidt (born 1984), German middle-distance runner
- Antje Mönning (born 1978), German actress
- Antje Paarlberg (1808–1885), Dutch emigrant to the United States, inspiration for the novel "So Big"
- Antje Richter, German-American academic and Sinologist
- Antje Elisabeth "Anne" van Schuppen (born 1960), Dutch long-distance runner
- Antje Stille (born 1961), East German swimmer
- Antje Rávic Strubel (born 1974), German writer
- Antje Töpfer (born 1968), German Green Party politician
- Antje Traue (born 1981), German actress
- Antje Vollmer (1943–2023), German Green Party politician
- Antje Vowinckel (born 1964), German radio artist and musician
- Antje Weithaas (born 1966), German classical violinist
- Antje Zöllkau (born 1963), East German javelin thrower

== Animals ==
- Antje (1976–2003), former mascot of German broadcaster Norddeutscher Rundfunk.

== Fictional ==
- Frau Antje, fictional Dutch character used in the advertising of Dutch cheese in Germany

== See also ==
- Annie, an alternative diminutive of Anna
