= The Truth of Lie =

- Film poster
- German: Die Wahrheit der Lüge
- Directed by: Roland Reber
- Written by: Roland Reber
- Produced by: Patricia Koch; Marina Anna Eich, Antje Nikola Mönning, Roland Reber
- Starring: Marina Anna Eich, Christoph Baumann; Antje Nikola Mönning; Julia Jaschke
- Cinematography: Mira Gittner
- Edited by: Mira Gittner
- Music by: Wolfgang Edelmayer
- Distributed by: WTP International GmbH
- Release date: October 2011 (Hofer Filmtage)
- Running time: 98 minutes
- Country: Germany
- Language: German

The Truth of Lie (German: Die Wahrheit der Lüge) is a 2011 German psycho-thriller directed by Roland Reber. It was first shown at the Hof International Film Festival in October 2011, and released in 2012.

== Background ==
Shot on an Arri Alexa camera, it had its theatrical release on 29 March 2012 in German cinemas and its DVD and Blu-ray release on 27 July 2012.

== Festival attendances ==
- Hof International Film Festival, Oct 2011
- International Film Festival of India, Nov 2011
- International Chennai Filmfestival, India, Dec 2011
- Pune International Filmfestival, India, Jan 2012
- Fantasporto International Filmfestival, Feb 2012
- Sitges International Filmfestival, Oct 2012
- Cairo International Film Festival, Dec 2012
