= Matthé Pronk =

Dutch cyclist

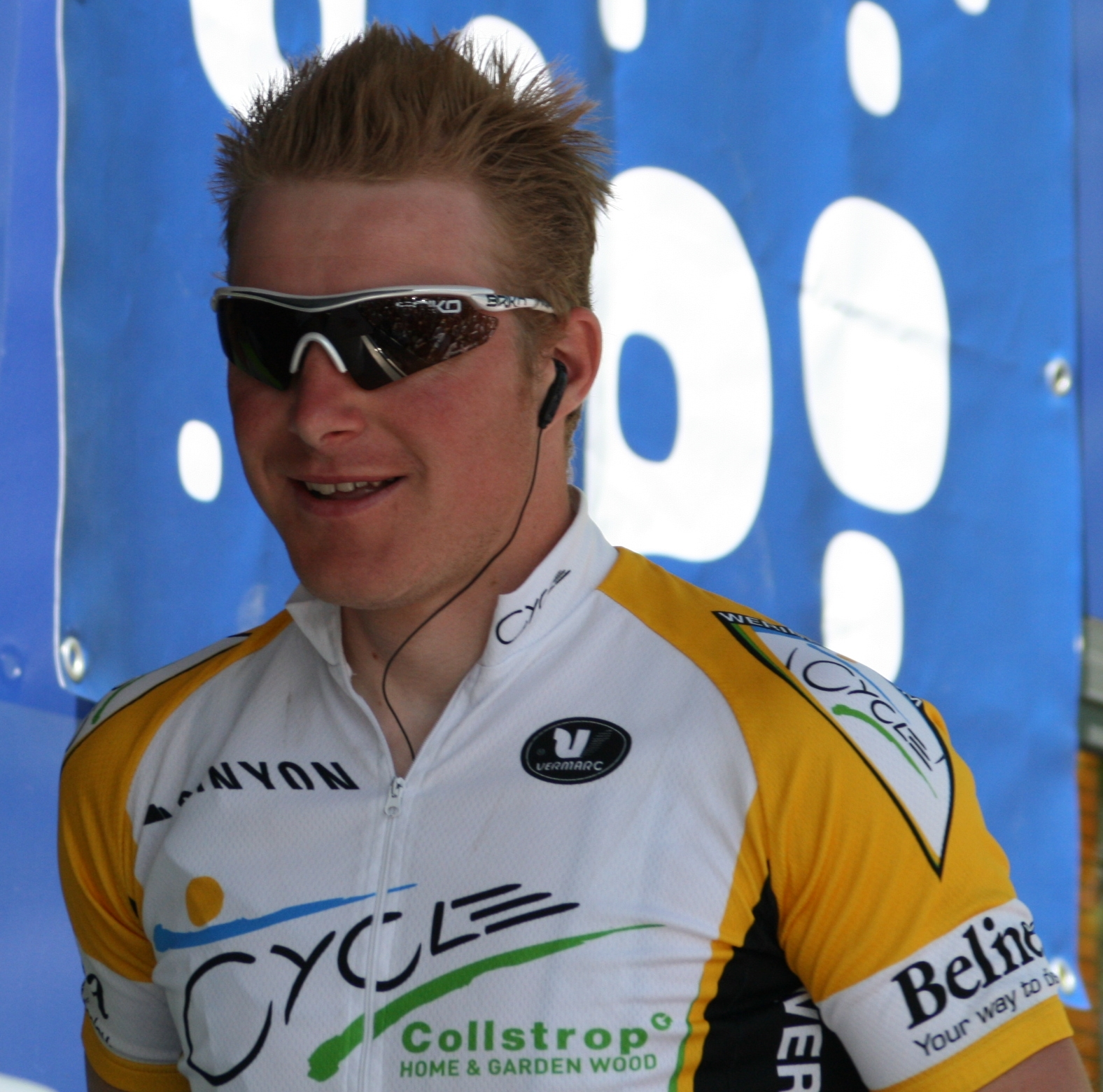
- Pronk at the 2008 Four Days of Dunkirk

Personal information
- Full name: Matthé Pronk
- Born: 1 July 1974 (age 52) Warmenhuizen, Netherlands
- Height: 1.76 m (5 ft 9 in)

Cycling career
- Sport: Cycling
- Disciplines: Road; Track
- Role: Rider

Professional teams
- 1999–2002: Rabobank
- 2003–2004: Bankgiroloterij
- 2005–2008: Cycle Collstrop
- 2009–2010: Vacansoleil
- 2011–2012: Marco Polo

Matthé Pronk (born 1 July 1974 in Warmenhuizen) is a Dutch former professional road bicycle racer.

He grew up in a family of cyclists: Mattheus Pronk was his father, Jos Pronk is his brother and Bas Giling is his cousin.

== Major results ==
1996
National Track Championships

1st Scratch
2nd Madison

1997
1st Overall Tour de la province de Liège

1st Stages 1 & 2

1st Stage 1 Tour de Wallonie
1998
1st Overall Olympia's Tour
1st Internationale Wielertrofee Jong Maar Moedig
1st Stage 5 Circuit des Mines
6th Hel van het Mergelland
1999
6th Nokere Koerse
2000
2nd GP Rik Van Steenbergen
5th Le Samyn
9th GP Stad Zottegem
10th Henk Vos Memorial
2001
3rd Omloop Het Volk
3rd Giro del Piemonte
3rd Points race, National Track Championships
7th Henk Vos Memorial
9th Milano–Torino
2002
1st Grote Prijs Stad Zottegem
2nd Trofeo Calvià
3rd Points race, National Track Championships
5th GP Rik Van Steenbergen
9th Trofeo Cala Millor-Cala Bona
10th Grote Prijs Jef Scherens
2003
National Track Championships

1st Derny
1st Madison (with Jos Pronk)
1st Points race
2nd Scratch

1st Druivenkoers Overijse
1st Nokere Koerse
2nd Ronde van Noord-Holland
4th Rund um den Flughafen Köln-Bonn
7th GP Stad Vilvoorde
9th Overall Driedaagse van West Vlaanderen
9th Grand Prix d'Isbergues
10th Veenendaal–Veenendaal
2004
World Derny Hour Record (66,11 km)
1st Profronde van Fryslan (with 21 others)
2nd Points race, National Track Championships
5th Overall Sachsen-Tour
6th Nationale Sluitingprijs
6th Trofeo Alcudia
8th Paris–Brussels
9th Trofeo Calvià
2005
2nd Flèche Hesbignonne
7th Overall Étoile de Bessèges
7th Nokere Koerse
10th Grote Prijs Jef Scherens
2006
2nd Derny, European Track Championships
6th Grand Prix d'Isbergues
2007
1st Derny, UEC European Track Championships
8th Grote Prijs Jef Scherens
2008
1st Derny, UEC European Track Championships
