= UEC European Track Championships – Derny =

Elite level championships

European Champion Jersey

The European Champion Jersey, from 2016

The race behind derny is one of the 2 motor-paced racing disciplines of the annual UEC European Track Championships.

Since late 1961, private organizers of track cycling events organized championships (European Criterion or Winter championship) during the Winter months.

The sub federation for professional cycling of the UCI, the FICP organized official European championships (called Championnats d'Hiver) between 1971/72 and 1990.

Since 1995 the European Cycling Union is responsible for this event, which is no longer an event for professionals only.

In 2004 and 2010, the derny competition was cancelled for organizational reasons.

From 2019, the event is also held for woman.

== Men's Medalists ==
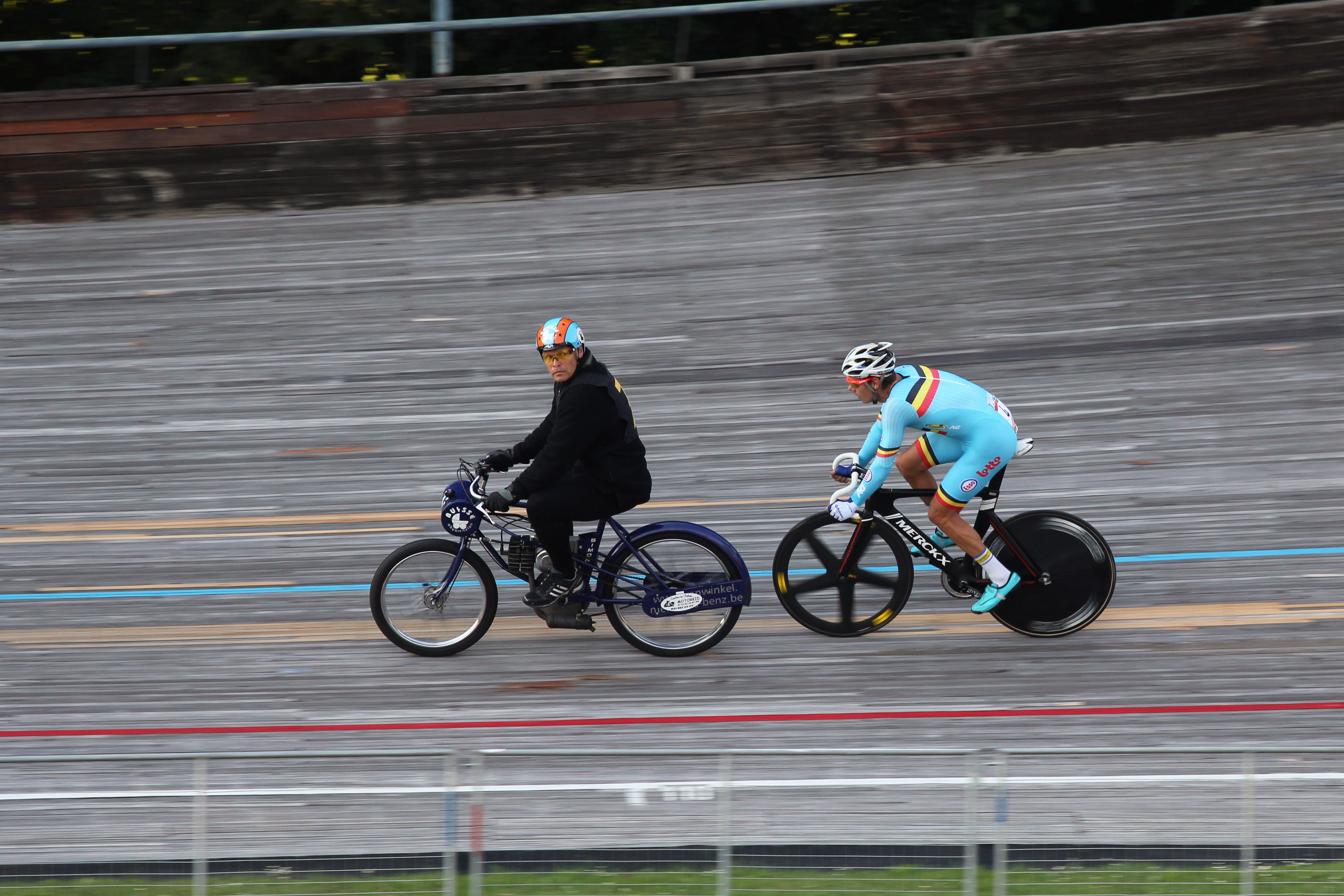
Kenny De Ketele following Michel Vaarten at the 2015 European Derny Championship in Hanover

Championship	Gold	Silver	Bronze
European Criterion or Winter Championship
1962 Berlin	(Netherlands) Peter Post	(West Germany) Klaus Bugdahl	(Belgium) Rik Van Looy
1963 Antwerp	(Netherlands) Peter Post	(Belgium) Rik Van Steenbergen	(Denmark) Palle Lykke
1964 Antwerp	(Netherlands) Peter Post	(Belgium) Rik Van Steenbergen	(Denmark) Palle Lykke
1965 Antwerp	(Netherlands) Peter Post	(Belgium) Theo Verschueren	(Belgium) Guillaume Van Tongerloo
1966 Antwerp	(Netherlands) Peter Post	(Belgium) Leo Proost	(Netherlands) Jaap Oudkerk
1967 Berlin	(Netherlands) Peter Post	(Denmark) Palle Lykke	(West Germany) Wolfgang Schulze
1968 Antwerp	(Belgium) Theo Verschueren	(Belgium) Leo Proost	(Netherlands) Peter Post
1969 Antwerp	(Netherlands) Peter Post	(Belgium) Theo Verschueren	(Belgium) Leo Proost
1970 Antwerp	(Netherlands) Peter Post	(Belgium) Theo Verschueren	(Belgium) Romain De Loof
1971 Antwerp	(Belgium) Theo Verschueren	(Netherlands) Leo Duyndam	(France) Alain van Lancker
FICP European Derny Championship
1972 Köln	(Belgium) Theo Verschueren	(Australia) Graeme Gilmore	(West Germany) Hans Junkermann
1973 Antwerp	(Belgium) Theo Verschueren	(Netherlands) Cees Stam	(Belgium) Ferdinand Bracke
1974 Rotterdam	(West Germany) Theo Verschueren	(Netherlands) René Pijnen	(Australia) Graeme Gilmore
1975 Dortmund	(West Germany) Günter Haritz	(Australia) Graeme Gilmore	(Netherlands) Cees Stam
1976 Berlin	(Denmark) Ole Ritter	(West Germany) Dieter Kemper	(Netherlands) Cees Stam
1977 Rotterdam	(Belgium) Patrick Sercu	(West Germany) Dieter Kemper	(Denmark) Ole Ritter
1978 Rotterdam	(Netherlands) René Pijnen	(Belgium) Patrick Sercu	(Netherlands) Martin Venix
1979 Frankfurt	(West Germany) Dietrich Thurau	(Netherlands) René Pijnen	(Liechtenstein) Roman Hermann
1980 Vienna	(West Germany) Dietrich Thurau	(Belgium) Patrick Sercu	(Netherlands) Martin Venix
1981 Rotterdam	(Netherlands) Gerrie Knetemann	(Netherlands) Joop Zoetemelk	(Netherlands) Bert Oosterbosch
1982 Kopenhagen	(Netherlands) Gerrie Knetemann	(Denmark) Gert Frank	(Netherlands) René Pijnen
1983	Not held		
1984 Zürich	(Denmark) Gert Frank	(Switzerland) Hans Känel	(Belgium) Constant Tourné
1985 Stuttgart	(Australia) Danny Clark	(Belgium) Constant Tourné	(Netherlands) René Pijnen
1986 Stuttgart	(Australia) Danny Clark	(Belgium) Constant Tourné	(United Kingdom) Anthony Doyle
1987 Stuttgart	(Belgium) Constant Tourné	(Australia) Danny Clark	(West Germany) Uwe Bolten
1988 Zürich	(Belgium) Constant Tourné	(France) Laurent Biondi	(Liechtenstein) Roman Hermann
1989 Kopenhagen	(Belgium) Luc Colijn	(Australia) Danny Clark	(Netherlands) Ad Wijnands
1990 Gent	(Australia) Danny Clark	(Belgium) Constant Tourné	(Germany) Roland Günther
1991 Grenoble	(Belgium) Constant Tourné	(France) Laurent Biondi	(Belgium) Luc Colijn
1992–1999	Not held		
UEC European Derny Championship
2000 Amsterdam	(Denmark) Jimmi Madsen	(Germany) Stefan Steinweg	(Belgium) Matthew Gilmore
2001 Antwerp	(Belgium) Matthew Gilmore	(Netherlands) Robert Slippens	(Denmark) Jimmi Madsen
2002 Amsterdam	(Belgium) Matthew Gilmore	(Austria) Franz Stocher	(Germany) Gerd Dörich
2003 Newport	(United Kingdom) Bradley Wiggins	(Belgium) Steven De Neef	(Netherlands) Robert Slippens
2004	Not held		
2005 Dalmine	(Russia) Alexey Shmidt	(Russia) Konstantin Ponomarev	(Germany) Christian Grasmann
2006 Kopenhagen	(Belgium) Iljo Keisse	(Netherlands) Matthé Pronk	(Germany) Stefan Löffler
2007 Alkmaar	(Netherlands) Matthé Pronk	(Belgium) Iljo Keisse	(Netherlands) Jos Pronk
2008 Alkmaar	(Netherlands) Matthé Pronk	(Russia) Alexey Markov	(Denmark) Michael Mørkøv
2009 Gent	(Belgium) Kenny De Ketele	(Netherlands) Matthé Pronk	(Germany) Roger Kluge
2010	Not held		
2011 Montichiari	(Netherlands) Peter Schep	(Netherlands) Jeff Vermeulen	(Italy) Manuel Cazzaro
2012 Montichiari	(Italy) Davide Viganò	(Denmark) Jesper Mørkøv	(Netherlands) Peter Schep
2013 Montichiari	(Italy) Elia Viviani	(Germany) Theo Reinhardt	(Italy) Marco Coledan
2014 Ballerup	(Denmark) Jesper Mørkøv	(Germany) Achim Burkart	(Austria) Andreas Graf
2015 Hanover	(Belgium) Kenny De Ketele	(Italy) Davide Viganò	(Netherlands) Jesper Asselman
2016 Ballerup	(Denmark) Casper von Folsach	(Netherlands) Jesper Asselman	(Austria) Andreas Graf
2017 Hanover	(Germany) Achim Burkart	(Germany) Christoph Schweizer	(Italy) Riccardo Minali
2018 Erfurt	(Netherlands) Nick van der Lijke	(Netherlands) Maikel Zijlaard	(Germany) Achim Burkart
2019 Pordenone	(Germany) Achim Burkart	(Netherlands) Yoeri Havik	(Germany) Marcel Franz
2020–2024	Not held		
2025 Erfurt	(Germany) Moritz Augenstein	(Czech Republic) Adam Křenek	(Poland) Filip Prokopyszyn

== Woman's Medalists ==
Championship	Gold	Silver	Bronze
UEC European Derny Championship
2019 Pordenone	(Italy) Marta Cavalli	(Netherlands) Marit Raaijmakers	(Germany) Romy Kasper

== See also ==
- UEC European Track Championships – Men's keirin
