= 1973 Grote Prijs Jef Scherens =

Race details
- Dates: 16 September 1973
- Stages: 1
- Distance: 180 km (111.8 mi)
- Winning time: 4h 22' 00"

Results
	Winner	Jan van Katwijk (NED)
	Second	Victor Van Schil (BEL)
	Third	Theo van der Leeuw (NED)

The 1973 Grote Prijs Jef Scherens was the ninth edition of the Grote Prijs Jef Scherens cycle race and was held on 16 September 1973. The race started and finished in Leuven. The race was won by Jan van Katwijk.

== General classification ==
Final general classification

Rank	Rider	Time
1	Jan van Katwijk (NED)	4h 22' 00"
2	Victor Van Schil (BEL)	+ 0"
3	Theo van der Leeuw (NED)	+ 0"
4	Louis Verreydt (BEL)	+ 0"
5	Jean-Pierre Berckmans (BEL)	+ 0"
6	Joseph Bruyère (BEL)	+ 0"
7	Roger Kindt (BEL)	+ 0"
8	Antoine Houbrechts (BEL)	+ 0"
9	Edward Janssens (BEL)	+ 0"
10	Jozef Spruyt (BEL)	+ 0"
