= 1991 Grote Prijs Jef Scherens =

Race details
- Dates: 22 September 1991
- Stages: 1
- Distance: 181 km (112.5 mi)
- Winning time: 4h 09' 00"

Results
| | Winner | Wilco Zuijderwijk (NED) |
| | Second | Olaf Jentzsch (GER) |
| | Third | Hendrik Redant (BEL) |

The 1991 Grote Prijs Jef Scherens was the 25th edition of the Grote Prijs Jef Scherens cycle race and was held on 22 September 1991. The race started and finished in Leuven. The race was won by Wilco Zuijderwijk.

== General classification ==
Final general classification

| Rank | Rider | Time |
|---|---|---|
| 1 | Wilco Zuijderwijk (NED) | 4h 09' 00" |
| 2 | Olaf Jentzsch (GER) | + 0" |
| 3 | Hendrik Redant (BEL) | + 22" |
| 4 | Jerry Cooman (BEL) | + 22" |
| 5 | Michel Cornelisse (NED) | + 22" |
| 6 | Johan Capiot (BEL) | + 22" |
| 7 | Herman Frison (BEL) | + 22" |
| 8 | Patrick Van Roosbroeck (BEL) | + 22" |
| 9 | Mario Gutte (NED) | + 22" |
| 10 | Didier Priem (BEL) | + 22" |
