= 1994 Grote Prijs Jef Scherens =

Race details
- Dates: 4 September 1994
- Stages: 1
- Distance: 173 km (107.5 mi)
- Winning time: 4h 13' 00"

Results
	Winner	Mauro Bettin (ITA)
	Second	Johan Verstrepen (BEL)
	Third	Jans Koerts (NED)

The 1994 Grote Prijs Jef Scherens was the 28th edition of the Grote Prijs Jef Scherens cycle race and was held on 4 September 1994. The race started and finished in Leuven. The race was won by Mauro Bettin.

== General classification ==
Final general classification

Rank	Rider	Time
1	Mauro Bettin (ITA)	4h 13' 00"
2	Johan Verstrepen (BEL)	+ 0"
3	Jans Koerts (NED)	+ 12"
4	Peter Wuyts (BEL)	+ 12"
5	Jesper Skibby (DEN)	+ 12"
6	Wilfried Nelissen (BEL)	+ 12"
7	Carlo Bomans (BEL)	+ 12"
8	Wilfried Peeters (BEL)	+ 12"
9	Jacques Jolidon (SUI)	+ 12"
10	Jo Planckaert (BEL)	+ 12"
