= Mattheus Pronk =

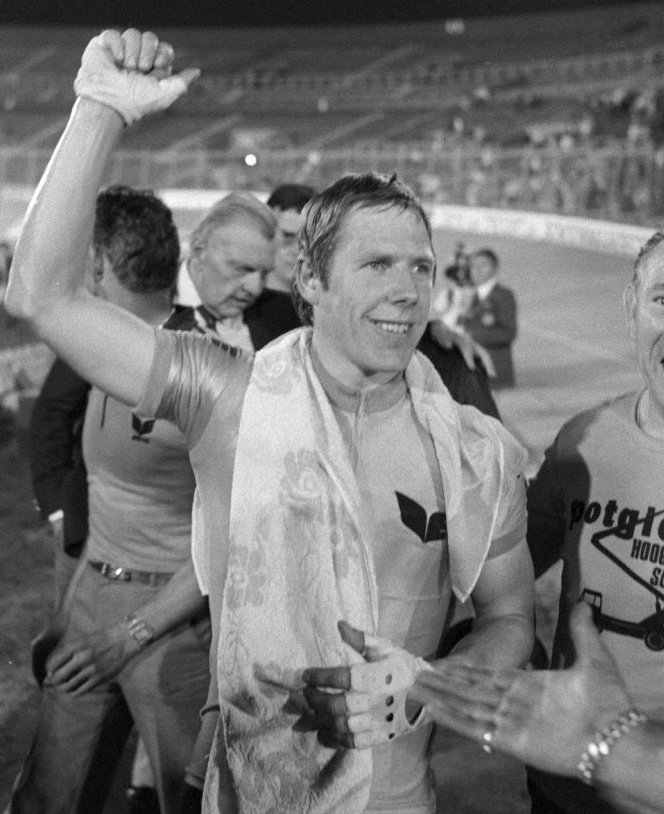
- Mattheus Pronk in 1979

Personal information
- Full name: Mattheus Adrianus "Matthé" Pronk
- Born: 27 March 1947 't Zand, Zijpe, the Netherlands
- Died: 25 March 2001 (aged 53) Warmenhuizen, the Netherlands

Sport
- Sport: Motor-paced racing
Medal record
Representing the Netherlands
World Championships
| Silver medal – second place | 1978 Munich | Amateurs |
| Gold medal – first place | 1979 Amsterdam | Amateurs |
| Silver medal – second place | 1980 Besancon | Amateurs |
| Gold medal – first place | 1981 Brno | Amateurs |
| Silver medal – second place | 1982 Leicester | Amateurs |
| Silver medal – second place | 1983 Zurich | Amateurs |

Mattheus Adrianus "Matthé" Pronk (27 March 1947 – 25 March 2001) was a cyclist from the Netherlands who won the Amateur UCI Motor-paced World Championships in 1979 and 1981. He finished in second place in 1988, 1980, 1982 and 1983. He won the national titles in this event in 1977 and 1979. He was the father of three children including cyclists Jos Pronk (b. 1983) and Matthé Pronk (b. 1974). Besides cycling he worked as a carpenter.
