= Tour of Leuven =

Belgian one-day road cycling race

Grote Prijs Jef Scherens

Race details
- Date: Early September
- Region: Leuven, Belgium
- English name: Grand Prix Jef Scherens
- Local name(s): Grote Prijs Jef Scherens (in Dutch); Grote Prijs Poeske Scherens (in Dutch)
- Discipline: Road race
- Competition: UCI Europe Tour
- Type: Single-day
- Web site: tourofleuven.be

History
- First edition: 1963
- Editions: 57 (as of 2024)
- First winner: Marcel Van Den Bogaert (BEL)
- Most wins: Frans Verbeeck (BEL) (4 wins)
- Most recent: Markus Hoelgaard (NOR)

Tour of Leuven - Memorial Jef Scherens (until 2021 Grote Prijs Jef Scherens) is a single-day road bicycle race held annually in September in Leuven, Belgium. Since 2005, the race is organized as a 1.1 event on the UCI Europe Tour. The race is named after the seven-time professional sprint world champion Jef Scherens.

The local city circuit from the 2021 UCI Road World Championships, hosted in Leuven, was largely based on the circuit that is ridden during the Grote Prijs Jef Scherens.

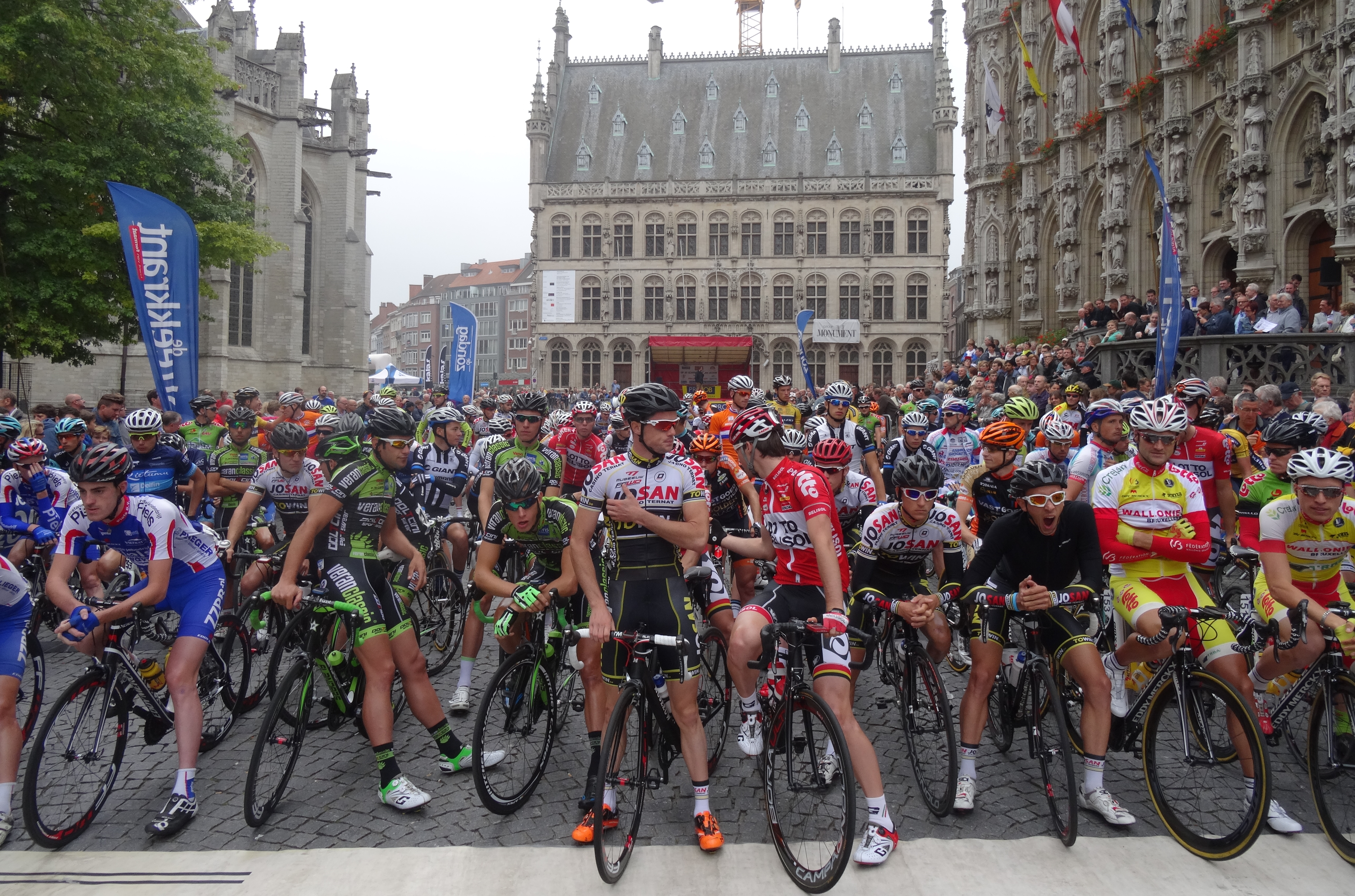
14 september 2014: departure in Leuven

== Winners ==
Year	Country	Rider	Team
1963	Belgium	Marcel Van Den Bogaert	G.B.C. Libertas
1964	Belgium	Norbert Kerckhove	Labo–Dr. Mann
1965	Belgium	Fernand Deferm	Dr. Mann
1966	Belgium	Herman van Springel	Mann–Grundig
1967	Belgium	Robert Lelangue	Romeo–Smith's
1968	No race		
1969	Belgium	Frans Verbeeck	Okay Whisky–Diamant
1970	Belgium	Frans Verbeeck	Geens–Watney
1971	Belgium	Frans Verbeeck	Watney–Avia
1972	Belgium	Gustaaf Hermans	amateur
1973	Netherlands	Jan van Katwijk	IJsboerke–Bertin
1974	Belgium	Freddy Maertens	Carpenter–Flandria
1975	Belgium	Freddy Maertens	Carprnter-Flandria
1976	Belgium	Frans Verbeeck	IJsboerke–Colnago
1977	Belgium	Walter Planckaert	Maes Pils–Mini Flat
1978	Belgium	Frans Van Looy	Mini Flat–Boule d'Or
1979	Belgium	Marcel Laurens	Marc Zeepcentrale–Superia
1980	Belgium	Ludo Delcroix	IJsboerke–Warncke Eis
1981	Netherlands	Jan Raas	TI–Raleigh
1982	Belgium	Rudy Matthijs	Boule d'Or–Sunair
1983	Netherlands	Adri van der Poel	Jacky Aernoudt Meubelen–Rossin–Campagnolo
1984	Belgium	Ronny van Holen	Safir–Van de Ven
1985	Belgium	Jozef Lieckens	Lotto
1986	Belgium	Jozef Lieckens	Lotto–Emerxil–Merckx
1987	Belgium	Ronny van Holen	Lucas-Arkel-Atlanta
1988	Belgium	Patrick Schoovaerts	amateur
1989	No race		
1990	Belgium	Wilfried Peeters	Histor–Sigma
1991	Netherlands	Wilco Zuijderwijk	Buckler–Colnago–Decca
1992	Belgium	Hendrik Redant	Lotto–Mavic–MBK
1993	Netherlands	Frans Maassen	WordPerfect–Colnago–Decca
1994	Italy	Mauro Bettin	GB–MG Maglificio
1995	Netherlands	Erik Dekker	Novell–Decca–Colnago
1996	Netherlands	Jans Koerts	Palmans-Boghemans
1997	Belgium	Stéphane Hennebert	Tönissteiner–Colnago
1998	Belgium	Jo Planckaert	Lotto–Mobistar
1999	Belgium	Marc Streel	home–Jack & Jones
2000	Belgium	Dave Bruylandts	Palmans–Ideal
2001	Belgium	Niko Eeckhout	Cofidis
2002	Germany	Andreas Klier	Team Telekom
2003	Norway	Thor Hushovd	Crédit Agricole
2004	Denmark	Allan Johansen	BankGiroLoterij
2005	Netherlands	Joost Posthuma	Rabobank
2006	Germany	Marcel Sieberg	Team Wiesenhof-AKUD
2007	Netherlands	Bram Tankink	Quick-Step–Innergetic
2008	Netherlands	Wouter Mol	P3 Transfer–Batavus
2009	Netherlands	Sebastian Langeveld	Rabobank
2010	Netherlands	Lars Boom	Rabobank
2011	France	Jérôme Pineau	Quick-Step
2012	Belgium	Steven Caethoven	Accent.jobs–Willems Veranda's
2013	Belgium	Bert De Backer	Argos–Shimano
2014	Germany	André Greipel	Lotto–Belisol
2015	Belgium	Björn Leukemans	Wanty–Groupe Gobert
2016	Belgium	Dimitri Claeys	Wanty–Groupe Gobert
2017	Belgium	Timothy Dupont	Vérandas Willems–Crelan
2018	Belgium	Jasper Stuyven	Trek–Segafredo
2019	Italy	Niccolò Bonifazio	Total Direct Énergie
2020	No race due to COVID-19 pandemic in Belgium		
2021	Italy	Niccolò Bonifazio	Team TotalEnergies
2022	Belgium	Victor Campenaerts	Lotto–Soudal
2023	Belgium	Arnaud De Lie	Lotto–Dstny
2024	Norway	Markus Hoelgaard	Uno-X Mobility
