= 1970 Grote Prijs Jef Scherens =

Race details
- Dates: 20 September 1970
- Stages: 1
- Distance: 205 km (127.4 mi)
- Winning time: 5h 22' 00"

Results
	Winner	Frans Verbeeck (BEL)
	Second	Raf Hooyberghs (BEL)
	Third	Jos Abelshausen (BEL)

The 1970 Grote Prijs Jef Scherens was the seventh edition of the Grote Prijs Jef Scherens cycle race and was held on 20 September 1970. The race started and finished in Leuven. The race was won by Frans Verbeeck.

== General classification ==
Final general classification

Rank	Rider	Time
1	Frans Verbeeck (BEL)	5h 22' 00"
2	Raf Hooyberghs (BEL)	+ 0"
3	Jos Abelshausen (BEL)	+ 30"
4	Alfons De Bal (BEL)	+ 30"
5	Maurice Eyers (BEL)	+ 30"
6	Etienne Sonck (BEL)	+ 2' 00"
7	Fernand Van Rijmenant (BEL)	+ 2' 00"
8	Willy Van den Eynde (BEL)	+ 2' 00"
9	Giovanni Jimenez Ocampo (COL)	+ 2' 00"
10	Roger Kindt (BEL)	+ 2' 00"
