= 2005 Grote Prijs Jef Scherens =

Race details
- Dates: 4 September 2005
- Stages: 1
- Distance: 183 km (113.7 mi)
- Winning time: 4h 16' 00"

Results
	Winner	Joost Posthuma (NED)
	Second	Björn Leukemans (BEL)
	Third	Rory Sutherland (AUS)

The 2005 Grote Prijs Jef Scherens was the 39th edition of the Grote Prijs Jef Scherens cycle race and was held on 4 September 2005. The race started and finished in Leuven. The race was won by Joost Posthuma.

== General classification ==
Final general classification

Rank	Rider	Time
1	Joost Posthuma (NED)	4h 16' 00"
2	Björn Leukemans (BEL)	+ 2' 00"
3	Rory Sutherland (AUS)	+ 2' 00"
4	Wouter Van Mechelen (BEL)	+ 2' 23"
5	Aart Vierhouten (NED)	+ 2' 23"
6	Nico Sijmens (BEL)	+ 2' 23"
7	Johnny Hoogerland (NED)	+ 2' 23"
8	Patrik Sinkewitz (GER)	+ 2' 23"
9	Maarten Neyens (BEL)	+ 2' 23"
10	Matthé Pronk (NED)	+ 2' 59"
