= 1963 Grote Prijs Jef Scherens =

Race details
- Dates: 8 May 1963
- Stages: 1
- Distance: 200 km (124.3 mi)
- Winning time: 5h 02' 00"

Results
| | Winner | Marcel Van Den Bogaert (BEL) |
| | Second | Francesco Miele (ITA) |
| | Third | Walter Muylaert (BEL) |

The 1963 Grote Prijs Jef Scherens was the inaugural edition of the Grote Prijs Jef Scherens cycle race and was held on 8 May 1963. The race started and finished in Leuven. The race was won by Marcel Van Den Bogaert.

== General classification ==
Final general classification

| Rank | Rider | Time |
|---|---|---|
| 1 | Marcel Van Den Bogaert (BEL) | 5h 02' 00" |
| 2 | Francesco Miele (ITA) | + 0" |
| 3 | Walter Muylaert (BEL) | + 25" |
| 4 | Eddy Pauwels (BEL) | + 25" |
| 5 | Ferdinand Bracke (BEL) | + 25" |
| 6 | Joseph Bosmans (BEL) | + 1' 00" |
| 7 | Guillaume Demaer (BEL) | + 2' 15" |
| 8 | Jean Simon (BEL) | + 2' 15" |
| 9 | André Bar (BEL) | + 11' 00" |
| 10 | Etienne Vercauteren (BEL) | + 11' 15" |
