= Marina Anna Eich =

German film actress and producer

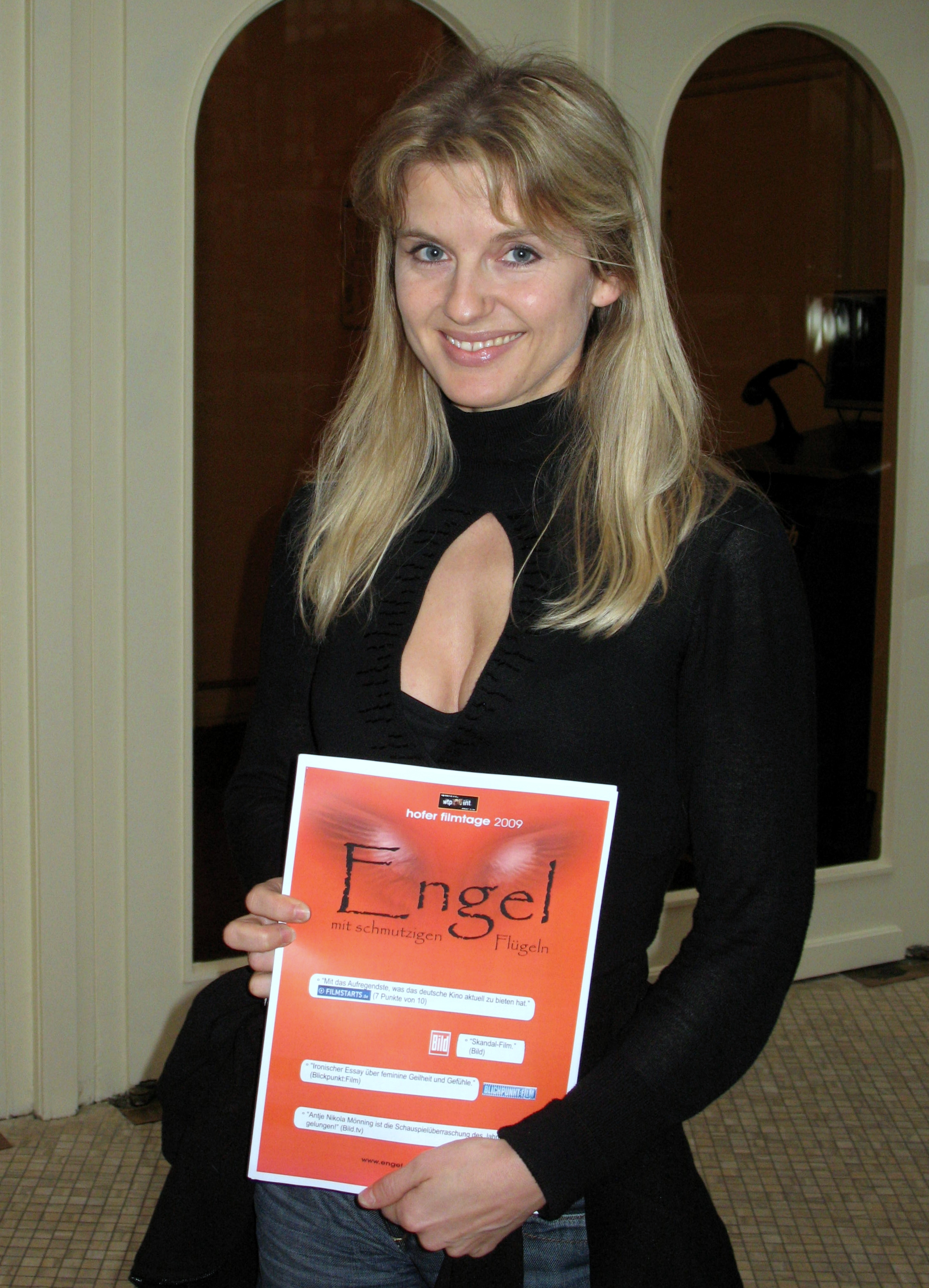
- Marina Anna Eich in der Astor Film Lounge Berlin
- Born: 17 December 1976 (age 49); Garmisch-Partenkirchen, West Germany
- Occupations: film actress and producer

Marina Anna Eich (born 17 December 1976) is a German film actress and producer.

== Life and career ==
Eich was born in Garmisch-Partenkirchen, West Germany. After school she studied Spanish, English, and French in Ecuador, Canada, and France respectively, as well as dance and acting at the Dance Academy at the Opera Leipzig and at the University of Music and Performing Arts in Frankfurt.

Since 1994, Eich has participated as an actor and dancer in several film and cinema productions, including as Eva Braun in a documentary-feature for the Japanese television.

From 2000 to 2022 Eich worked for WTP International as an actor and producer, and is responsible for distribution, acquisition, public relations, and international sales. She co-produced the psychodrama The Truth of Lie (2011), the erotic drama Angels With Dirty Wings (2009), the dramedy Loneliness Never Walks Alone (2007), the erotic-drama 24/7: The Passion of Life (2005), the comedy Pentamagica (2002/2003), and the short Are Girls Werewolves...?.

Since 2008 Eich has also managed a DVD label which focuses on arthouse feature films and documentaries. From 2009/2010 she was press officer for the Fünf Seen Filmfestival (Five Lakes Film Festival) which takes place every July in Starnberg, Germany.

== Distinctions/awards ==
- 2002 Best Female Actor Award, Los Angeles (American Film Market for the film "dann nenn es halt Liebe“)
- 2003 - 2007 representative of the Cairo International Film Festival and the Damascus International Film Festival together with Roland Reber
- Since 2007 represented in the German "Who’s Who“

== Festival jury attendances ==
- Festival d´Amour de Mons, Belgien (Feb. 2007)
- Muscat International Film Festival, Oman (Jan.08)
- Festival Internacional de Catalunya, Sitges, Spanien (Okt. 08)
- International Film Festival Ourense, Spain (Okt.08)
- Fantasporto International Film Festival, Portugal (Feb. 09)
- Italian Film Festival in Annecy, France (Sept. 09)
- International Film Festival of India, Goa (Nov. 09)
- Landshuter Short Film Festival, Germany (March 10)
- Brussels International Fantastic Film Festival (April 13)

== Press comments ==
- "Lust, pain and passion" (Sueddeutsche Zeitung, 25 October 2011)
- "The truth of lie, nudity and life" (thirstyrabbit.net, September 2012)
- "There is more to German actor Marina Anna Eich than a photogenic face. She is a classical ballet dancer, a linguist...Marina Anna Eich’s acting talent is matched by her proficiency in marketing films...The party girl in The Dark Side of our Inner Space might appear bubbly in the initial scenes but Eich’s performance takes on a new dimension when she unwittingly starts playing with the lives of the other characters...“ (Hindustan Times, 12 November 2003, Pratik Ghosh)
- "I had fear of death" (face2face-magazin.de interview)

== Filmography (excerpt) ==
- 2011 The truth of lie (Cinema) Director: Roland Reber
- 2009 Angels with dirty wings (Cinema) Director: Roland Reber
- 2008 Break (Cinema) Director: Matthias Olof Eich
- 2007 My Dream or Loneliness never walks alone (Cinema) Director: Roland Reber
- 2005 24/7: The Passion of Life (Cinema) Director: Roland Reber
- 2004 The Dark Side of our inner Space (Cinema) Director: Roland Reber
- 2003 Pentamagica (Cinema) Director: Roland Reber
- 2002 Vienna (TV) Director: Peter Gersina
- 2001 Das Zimmer (Cinema) Director: Roland Reber
- 2001 dann nenn es halt Liebe (short) Director: Mira Gittner
- 2000 Josephine (Cinema) Director: Rajko Grlic
- 2000 Zwang (short) Director: Roland Reber
- 2000 Anatomy (Cinema) Director: Stefan Ruzowitzky
- 1999 Jagd auf Amor (TV) Director: Holger Barthel
- 1997 Hitler (docu-fiction, TV) Japan
