= Peter Wuyts =

Belgian cyclist

Personal information
- Born: 24 February 1973 (age 53) Turnhout, Belgium

Cycling career
- Sport: Cycling
- Current team: Retired
- Discipline: Road
- Role: Rider

Amateur team
- 1994: Saxon–Selle Italia (stagiaire)

Professional teams
- 1996: Tönissteiner–Saxon
- 1998: Vlaanderen 2002–Eddy Merckx
- 1999–2000: Lotto–Mobistar
- 2001–2003: Collstrop–Palmans
- 2004–2005: Mr. Bookmaker–Palmans–Collstrop
- 2006–2007: Palmans–Collstrop

Peter Wuyts (born 24 February 1973) is a Belgian former racing cyclist. He rode in the 1999 Tour de France.

== Major results ==
1994
4th Grote Prijs Jef Scherens
1997
1st Overall Tour de la province de Namur

1st Stage 2

7th Grote Prijs Jef Scherens
1998
1st Stage 4 Ronde van Nederland
6th Overall Tour de l'Avenir

1st Points classification
1st Stage 2

9th Overall Circuito Montañes
10th Overall Tour de la Region Wallonne
2002
8th Hel van het Mergelland
2004
2nd Schaal Sels
8th Grote Prijs Jef Scherens
10th Veenendaal–Veenendaal
2005
1st De Drie Zustersteden
