= 1993 Grote Prijs Jef Scherens =

Race details
- Dates: 5 September 1993
- Stages: 1
- Distance: 174 km (108.1 mi)
- Winning time: 4h 13' 00"

Results
	Winner	Frans Maassen (NED)
	Second	Herman Frison (BEL)
	Third	Wilfried Peeters (BEL)

The 1993 Grote Prijs Jef Scherens was the 27th edition of the Grote Prijs Jef Scherens cycle race and was held on 5 September 1993. The race started and finished in Leuven. The race was won by Frans Maassen.

== General classification ==
Final general classification

Rank	Rider	Time
1	Frans Maassen (NED)	4h 13' 00"
2	Herman Frison (BEL)	+ 45"
3	Wilfried Peeters (BEL)	+ 45"
4	Raymond Meijs (NED)	+ 45"
5	Frank Corvers (BEL)	+ 45"
6	Pierre Herinne (BEL)	+ 1' 04"
7	Marc Patry (BEL)	+ 1' 04"
8	Stéphane Hennebert (BEL)	+ 1' 04"
9	Christian Henn (GER)	+ 1' 04"
10	Rob Mulders (NED)	+ 1' 04"
