= 1971 Grote Prijs Jef Scherens =

Race details
- Dates: 19 September 1971
- Stages: 1
- Distance: 230 km (142.9 mi)
- Winning time: 5h 20' 00"

Results
	Winner	Frans Verbeeck (BEL)
	Second	Georges Pintens (BEL)
	Third	Edward Janssens (BEL)

The 1971 Grote Prijs Jef Scherens was the eighth edition of the Grote Prijs Jef Scherens cycle race and was held on 19 September 1971. The race started and finished in Leuven. The race was won by Frans Verbeeck.

== General classification ==
Final general classification

Rank	Rider	Time
1	Frans Verbeeck (BEL)	5h 20' 00"
2	Georges Pintens (BEL)	+ 0"
3	Edward Janssens (BEL)	+ 1' 10"
4	Hubert Hutsebaut (BEL)	+ 1' 10"
5	Willy De Geest (BEL)	+ 1' 10"
6	Jean-Pierre Baert (BEL)	+ 1' 10"
7	Maurice Eyers (BEL)	+ 1' 10"
8	Georges Claes jr. (BEL)	+ 1' 10"
9	Herman Beysens (BEL)	+ 1' 10"
10	Gustaaf Van Roosbroeck (BEL)	+ 1' 10"
