= 1965 Grote Prijs Jef Scherens =

Race details
- Dates: 8 May 1965
- Stages: 1
- Distance: 205 km (127.4 mi)
- Winning time: 4h 55' 00"

Results
	Winner	Fernand Deferm (BEL)
	Second	Eddy Merckx (BEL)
	Third	Emile Daems (BEL)

The 1965 Grote Prijs Jef Scherens was the third edition of the Grote Prijs Jef Scherens cycle race and was held on 8 May 1965. The race started and finished in Leuven. The race was won by Fernand Deferm.

== General classification ==
Final general classification

Rank	Rider	Time
1	Fernand Deferm (BEL)	4h 55' 00"
2	Eddy Merckx (BEL)	+ 0"
3	Emile Daems (BEL)	+ 0"
4	Marcel Van Den Bogaert (BEL)	+ 0"
5	Cees Haast (NED)	+ 0"
6	Rik Wouters (NED)	+ 0"
7	Alfons Hermans (BEL)	+ 0"
8	Leo Knops (NED)	+ 0"
9	Hugo Hellemans (BEL)	+ 0"
10	Rik Luyten (BEL)	+ 0"
