= Wouter Van Mechelen =

Belgian cyclist

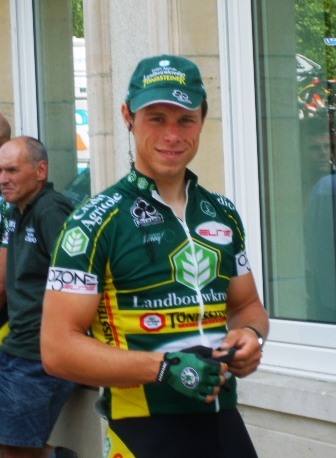
- Van Mechelen in 2007

Personal information
- Full name: Wouter Van Mechelen
- Born: 8 April 1981 (age 45) Antwerp, Belgium

Cycling career
- Sport: Cycling
- Current team: Retired
- Disciplines: Road; Track
- Role: Rider

Professional teams
- 2003–2006: Vlaanderen–T Interim
- 2007–2008: Landbouwkrediet–Tönissteiner
- 2009–2010: Fidea

Wouter Van Mechelen (born 8 April 1981 in Antwerp) is a Belgian former professional road and track cyclist.

== Major results ==
=== Road ===
1999
1st Overall Keizer der Juniores
1st Overall Sint-Martinusprijs Kontich
3rd Time trial, National Junior Road Championships
2000
6th Nationale Sluitingprijs
2001
3rd Internatie Reningelst
4th Nationale Sluitingprijs
2002
1st Grote Prijs Stad Geel
1st Stage 5 Tour du Loir-et-Cher
1st Stage 3 Ronde van Vlaams-Brabant
2nd Dwars door het Hageland
5th Paris–Roubaix Espoirs
2003
1st Stage 8 Circuit des Mines
2004
1st Stage 9 Circuit des Mines
2nd Omloop der Kempe
3rd Grote Prijs Jef Scherens
4th Dwars door Gendringen
5th Ronde van Midden-Zeeland
7th Doha International GP
10th Overall Tour de la Somme

1st Stage 3

2005
2nd Leeuwse Pijl
3rd Vlaamse Havenpijl
4th Grote Prijs Jef Scherens
5th Omloop van de Vlaamse Scheldeboorden
5th Kampioenschap van Vlaanderen
8th Overall Tour of Belgium
2006
1st Leeuwse Pijl
5th Tour de Rijke
6th Paris–Brussels
6th Flèche Hesbigonne
7th Veenendaal–Veenendaal
9th Memorial Rik Van Steenbergen
10th Schaal Sels
2007
8th Beverbeek Classic
2008
3rd Omloop van de Vlaamse Scheldeboorden
3rd Vlaamse Havenpijl
9th Schaal Sels

=== Track ===
1998
National Junior Championships

1st Madison (with Andries Verspeeten)
1st Omnium

1999
National Junior Championships

1st Points race
1st Individual pursuit

2000
1st Omnium, National Championships
2002
3rd Madison, UEC European Under-23 Track Championships
2003
National Championships

1st Madison (with Steven De Neef)
1st Omnium
2nd Points race
3rd Individual pursuit

2004
3rd Six Days of Grenoble (with Iljo Keisse)
