= Bas Giling =

Dutch racing cyclist

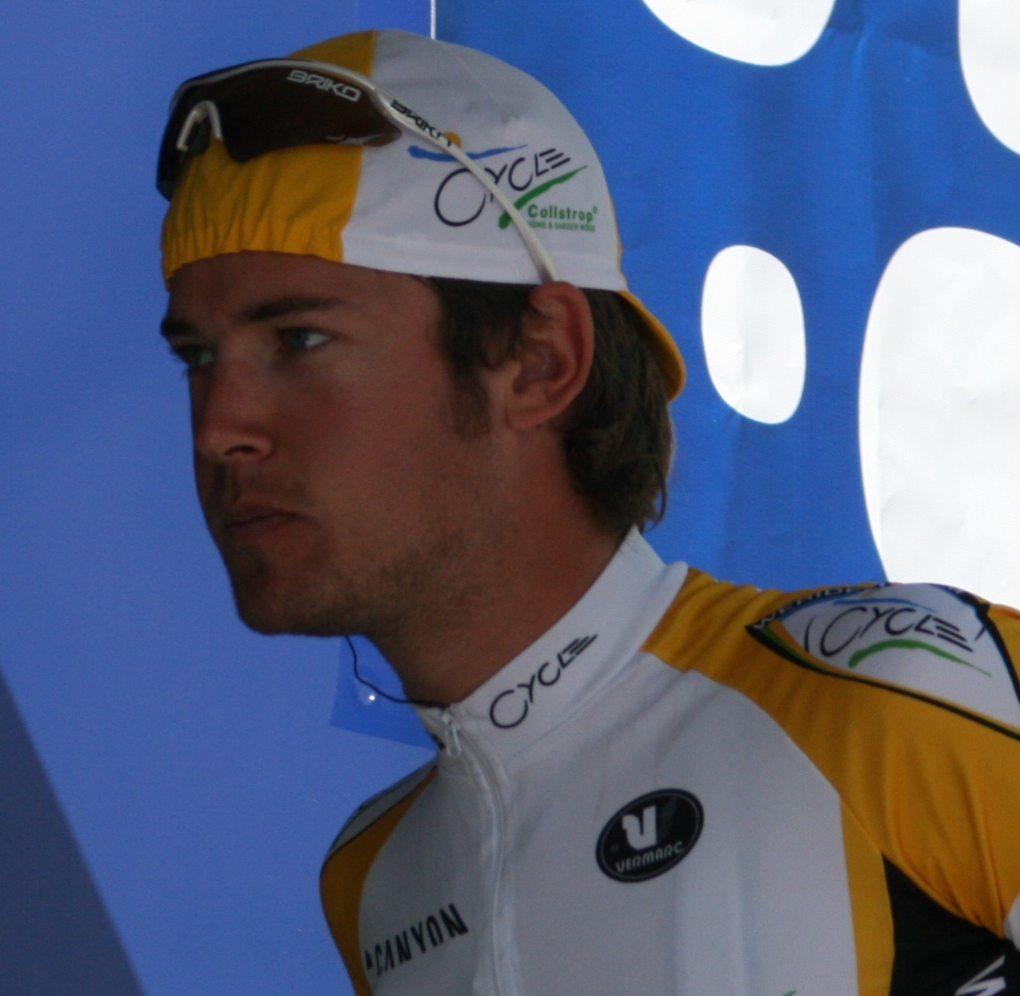

Personal information
- Full name: Bastiaan Giling
- Born: 4 November 1982 (age 43) Alkmaar, the Netherlands

Cycling career
- Sport: Cycling
- Discipline: Road
- Role: Rider

Professional teams
- 2005–2006: T-Mobile Team
- 2007: Wiesenhof–Felt
- 2008: Cycle Collstrop
- 2009: Team Designa Køkken

Bastiaan "Bas" Giling (born 4 November 1982 in Alkmaar, North Holland) is a Dutch former professional road bicycle racer, who rode professionally between 2005 and 2009. He rode in one Grand Tour, the 2006 Vuelta a España, finishing 125th overall.

Giling is the cousin of cyclists Matthé Pronk and Jos Pronk.

== Major results ==
1999
1st Road race, National Junior Road Championships
2000
3rd Road race, National Junior Road Championships
2001
1st Stage 4 Mainfranken-Tour
2003
1st Stage 4 Tour de Liège
2nd Overall Boucles de la Mayenne
3rd Scratch, National Track Championships
2004
1st Road race, National Under-23 Road Championships
1st Prologue Thüringen Rundfahrt der U23
2nd Overall Triptyque des Monts et Châteaux

1st Stage 2b

2nd Paris–Roubaix Espoirs
3rd Eschborn–Frankfurt Under–23
3rd Overall Olympia's Tour
2007
3rd Le Samyn
8th Ronde van het Groene Hart
