= 1965 Paris–Tours =

Race details
- Dates: 10 October 1965
- Stages: 1
- Distance: 247 km (153.5 mi)
- Winning time: 5h 28' 51"

Results
	Winner	Gerben Karstens (NED)
	Second	Gustaaf De Smet (BEL)
	Third	Fernand Deferm (BEL)

The 1965 Paris–Tours was the 59th edition of the Paris–Tours cycle race and was held on 10 October 1965. The race started in Paris and finished in Tours. The race was won by Gerben Karstens.

== General classification ==
Final general classification

Rank	Rider	Time
1	Gerben Karstens (NED)	5h 28' 51"
2	Gustaaf De Smet (BEL)	+ 8"
3	Fernand Deferm (BEL)	+ 8"
4	Guido Reybrouck (BEL)	+ 8"
5	Arthur Decabooter (BEL)	+ 8"
6	André Noyelle (BEL)	+ 8"
7	Jan Janssen (NED)	+ 8"
8	Jan Nolmans (BEL)	+ 8"
9	Jos Huysmans (BEL)	+ 8"
10	Leo van Dongen (NED)	+ 8"
