= Theo van der Leeuw =

Dutch cyclist

Personal information
- Born: 9 April 1949 (age 77) Echt, Netherlands

Cycling career
- Sport: Cycling
- Discipline: Road
- Role: Rider

Professional teams
- 1973: Canada Dry–Gazelle
- 1974–1975: TI–Raleigh

Theo van der Leeuw (born 9 April 1949) is a Dutch former road cyclist. He competed in the 1973 Tour de France, where he finished 70th overall. That same year he participated in the World Road Race Championships, but was unable to finish.

== Major results ==
1972
1st Stage 7 Olympia's Tour
1973
3rd Grote Prijs Jef Scherens
1974
3rd Circuit des Frontières
8th Druivenkoers-Overijse
8th Le Samyn
