= 1964 Grote Prijs Jef Scherens =

Race details
- Dates: 30 April 1964
- Stages: 1
- Distance: 215 km (133.6 mi)
- Winning time: 5h 06' 00"

Results
| | Winner | Norbert Kerckhove (BEL) |
| | Second | André Noyelle (BEL) |
| | Third | Gustaaf Van Vaerenbergh (BEL) |

The 1964 Grote Prijs Jef Scherens was the second edition of the Grote Prijs Jef Scherens cycle race and was held on 30 April 1964. The race started and finished in Leuven. The race was won by Norbert Kerckhove.

== General classification ==
Final general classification

| Rank | Rider | Time |
|---|---|---|
| 1 | Norbert Kerckhove (BEL) | 5h 06' 00" |
| 2 | André Noyelle (BEL) | + 1' 10" |
| 3 | Gustaaf Van Vaerenbergh (BEL) | + 1' 20" |
| 4 | Léon Sebregts (NED) | + 1' 30" |
| 5 | Leon Vandaele (BEL) | + 1' 35" |
| 6 | Jos Dewit (BEL) | + 1' 35" |
| 7 | Walter Muylaert (BEL) | + 1' 35" |
| 8 | Lode Troonbeeckx (BEL) | + 1' 35" |
| 9 | Rik Luyten (BEL) | + 1' 35" |
| 10 | Richard Everaerts (BEL) | + 1' 35" |
