= 2004 Grote Prijs Jef Scherens =

Race details
- Dates: 5 September 2004
- Stages: 1
- Distance: 186 km (115.6 mi)
- Winning time: 4h 20' 32"

Results
	Winner	Allan Johansen (DEN)
	Second	Karsten Kroon (NED)
	Third	Wouter Van Mechelen (BEL)

The 2004 Grote Prijs Jef Scherens was the 38th edition of the Grote Prijs Jef Scherens cycle race and was held on 5 September 2004. The race started and finished in Leuven. The race was won by Allan Johansen.

== General classification ==
Final general classification

Rank	Rider	Time
1	Allan Johansen (DEN)	4h 20' 32"
2	Karsten Kroon (NED)	+ 57"
3	Wouter Van Mechelen (BEL)	+ 57"
4	Remco van der Ven (NED)	+ 58"
5	Gert Steegmans (BEL)	+ 58"
6	Kevin van der Slagmolen (BEL)	+ 58"
7	Ludovic Capelle (BEL)	+ 58"
8	Peter Wuyts (BEL)	+ 58"
9	Steven De Neef (BEL)	+ 58"
10	Pieter Ghyllebert (BEL)	+ 58"
