= Antje Mönning =

German actress

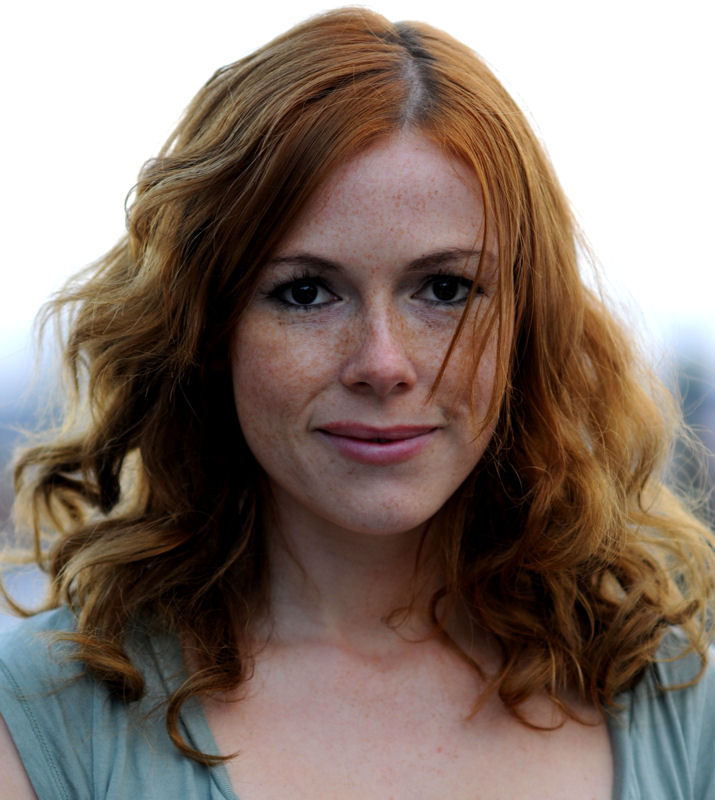
- Born: 2 February 1977 (age 49); Lüdinghausen, North Rhine-Westphalia, West Germany
- Occupation: Actress

Antje Nikola Mönning (born 2 February 1977) is a German actress.

== Career ==
Born in Lüdinghausen, Mönning studied acting from 1999 until 2002 at the Schauspiel München actors' studio. Her first television-role was in the 2003 crime-series Die Wache on RTL. This was followed by a string of other supporting- and leading-roles on German television, most-notably in 2008 and 2009 as a nun in the ARD-series Um Himmels Willen. Apart from her television- and film-work, she also appeared on several German and other European stages and toured the US with a musical. After appearing throughout her career in several short films, she co-produced and played a lead-role in the 2009 film Engel mit schmutzigen Flügeln (lit.: Angel with dirty Wings), directed by Roland Reber. In 2009, Mönning was a jury-member at the Sitges Film Festival in Spain.

Mönning lived together with Roland Reber, his wife, and the actress Marina Anna Eich. Mönning co-produced and played a leading role in Reber's 2012 film Die Wahrheit der Lüge (The Truth of the Lie).

Mönning again collaborated with Reber, co-writing and starring in the 2017 film Der Geschmack von Leben (The Taste of Life). Mönning portrays Nikki, the protagonist.

On 27 April 2023, Mönnings's book "Nicht normal" ist ganz normal was published.

== Filmography ==
- Um Himmels Willen (2008-2009)
- Um Himmels Willen – Weihnachten in Kaltenthal (2008)
- Engel mit schmutzigen Flügeln (2009)
- Die Wahrheit der Lüge (2011)
- Illusion (2013)
- Der Geschmack von Leben (2017)
- Roland Rebers Todesrevue (2019)
