= 1997 Grote Prijs Jef Scherens =

Race details
- Dates: 7 September 1997
- Stages: 1
- Distance: 187 km (116.2 mi)
- Winning time: 4h 09' 00"

Results
	Winner	Stéphane Hennebert (BEL)
	Second	Anthony Rokia (FRA)
	Third	Frank Høj (DEN)

The 1997 Grote Prijs Jef Scherens was the 31st edition of the Grote Prijs Jef Scherens cycle race and was held on 7 September 1997. The race started and finished in Leuven. The race was won by Stéphane Hennebert.

== General classification ==
Final general classification

Rank	Rider	Time
1	Stéphane Hennebert (BEL)	4h 09' 00"
2	Anthony Rokia (FRA)	+ 0"
3	Frank Høj (DEN)	+ 40"
4	Claude Lamour (FRA)	+ 40"
5	Wim Feys (BEL)	+ 40"
6	Christ Hendryckx (BEL)	+ 40"
7	Peter Wuyts (BEL)	+ 48"
8	Grzegorz Rosolinski (POL)	+ 1' 28"
9	Raimondas Rumšas (LTU)	+ 2' 03"
10	Oleg Pankov (UKR)	+ 2' 07"
