= 24/7: The Passion of Life =

2005 film

- Directed by: Roland Reber
- Written by: Roland Reber; Mira Gittner
- Produced by: Patricia Koch; Marina Anna Eich
- Starring: Marina Anna Eich; Mira Gittner; Christoph Baumann
- Cinematography: Mira Gittner; Roland Reber
- Edited by: Mira Gittner
- Music by: Wolfgang Edelmayer
- Release dates: October 2005 (Sitges Film Festival); 19 February 2006 (Germany)
- Running time: 115 minutes
- Country: Germany
- Language: German

24/7: The Passion of Life is a German film directed by Roland Reber. It was released in 2006.

== Plot ==
Eva, a girl from a good family, accidentally meets Magdalena, another young woman; going to visit her at home, he discovers that she leads a double existence as a mistress. The protagonist is fascinated by the sensuality resulting from the BDSM culture.
