= 2002 Grote Prijs Jef Scherens =

Race details
- Dates: 1 September 2002
- Stages: 1
- Distance: 196 km (121.8 mi)
- Winning time: 4h 33' 14"

Results
	Winner	Andreas Klier (GER)
	Second	Robert Hunter (RSA)
	Third	Léon van Bon (NED)

The 2002 Grote Prijs Jef Scherens was the 36th edition of the Grote Prijs Jef Scherens cycle race and was held on 1 September 2002. The race started and finished in Leuven. The race was won by Andreas Klier.

== General classification ==
Final general classification

Rank	Rider	Time
1	Andreas Klier (GER)	4h 33' 14"
2	Robert Hunter (RSA)	+ 2' 03"
3	Léon van Bon (NED)	+ 2' 03"
4	Allan Johansen (DEN)	+ 2' 03"
5	Aart Vierhouten (NED)	+ 2' 14"
6	Bert Scheirlinckx (BEL)	+ 2' 14"
7	Manu L'Hoir (BEL)	+ 2' 14"
8	Serge Baguet (BEL)	+ 2' 25"
9	Gorik Gardeyn (BEL)	+ 2' 33"
10	Matthé Pronk (NED)	+ 2' 33"
