= Stéphane Hennebert =

Personal information
- Born: 2 June 1969 (age 57) Lobbes, Belgium

Cycling career
- Sport: Cycling
- Current team: Retired
- Discipline: Road
- Role: Rider

Amateur team
- 1991: Lotto (stagiaire)

Professional teams
- 1992–1994: Lotto–Mavic–MBK
- 1995: Le Groupement
- 1996: Cédico–Ville de Charleroi
- 1997: Tönissteiner–Colnago
- 1998: Ipso–Euroclean
- 1999–2000: Home Market–Ville de Charleroi

Stéphane Hennebert (born 2 June 1969) is a Belgian former road cyclist. Professional from 1992 to 2000, he most notably won the Grand Prix La Marseillaise in 1995 and the Grote Prijs Jef Scherens in 1997.

== Major results ==
1990
3rd Omloop Het Nieuwsblad U23
1991
1st Omloop Het Nieuwsblad U23
2nd Vlaamse Havenpijl
2nd Ronde van Vlaanderen U23
1992
2nd GP de Fourmies
2nd Grand Prix d'Isbergues
6th Circuit des Frontières
10th Overall Tour of Ireland
10th Paris–Camembert
1993
8th Grand Prix d'Isbergues
8th Grote Prijs Jef Scherens
9th GP du canton d'Argovie
1994
2nd Ronde van Limburg
7th Overall Tour d'Armorique
7th GP de la Ville de Rennes
1995
1st Grand Prix La Marseillaise
7th A Travers le Morbihan
1996
2nd Le Samyn
2nd Grand Prix de la Ville de Lillers
7th Kampioenschap van Vlaanderen
8th Grand Prix Cerami
1997
1st Grote Prijs Jef Scherens
1998
4th De Kustpijl
