= Hof International Film Festival =

German film festival

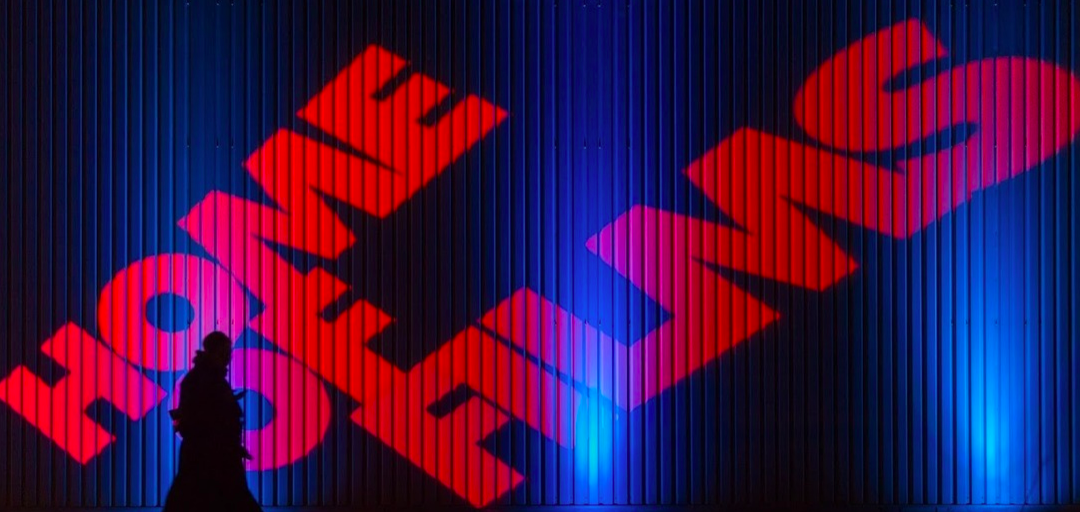
- Genre: Film Festival
- Frequency: Annually
- Location: Hof
- Country: Germany
- Inaugurated: 1967
- Founder: Heinz Badewitz
- Leader: Thorsten Schaumann
- Website: hofer-filmtage.com

The Hof International Filmfestival is a German film festival that takes place in Hof, Bavaria, every year in October. Apart from numerous foreign productions, the main focus traditionally is on German films. During six festival days, about 130 films (80 feature and documentary films as well as 50 short films) are shown in 8 theaters of 2 cinema centers, adding up to a total of 200 individual film presentations. With the exception of the retrospective, all films are German or world premieres.

== History ==
Initiators of the festival were Heinz Badewitz and Uwe Brandner, who were also members of the Hof "New Jazz Group", together with the artist Werner Weinelt, who later on relocated his art gallery to the pub "Galeriehaus" in Hof. Badewitz, festival director until his death in 2016, and Brandner, had moved to Munich in 1963 where they made short films together. However, they had problems to find a cinema for their film presentations in Munich. Without further ado, Badewitz, who was born in Hof and knew the local cinema operators quite well, and Brandner decided to stage their films in the small town in Upper Franconia. Thus, a Hof short film festival came into existence in 1967 with an overall program duration of not more than 2,5 hours.

In 1968, Badewitz was invited to take part in the German competition of the Oberhausen short film festival with his 2nd short film. The scandal surrounding Hellmuth Costard's contribution film "Besonders Wertvoll" ("Especially Worthwhile") was to lead the film makers to Hof, since they had withdrawn their works from the Oberhausen festival in protest – the starting signal for the 2nd Hof International Film Festival in 1968. Initially, the "Hofer Filmtage" were a mere audience-focused festival without any kind of competitions or awards. The festival rapidly developed into the main annual meeting point for the "Jungfilmer", the makers of the New German Cinema. Many upcoming directors present their debut films in Hof and maintain friendly connections with the festival for years. During the 25th anniversary festival in 1991, Wim Wenders shapes the term of "Hof – Home of Films". The motto of the festival originates from Heinz Badewitz himself: "We don't need stars – we create them."

In 1984, the horror movie Nightmare on Elm Street with the film figure Freddy Krueger has its world premiere at the International Hof Film Festival. Apart from that, director George A. Romero presents the world premiere of his horror movie Zombie – Dawn of the Dead at the filmfestival in Northern Bavaria.

During the preparations for the 50th anniversary festival in 2016, Heinz Badewitz passed away completely unexpectedly. The festival, however, took place as usual in the last week of October. It was organized by the festival team and many highly motivated volunteers. Curators of the film program were Linda Söffker, Alfred Holighaus and Thorsten Schaumann.

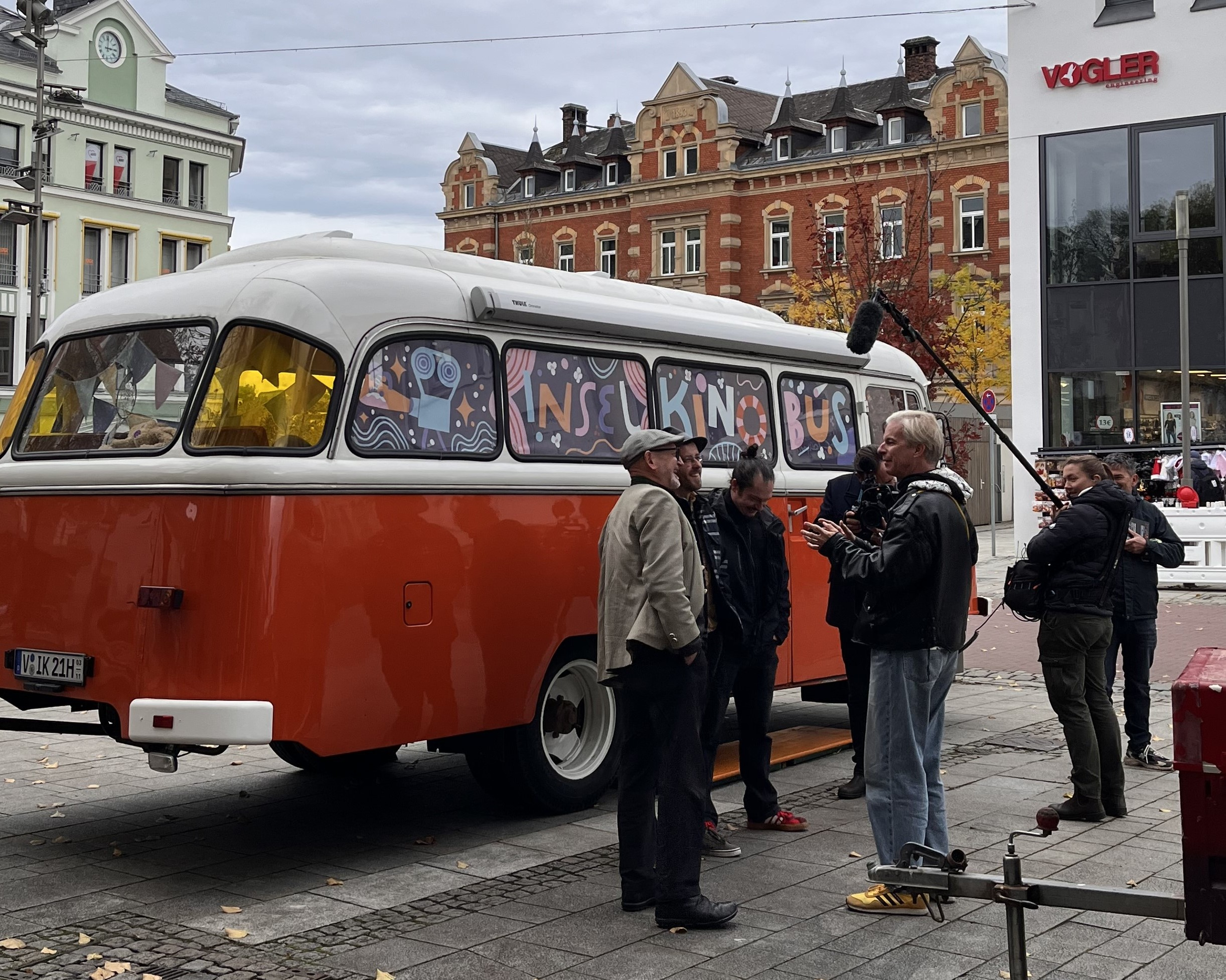
Interwiev with Thorsten Schaumann at the International Film Festival Hof 2025

Since the 51st International Hof Film Festival in 2017, Thorsten Schaumann has been the artistic director of the event. He initiated the format of HoF PLUS that accompanies the festival with panel discussions about current issues of the film business. He also fathered the HoF RENDEZVOUS, a format that features presentations of films from the previous festival throughout the following year.

From 2018-2020, a cooperation with the International Film Festival Karlovy Vary took place presenting the European Film Promotion's Future Frames showcase.

A traditional side event of the festival is the soccer game FC Filmwelt Hof vs. FC Hofer Filmtage that takes place on each year's festival Saturday. Every year a team of actors, directors and producers play against a team of eleven players from the festival organisation and festival supporters.

== Festival 2020 ==
The pandemic situation made it necessary to plan a hybrid festival, so that all films were also available online through the HoF-On-Demand streaming platform, restricted to Germany. With respect to reduced admission capacities, four additional venues were used for theatrical screenings. The hybrid format with streaming of most of the films during the physical edition of the festival and the following week was continued in 2021 and 2022.

== Films ==
The festival covers the almost full spectrum of non-mainstream movies, the main focus being on films of German origin. Especially debut works from German film schools account for a large part of the program. However, the festival provides a showcase for non-domestic productions, too. Movies from all over Europe, the US, Australia and New Zealand, only to mention a few, are being shown. Out of 2,000-2,500 submissions, a selection of about 80 feature and documentary films as well as about 50 short films sum up to a total of about 130 approved program movies. In general, short films are screened together with longer films.

== Festival guests ==
Since the first festival in 1967, many directors and actors have been present at the festival in person, gladly answering questions from the audience or taking part in the many discussion panels around the festival. Many of the film makers and actors have sustainably succeeded in the domestic and international film industry after their first appearance in Hof. These include:

- Maren Ade
- Detlev Buck
- Doris Dörrie
- Atom Egoyan
- Rainer Werner Fassbinder
- Dominik Graf
- Veit Helmer
- Oliver Herbrich
- Werner Herzog
- Peter Jackson
- Jim Jarmusch
- Aki Kaurismäki
- Amos Kollek
- Clara Law
- Mike Leigh
- Dani Levy
- Caroline Link
- Rosa von Praunheim
- Ulrich Seidl
- Tom Tykwer
- Wim Wenders
- Sönke Wortmann
- Daniele Marcheggiani

== Retrospective ==
Every year, a retrospective is dedicated to exceptional movie directors. The festival program features a section of the respective director's lifework. Traditionally, the artist is present at the festival in person, taking part in several discussion panels. Previous retrospectives:

- 1976: Brian De Palma, United States
- 1977: John Cassavetes, United States; George A. Romero, United States
- 1978: Monte Hellman, United States
- 1979: Curtis Harrington, United States
- 1980: David Cronenberg, Canada
- 1981: Roger Corman, United States
- 1982: Vernon Zimmerman, United States
- 1983: Samuel Fuller, United States; John Sayles, United States
- 1984: Paul Cox, Australia; Vincent Ward, New Zealand
- 1985: Michael Dinner, United States; Jack Sholder, United States
- 1986: Lee Grant, United States
- 1987: Robert Frank, United States
- 1988: Terence Davies, United Kingdom; Seijun Suzuki, Japan
- 1989: Henry Jaglom, United States
- 1990: Noburo Tanaka, Japan
- 1991: Atom Egoyan, Canada; André Forcier, Canada
- 1992: Alex Cox, United States
- 1993: Mike Leigh, United Kingdom
- 1994: Tim Burton, United States; Peter Jackson, New Zealand
- 1995: Albert Maysles, Vereinigte Staaten
- 1996: Clara Law, Hong Kong
- 1997: Bill Bennett, Australia
- 1998: Alan Clarke, United Kingdom
- 1999: Donald Cammell, United States
- 2000: Amos Kollek, United States
- 2001: Reflections on Germany
- 2002: Paul Morrissey, United States
- 2003: Ulli Lommel, Germany/United States
- 2004: John McNaughton, United States
- 2005: Constantin Costa-Gavras, France
- 2006: Review 40 years Hof International Film Festival
- 2007: Wayne Wang, United States
- 2008: Allison Anders, United States
- 2009: Lou Castel, Italy
- 2010: Bob Rafelson, United States
- 2011: David Mackenzie, United Kingdom
- 2012: Rosa von Praunheim, Germany
- 2013: Michael Oblowitz, United States
- 2014: Eran Riklis, Israel
- 2015: Chris Petit, United Kingdom
- 2016: 8 Klassiker der vergangenen 50 Jahre Hofer Filmtage
- 2017: Tony Gatlif, France
- 2018: Barbet Schroeder, Franse
- 2019: Samir, Switzerland
- 2020: no retrospective
- 2021: Joachim Król, Germany
- 2022: Roland Reber & Kollektiv, Germany
- 2023: Maria Schrader, Germany
- 2024: Howard Ziehm, United States (posthumously, represented by director Christian Genzel)

== Festival awards ==
- Förderpreis Neues Deutsches Kino - Advancement Award New German Cinema

The Förderpreis Neues Deutsches Kino is a chance for young filmmakers. The award is endowed with 10,000 € and donated by Bavaria Film, the Bayerischer Rundfunk (Bavarian Broadcasting Corporation) and the DZ Bank. Among all those German movies that have their international premiere at the festival, the "Best Film" will be awarded. An independent jury decide upon the award-winning film.

- Filmpreis der Stadt Hof - Film Award of the City Hof

This prize has been awarded since 1986. It is actually a piece of art sculpture consisting of previous years' festival program catalogue pages. As a matter of fact, the winner is rewarded with artistically redesigned movie contents. It was created by Christina Mosif and Konrad Grässler in the frameworks of a project launched by the vocational school for product design in Selb, Bavaria. The award is dedicated to persons deeply connected with the town of Hof and the film festival itself. The winners are usually not represented with a film at the current festival.

- Hofer Goldpreis - Hof Gold Award

The prize is donated by the Friedrich-Baur-Stiftung and awarded by the Bayerische Akademie der Schönen Künste in memoriam Heinz Badewitz. It replaces the Heinz Badewitz Award of 2016 and 2017. It is awarded for the best directing performance in a debut feature film. Every year, the academy assigns another tutor from their film and media art department who will decide upon the award winner. The prize itself is a certified 1 kg gold bar at a current value of about 35,000 €. Moreover, the award winner benefits from artistic advice with creating a new movie for the duration of one year. Every director whose feature film has its premiere at the festival automatically participates in the competition. In 2018, director Edgar Reitz was the awarding tutor. In 2019, director Bernhard Sinkel had the honor to decide upon and announce the award winner.

- VGF Young Producers Award

Since 1994, the "Verwertungsgesellschaft für Nutzungsrechte an Filmwerken mbH (VGF) " has awarded the prize to the best movie of a young producer. An independent board of jurors evaluate all submitted German feature films with regard to overall quality as well as audience attractiveness. With 65,000 €, the prize is the highest endowed young producers award in Germany. The prize money is not for a specific purpose. It is meant to strengthen the equity capital ratio of young production companies.

- Hans Vogt Movie Award

With this award, the small town of Rehau commemorates the pioneering achievement of Hans Vogt, who was born and grew up in the Rehau suburb of town Wurlitz. As an engineer, Hans Vogt was decisively involved in the invention of the sound film. Since 2013, the prize has been awarded to filmmakers who are innovatively and thoroughly concerned about their movie's overall sound performance. It is endowed with €5,000.

- Granite Award - (Hofer Dokumentarfilmpreis)

The local Hermann und Bertl Müller Stiftung has rewarded the best German long documentary film with a prize money of 7,500 € since 2015.

- Bild-Kunst Advancement Award

The award was suggested in 1997 by the "Course of Studies Film And Television / Department Production Design" of the Munich Film And Television Academy. It rewards the best production design and the best costume design of a feature film and is endowed with 2,500 €.

== Awards no longer awarded ==
- German Film Promotion Prize

The Förderpreis Deutscher Film, sponsored by HypoVereinsbank, Bavaria Film and Bayerisches Fernsehen, was awarded as a prize for young talents from 2005 to 2011. The prize was awarded for an outstanding artistic achievement in a German film that was screened in the programme of the Hof International Film Festival. The prize was replaced by the Förderpreis Neues Deutsches Kino in 2012.

- Eastman Award for Young Talent

The "Eastman Award for Young Talent", donated by Kodak GmbH, was awarded from 1984 to 2012 and honoured one young director and his or her film. The prize was endowed with raw film material and was intended to help with the director's next production.

== Quotes ==
Hof is when beer bottles are plopping as soon as the lights go out in the cinema auditorium. Hof is when the festival director is moderating a discussion panel in his Snoopy jumper and the premiere audience are partying at the bratwurst stand. Hof is when a short film is shown prior to every feature film and the directors are staging a four-man backfield defence at the soccer game in the urban park. In the first place, however, Hof is famous for having provided a showcase for non-mainstream German movies for more than 50 years, strictly as part of the main program and not as we know it from the Munich or the Berlinale festival as separate formats.

— Bernhard Blöchl, Süddeutsche Zeitung

Hof still is the showcase of the German movie. Behind Berlin, but ahead of Munich.

— Hanns-Georg Rodek, Berliner Morgenpost

Even as an established festival, Hof hasn't lost its provincial yet cosmopolitan appeal. Nowhere else there is a wider range than in Hof.

— Wilfried Geldner, Augsburger Allgemeine

Hof has been and still is the festival of a radical 68er and his allies who have done more for the German movie than the Berlinale, the Munich, Oberhausen and Mannheim festivals all together.

— Christoph Schlingensief, Regisseur
