= Olaf Jentzsch =

German cyclist (born 1958)

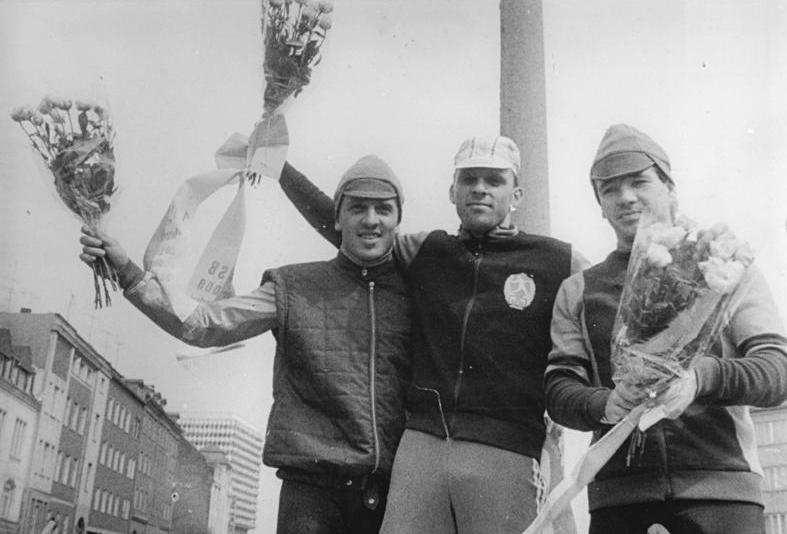
- Olaf Jentzsch (left)

Personal information
- Born: 3 December 1958 (age 67) Riesa, East Germany

Cycling career
- Sport: Cycling
- Role: Rider

Professional team
- 1990-1992: Tulip Computers-KOGA

Olaf Jentzsch (born 3 December 1958 in Riesa) is a German former racing cyclist. As a professional rider of team Tulip Computers-KOGA, he rode in the 1992 Tour de France and the 1992 Giro d'Italia. As a citizen of East Germany he was only allowed to ride amateur races before 1990. Jentzsch managed to win a whole series of amateur stage races and stages, of which only a selection is shown below.

== Major results ==
1981

- GDR champion on the road

1983

- Overall Vuelta a Cuba
- Stage 5a Coors Classic

1984

- GDR champion on the road

1985

- Overall Tour of Austria
- Stage 5 Coors Classic

1986

- GDR champion individual time trial on the road

1987

- Overall and stage 6 Tour of Greece
- Overall Tour of Yugoslavia

1988

- Overall Tour du Loir-et-Cher

1989

- Stage 9 Clásico RCN

1990

- Stage 1 Giro del Trentino
