= Johan Verstrepen =

Belgian cyclist

Personal information
- Born: 21 October 1967 (age 58) Herentals, Belgium

Cycling career
- Sport: Cycling
- Current team: Retired
- Discipline: Road
- Role: Rider

Professional teams
- 1990–1991: Histor–Sigma
- 1992: GB–MG Maglificio
- 1993–1994: Collstrop-Assur Carpets
- 1995–1998: Vlaanderen 2002–Eddy Merckx
- 1999–2002: Lampre–Daikin
- 2003–2006: Landbouwkrediet–Colnago

Johan Verstrepen (born 21 October 1967 in Herentals) is a Belgian former racing cyclist.

== Palmares ==
1989
1st Overall Tour du Hainaut Occidental

1st Stage 1b

1st Stage 3 Circuit Franco Belge
1999
1st Stage 3 Étoile de Bessèges
