= Antje Paarlberg =

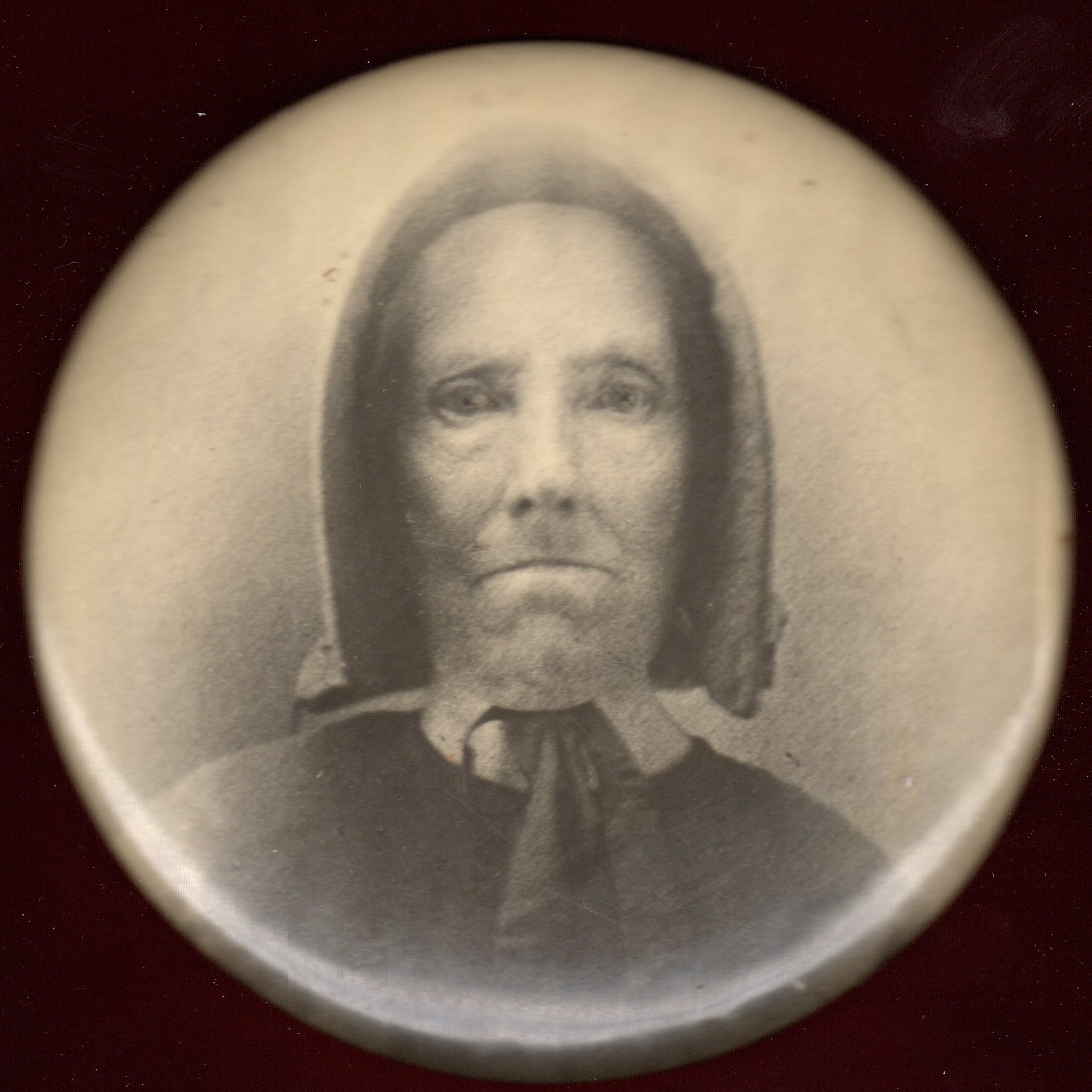
- circa 1870
- Born: Antje Waagmeester; February 16, 1808; Warmenhuizen, Netherlands
- Died: October 28, 1885 (aged 77); South Holland, Illinois, US
- Spouse: Klaas Paarlberg
- Children: 7

Antje Paarlberg née Waagmeester (16 February 1808 – 28 October 1885) is known as the inspiration for the novel So Big, which won the Pulitzer Prize. Chicago area author Edna Ferber used South Holland, Illinois, a Chicago suburb, and its pioneers and onion farms as background for her 1924 novel about an ambitious widow in a Midwestern Dutch American farming community. The resilience of Antje Wagemeester Paarlberg, a widowed immigrant and determined pioneer, was allegedly the inspiration for the main character Selina Peake DeJong.

On 26 April 1835, Antje Waagmeester married Klaas Paarlberg in their birthplace of Warmenhuizen and settled as farmers in nearby Spanbroek where they would have eight children. In 1847 Klaas and Antje and their seven surviving children set off on a voyage from the Netherlands to America in search of better fortunes on the ship Doggersbank. They felt that the State Church was too liberal and the taxes unfair. The taxes in the Netherlands were high; there was blight in the potato crop, and disease among the cattle. The couple heard about wonderful opportunities in America. They left North Holland, a province of the Netherlands with their seven children, the oldest being seven years old and the youngest three months old.

Klaas died of pleurisy during the voyage and was buried at sea. He was 43 years old at the time of his death. Antje Paarlberg continued to America with their children with this single thought in mind, De Heere zal wel zorgen or "the Lord will provide".

The ship's captain offered to take Antje Paarlberg and her children back to the Netherlands but she refused to go. The determined 'Widow Paarlberg', as she is referred to in South Holland, persevered even after the youngest child also died. The baby was buried in a small cemetery near Lincoln Park. Antje and her remaining six children settled near other Dutch pioneers 20–30 miles south of Chicago, buying eighty acres of land at seven dollars an acre by Thorn Creek. There she built a log cabin plastered with clay near what would become the village of South Holland, Illinois. Eventually all of her children acquired land in the area and developed farms. Antje Paarlberg died of a stroke in October 1885 at the age of 77.

Ferber highly fictionalized Antje's life and the Paarlberg family believes that she is somewhat misrepresented in So Big. South Holland's Dutch descendants take exception to the literary license Ferber took with the character of the widow, creating a pushy flirtatious personality that South Hollanders say was nothing like the real Widow Paarlberg. Ferber gives a nod to the real Antje Paarlberg who appears in the novel as the "Widow Parlenberg". Ferber's So Big won the Pulitzer Prize and is considered among her most popular works. The book Lest We Forget by Henry Paarlberg, one of Klass's and Antje's grandchildren, tells the family's version of the Paarlberg family's difficult journey.

== Paarlberg Historical Farm and Museum ==
Peter Paarlberg, Antje's oldest son, built the frame house on the Paarlberg farm that can be visited today in South Holland. The Paarlberg Historical Farm and Museum are nestled along Thorn Creek at the west end of a 16 acre park in the southeast corner of town on Paxton Avenue near 172nd Place. This park is host to the Annual Paarlberg Heritage Festival held on Labor Day. Tours of the original farm house, buggy barn, storage barn and the grounds are presented by the South Holland Historical Society members throughout the day.

Peter married Cornelia Van Oostenbrugge on October 31, 1870. They had eleven children together. Peter died on August 10, 1921, and Cornelia died on December 29, 1927. Peter's descendants donated the original Paarlberg homestead to the South Holland Historical Society in 1970.

A branch of the Peter Paarlberg family continues to farm in Kankakee County, 30 miles south of the original homestead which is today surrounded by suburbia. A second branch of the family farms in LaPorte County, Indiana.
