= Antje Vowinckel =

- Born: December 14, 1964; Hagen, West Germany
- Occupations: Sound artist, radio artist, musician
- Years active: 1994-active
- Awards: see list
- Website: Official website

Antje Vowinckel (born December 14, 1964)is a Berlin-based German sound artist, radio artist, and musician.

== Early life ==
Vowinckel was born in Hagen. She had flute, guitar, and piano lessons as a child, later playing the flute in a student orchestra and keyboards in a blues band. After completing her studies in literature, music, and sociology, she held a radio editorial internship and worked for one year as a radio play producer for the Südwestrundfunk (SWR) in Baden-Baden, Germany.

== Career ==
The focus of Vowinckel's work is on the musicality of the spoken word—for example, with the melodies in dialects and endangered languages, and with streams of automatic speaking, a playful method of continuous and instantaneous verbal reactions to an environment. In recent years, she has also created sound performances, such as Organ and Objects for electric organ and amplified objects, and live performances for automatic speaking. Since 2000, Vowinckel has been living in Berlin. She works as a freelance director, author, composer, and performer, moving increasingly from text to music. Her works have been broadcast on numerous public radio stations, such as Südwestrundfunk (SWR), Westdeutscher Rundfunk (WDR), Bayerischer Rundfunk (BR), Hessischer Rundfunk (HR), Norddeutscher Rundfunk (NDR), Saarländischer Rundfunk (SR), Schweizer Radio (DRS), Österreichischer Rundfunk (ORF), Radio France, Radio Nacional de España (RNE), 702 ABC Sydney, and Yleisradio (Finland). Her works have also been presented at numerous festivals, including the Donaueschinger Musiktage, Prix Italia, Biennale Bonn, Klangwerkstatt Berlin, and Festival Musica Contemporanea Alicante. Her piece "Call Me Yesterday" has been broadcast and presented in 16 countries.

== Works ==
- 2009: Lohnarbeit und Liebesleid - radio play,

== Awards ==
- 2000: Prix Europa for Daily Soap
- 2011: ZKM Prize "Ferrari recouté" for Ferrari entre
