= Fernand Deferm =

Personal information
- Born: 29 October 1940 (age 85) Lummen, Belgium

Cycling career
- Sport: Cycling
- Current team: Retired
- Discipline: Road
- Role: Rider

Professional teams
- 1963–1964: Solo–Terrot
- 1965–1967: Dr. Mann
- 1968: Okay Whisky–Diamant–Simons

Fernand Deferm (born 29 October 1940) is a Belgian former professional road cyclist. He most notably won the 1965 Grote Prijs Jef Scherens, outsprinting Eddy Merckx.

== Major results ==
1965
1st Grote Prijs Jef Scherens
3rd Paris–Tours
4th Overall Ronde van Nederland
5th Kampioenschap van Vlaanderen
5th Ronde van Limburg
1966
1st Ronde van Limburg
1967
3rd Ronde van Limburg
6th Kampioenschap van Vlaanderen
8th Schaal Sels
