= Frau Antje =

Character in advertisement of cheese

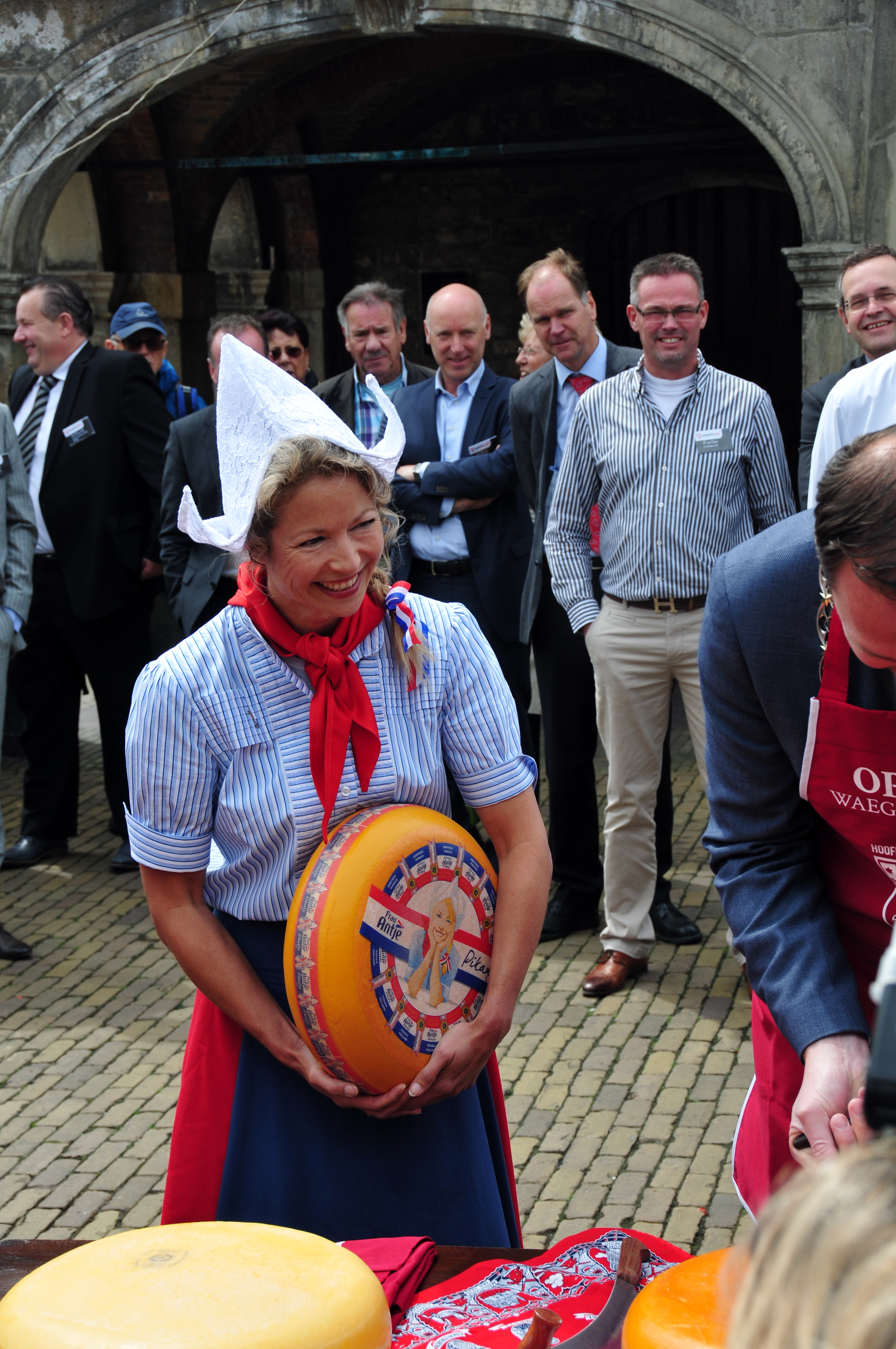
Frau Antje in Gouda.

Frau Antje is a Dutch character used in the advertising of cheese (and other dairy products). "Frau" is German for "Ms.", and "Antje" is a first name that is as acceptable in German as it is in Dutch: the character was created specifically for the advertising the export of Dutch cheese to Germany.

Frau Antje was born during the 1959 edition of the Berlin International Green Week, a trade fair for agriculture and nutrition. Apparently, a young Dutch woman from The Hague named Antje was working the booth of the Dutch Dairy Organization (NZB), serving cheese; when she fell ill and her colleagues kept being asked "where Frau Antje was", the chief of the NZB decided there was commercial potential in the idea. He hired Kitty Janssen to be the first Frau Antje (1961), dressed in a supposedly traditional Dutch costume and wearing wooden shoes.

Frau Antje's costume, which was designed specifically for her, does not represent any specific traditional Dutch costume, though the "wings" on the headdress are reminiscent of the traditional costume of Volendam: since Volendam is a well-known tourist destination, it can be said to represent "Dutchness" pars pro toto. The name Antje was chosen (or retained) since it appears to Germans as a typically Dutch name, and is indeed common in the three northernmost Dutch provinces.

== Frau Antje's image ==
Early in her career, Frau Antje resembled an exemplary housewife or even a home economics teacher. From an authoritative position she addressed herself to housewives, and the world portrayed in those advertisements was typical of the post-World War II period, whose values were cleanness, sobriety, propriety, with the family at the center. In the mid-1960s she became a more coquettish figure, even enticing the viewer into her bedroom (while she's holding a cheese, of course). Of more importance in the ads of the 1970s and 1980s was the stereotypical portrayal of the Dutch landscape, with green meadows, blue canals, and black and white cows; it is in this landscape that Antje presents the viewer with a table full of cheese. Antje returns to the kitchen in the mid-1980s, but this time, unlike in the 1960s, she is an emancipated, private person, no longer a traditional teacher, in an attempt to appeal to a more fragmented audience living a multitude of lifestyles. In the second half of the 1990s, Antje, now an independent and self-assured cheese expert, was even more emancipated, and while still dressed in her traditional garb she dances to techno music. Finally, after 2003, she is turned into a kind of fairy character, and rather than work in her own (Dutch) environment, she is inserted into German household situations where she advises families in their hypermodern kitchens, emphasizing the chronological distance between those interiors and her own old-fashioned clothing.

== Frau Antjes ==
- Kitty Janssen (1961–1963)
- Emilie Bouwman (1963–1973)
- Ellen Soeters (1973–1984)
- Emilie Bouwman (1984–late 1980s)
- Saskia Valencia (late 1980s–1998)
- Madeleen Driessen (1999–2011)
- Mendy Smits (2011–2014)
- Floor Schothorst (2014–2018)
- Nyncke Bergman (2018–2025)
- Annemarijn Kool (2018–2021, 2025–present)
