= Jos Pronk =

Dutch racing cyclist

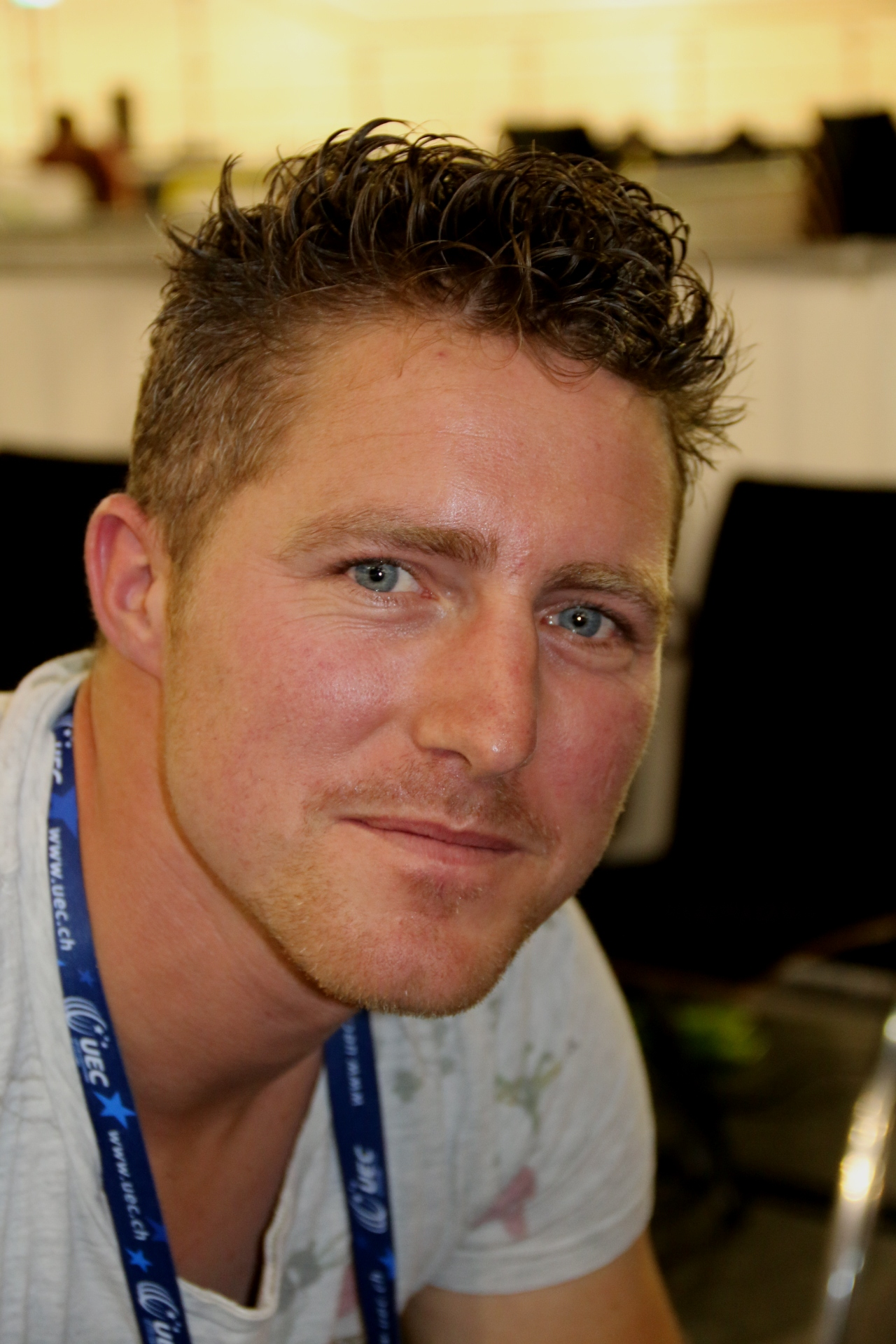
- Jos Pronk (2017)

Personal information
- Full name: Jos Pronk
- Born: 13 January 1983 (age 43) Warmenhuizen, Netherlands

Cycling career
- Sport: Cycling
- Current team: Retired
- Disciplines: Road, track
- Role: Rider

Professional teams
- 2004–2007: Van Hemert–Eurogifts
- 2008–2009: KrolStonE Continental Team
Medal record
Representing the Netherlands
Men's track cycling
World Championships
| Bronze medal – third place | 2003 Stuttgart | Points race |

Jos Pronk (born 13 January 1983 in Warmenhuizen, North Holland) is a Dutch former professional racing cyclist.

He grew up in a family of cyclists: Mattheus Pronk was his father, Matthé Pronk is his brother and Bas Giling is his cousin.

== Major results ==
2002
1st Scratch, UEC European Under-23 Track Championships
2003
1st Madison, National Track Championships (with Matthé Pronk)
3rd Points race, UCI Track World Championships
3rd Road race, National Under-23 Road Championships
2005
1st ZLM Tour
1st Gent–Staden
5th Overall Olympia's Tour

1st Stage 5 (ITT)

9th Grand Prix de la Ville de Lillers
2006
1st Derny, National Track Championships
1st Grand Prix de la Ville de Nogent-sur-Oise
2nd Ronde van Midden-Nederland
2007
1st Stage 3 Olympia's Tour
1st Stage 2 Tour de Bretagne
5th Time trial, National Road Championships
8th Ronde van Drenthe
2008
3rd Overall Tour du Loir-et-Cher

1st Stages 1 & 5

3rd Duo Normand
4th Ronde van Noord-Holland
5th Road race, National Road Championships
6th Overall Olympia's Tour

1st Stage 5

2009
8th Omloop van het Waasland
2011
1st Omloop der Kempen
