= Wilco Zuijderwijk =

Dutch track cyclist

Personal information
- Full name: Wilhelmus Gerardus Zuijderwijk
- Born: 2 October 1969 Den Helder, Netherlands
- Height: 191 cm (6 ft 3 in)
- Weight: 90 kg (198 lb)

Cycling career
- Sport: Cycling
- Current team: Retired
- Disciplines: Road; Track

Amateur teams
- 1988–1990: Koga Miyata
- 1998–2002: Van Vliet–Weba

Professional teams
- 1991–1993: Buckler–Colnago–Decca
- 2003–2005: Van Vliet–EBH Advocaten–Gazelle

Wilhelmus Gerardus "Wilco" Zuijderwijk (born 2 October 1969 in Den Helder) is a Dutch former road and track cyclist. He competed in the Men's points race and Men's team pursuit at the 2000 Summer Olympics, finishing 18th and 7th.

== Major results ==
=== Road ===
1990
1st Overall Olympia's Tour

1st Stage 2

1st Stages 1 & 6b Niedersachsen-Rundfahrt
1991
1st Grote Prijs Jef Scherens
1st Omloop Mandel-Leie-Schelde
1st Grand Prix de la Libération (TTT)
3rd Druivenkoers-Overijse
4th GP Stad Zottegem
6th GP Rik Van Steenbergen
9th Grand Prix de Cannes
1994
1st Romsée-Stavelot-Romsée
1996
1st Overall OZ Wielerweekend
1st Prologue & Stage 11 Olympia's Tour
1997
1st Stage 2 (ITT) OZ Wielerweekend
2nd Omloop der Kempen
3rd Grand Prix Ost Fenster
5th Overall Olympia's Tour

1st Prologue

1998
3rd Time trial, National Championships
3rd Overall OZ Wielerweekend
4th Overall Olympia's Tour
5th Ronde van Overijssel
1999
4th Overall Olympia's Tour
2000
1st Dorpenomloop Rucphen
1st Stage 4 Niedersachsen-Rundfahrt
5th Overall Olympia's Tour

1st Stage 5

6th ZLM Tour
2001
5th Ronde van Noord-Holland
2004
3rd Tour de Rijke
7th Schaal Sels

=== Track ===
1996
1st Madison (with Marcel van der Vliet), National Championships
1999
National Championships

1st Individual pursuit
1st Points race

2000
UCI World Cup Classics

2nd Points race, Mexico
2nd Team pursuit, Mexico

2002
1st Points race, National Championships
3rd Team pursuit, Monterrey, UCI World Cup Classics

== See also ==
- List of Dutch Olympic cyclists
