= Warmenhuizen =

- Village
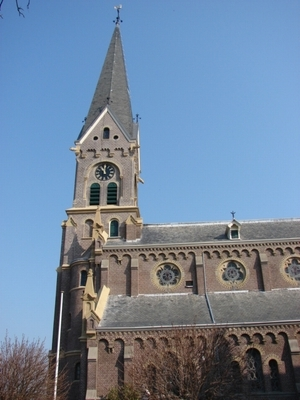
- Catholic church in Warmenhuizen

- Location in the Netherlands Location in the province of North Holland in the Netherlands
- Coordinates: 52°43′21″N 4°44′23″E
- Country: Netherlands
- Province: North Holland
- Municipality: Schagen

Area
  - Village: 14.94 km^{2} (5.77 sq mi)
- Elevation: 0.0 m (0 ft)

Population (2025)
  - Village: 6,080
  - Density: 407/km^{2} (1,050/sq mi)
  - Urban: 5,700
  - Rural: 385
- Time zone: UTC+1 (CET)
  - Summer (DST): UTC+2 (CEST)
- Postal code: 1749
- Dialing code: 0226

Warmenhuizen (West Frisian: Wermehúze) is a town in the Dutch province of North Holland. It is a part of the municipality of Schagen, and lies about 8 km northwest of Heerhugowaard. An agricultural community. The area surrounding the town produces mainly dairy products, cabbage/potatoes, and hot house flowers. Mainly a Roman Catholic community featuring two churches, an old Protestant one, fallen into disuse, built in 16th century and a more modern Roman Catholic church constructed in the early 20th century.

Warmenhuizen was a separate municipality until 1990, when it was merged with Harenkarspel. Harenkarspel merged with Schagen in 2013.

== Notable people born in Warmenhuizen ==
- Antje Paarlberg (1808-1885)
- Joop Klant (1915-1994)
- Jos Pronk (1983)
- Steven Rooks, cyclist

== Gallery ==
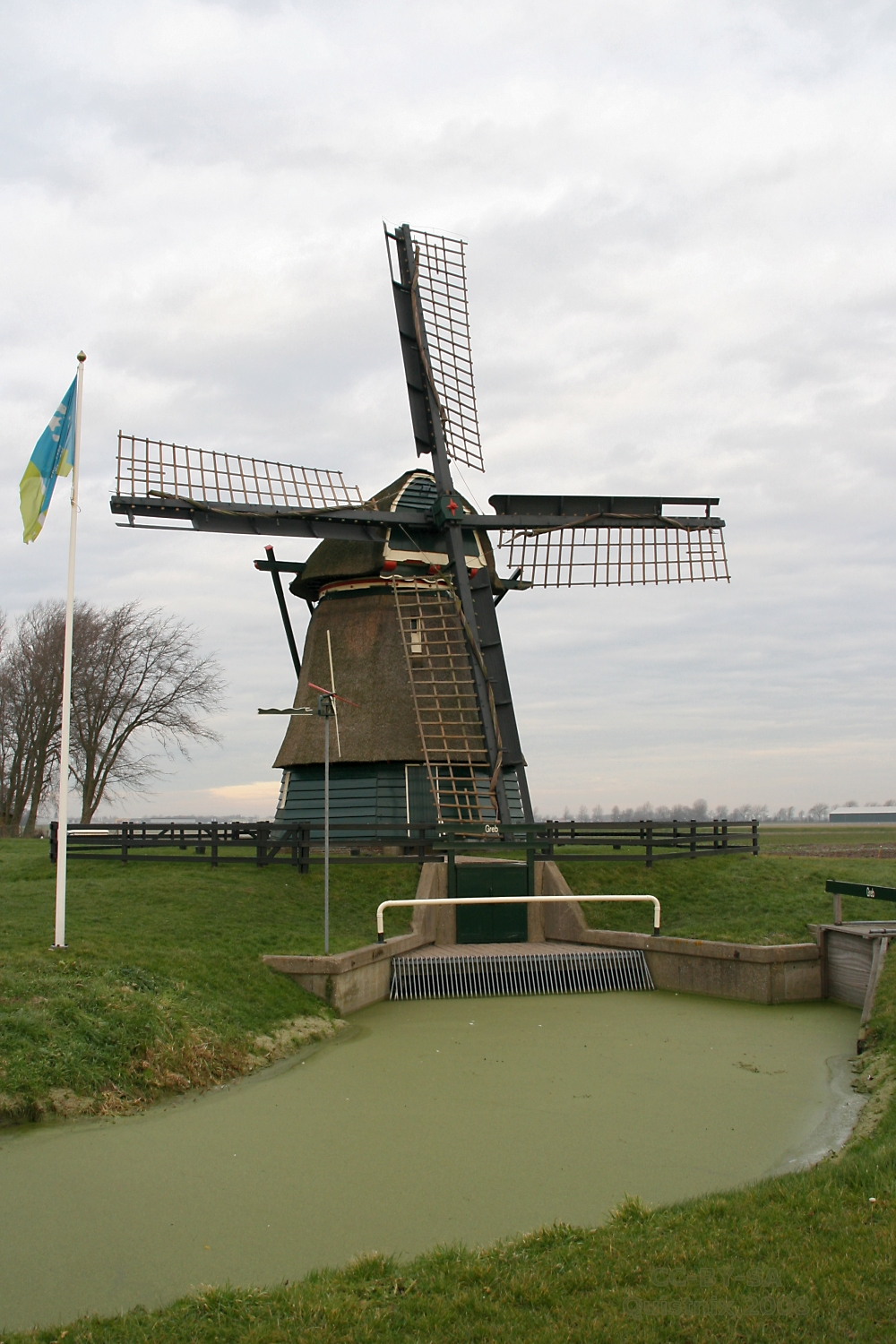
Windmill Grebmolen

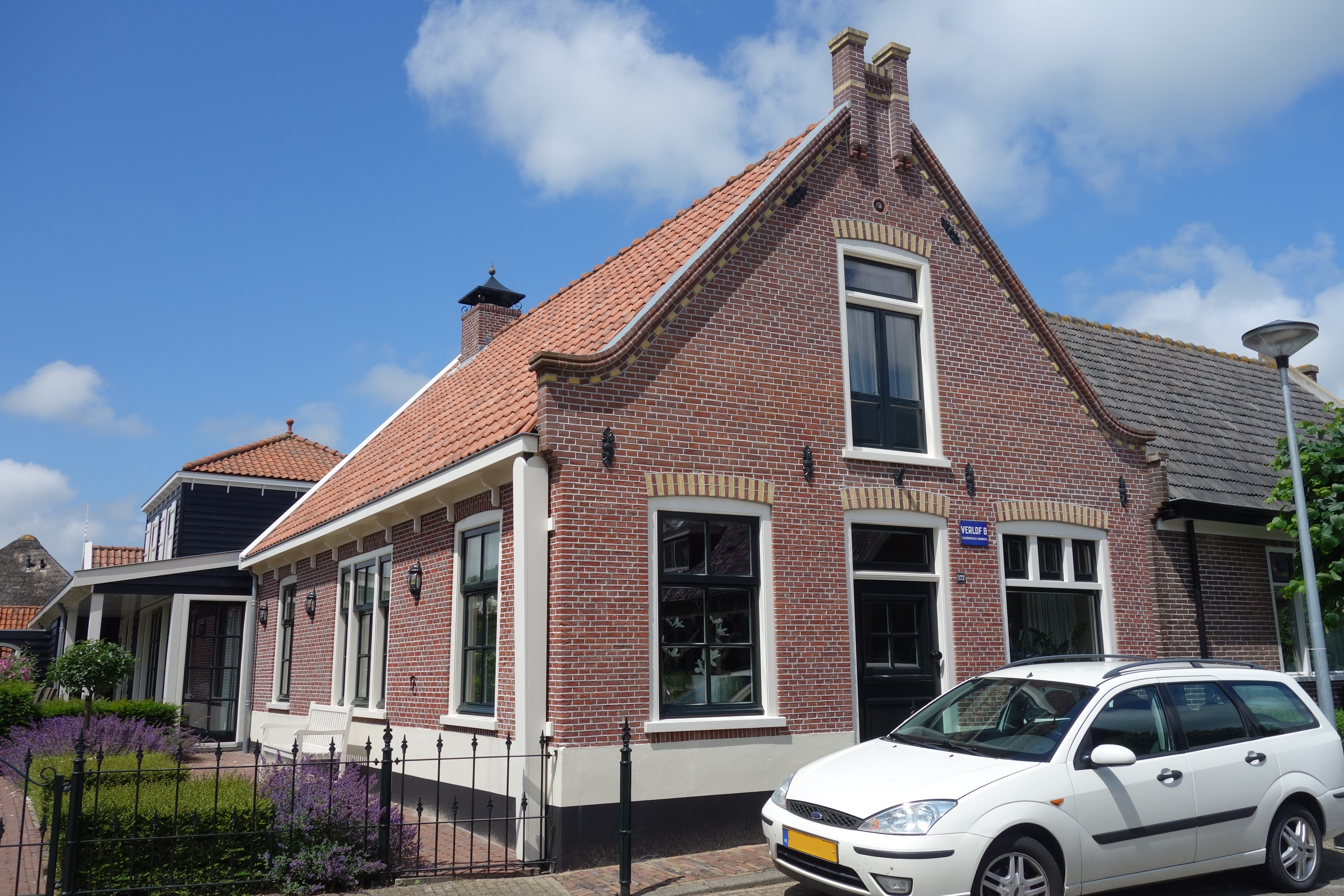
House in Warmenhuizen

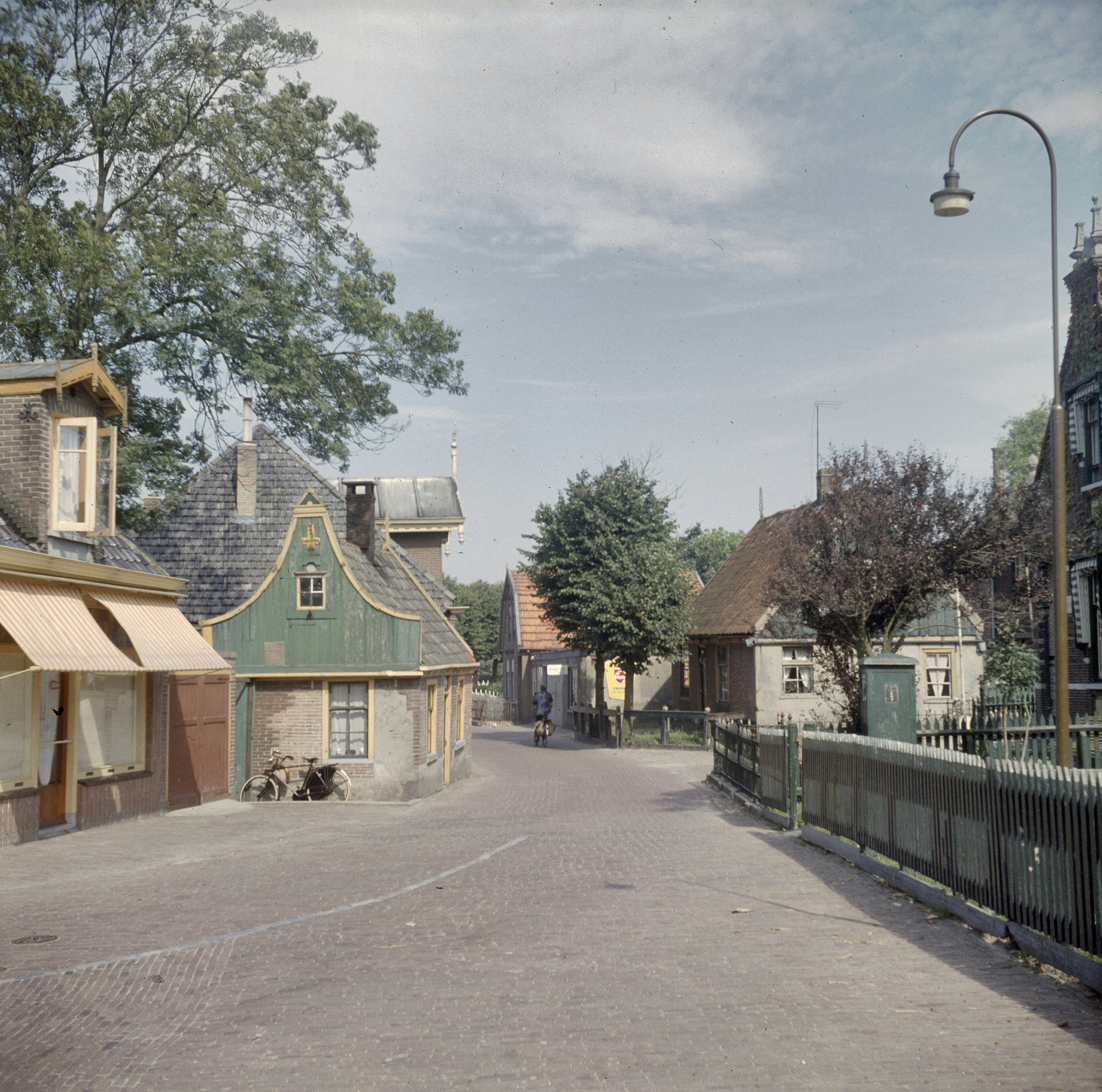
Street view

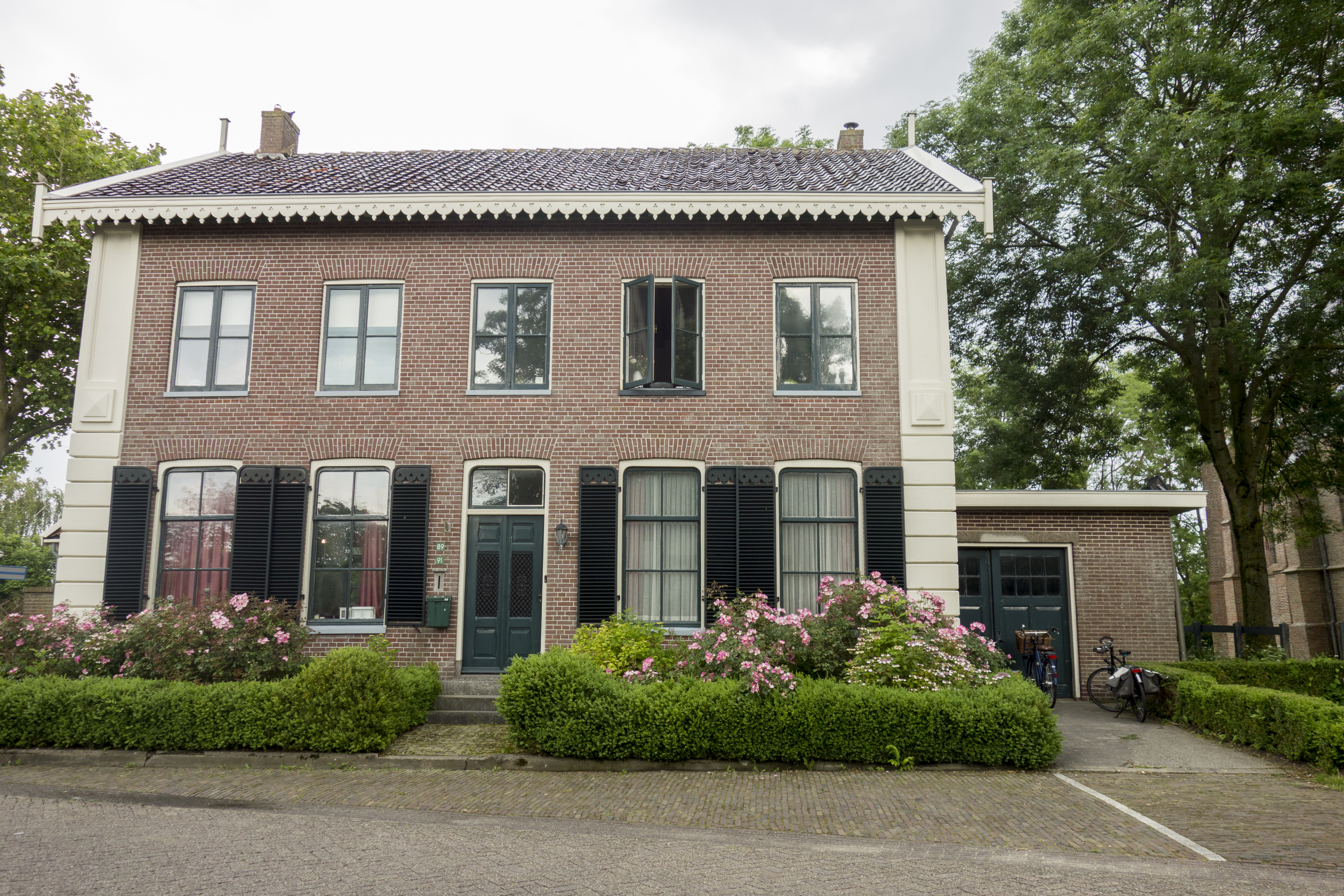
House in Warmenhuizen
