= Roland Reber =

German director, author, and producer (1954–2022)

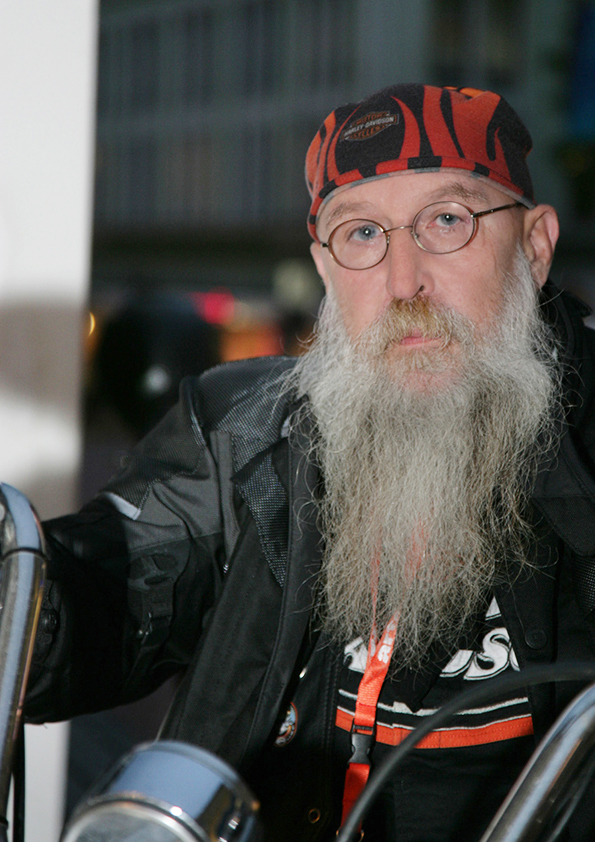
- Reber in 2011
- Born: 11 August 1954; Ludwigshafen, Rhineland-Palatinate, West Germany
- Died: 11 September 2022 (aged 68)
- Occupations: Author, director, producer

Roland Reber (11 August 1954 – 11 September 2022) was a German director, author and producer.

== Biography ==
After finishing his studies at the Schauspielschule Bochum, Germany, in the 1970s, Reber worked as actor, writer and director at many German and international theatres such as Bochum, Essen, Zürich, Düsseldorf, Hamburg, Kingston, Jamaica, Moscow etc. He has written more than 20 theatre plays and scripts as well as texts and poems. In 1981 he founded the Theatre Institute and worked as a director, author and actor. He was Head of the World Theatre Project (in the framework of the Decade for Cultural Development of the UNESCO and UN) which he founded in 1989 and worked as director and writer in Cairo, Mexico and the Caribbean. He was teacher of acting and directing among others in Moscow and the Caribbean.

For wtp international he worked as director, writer and producer. All his films have been shown in various international Film Festivals and have been distributed theatrically and on DVD.

From 2003 until 2007 Reber was the official representative of the CIFF Cairo International Film Festival (A-Festival) for the German speaking countries and the official representative for Europe of the Damascus International Film Festival. He was member of the jury at the Fantasporto International Film Festival 2008 in Portugal, at the Festival Internacional de cinema de Catalunya 2007 in Spain, at the Alexandria International Film Festival in Egypt 2003, the Dhaka International Film Festival in Bangladesh 2004 and at the 13th Cairo International Film Festival for Children 2003.

Three of his films were shown in a "Roland Reber Films" section at the Kolkata International Film Festival in November 2003. In November 2009 six of his feature films have been shown as a Roland Reber Tribute at the renowned 40th International Film Festival of India in Goa, India.

== Distinction/Awards ==
- 1976 Schweizer Kulturpreis
- 1991 and 1993 Cultural prize of the Caribbean Season of Excellence
- 2000 President's Award, Ajijic International Film Festival, Mexico
- 2001 Emerging Filmmaker Award, Hollywood Angel City Film Festival, Los Angeles
- 2001 Jury Choice for Foreign Film, AngelCity Film Festival, Chicago
- 2001 Best Film, Third Panorama of International Film in Thessaloniki, Greece
- Since 1996 in the German Who's Who

== Filmography ==
- 2011 The truth of lie (psychodrama)
- 2009 Angels with dirty wings (erotic-drama)
- 2007 My Dream or Loneliness never walks alone (dramedy)
- 2005 24/7 The Passion of Life (erotic-drama)
- 2004 The Dark Side of our inner Space (tragedy)
- 2003 Pentamagica (comedy)
- 2002 Are girls werewolves...? (short)
- 2001 Das Zimmer (psycho-thriller)
- 2000 Compulsion (short)
- 1999 The Bag (short)
- 1998 Manuel (short)
- 1998 On Television (short)
- 1979 Ihr habt meine Seele gebogen wie einen schoenen Taenzer (drama)

== Press comments ==
- Roland Reber: An Institution in directing. To say that Roland Reber is an exceptional director would be describing him half-heartedly. For the man is himself a lesson to the entire fraternity of world cinema (Hindustan Times, 14 November 2003)
- Unique in the landscape of German cinema. The German cinema-buddha:Roland Reber. (Sueddeutsche Zeitung, Feuilleton, 2009)
- Masterpiece! (Deadline (magazine))
- Filming against the current (Chilli Magazin, April 2008)
