= 2015 Team3M season =

This article gives an overview of the Team3M cycling team during season 2015.

== Overview ==
Main sponsor: 3M
General manager: Bernard Moerman
Team leaders: Frank Boeckx, Walter Maes, Tim Lacroix
Bicycles: Cannondale

== Team roster ==
Name	Birthday	Nationality	UCI Score	Team in 2014
Gertjan De Vos	1991-08-07	Belgium	0	
Jaap de Man	1993-03-28	Netherlands	4	
Martijn Degreve	1993-04-14	Belgium	10	
Jimmy Janssens	1989-05-30	Belgium	65	
Connor Mcconvey	1988-07-20	Ireland	66	Synergy Baku Cycling Project
Fabrice Mels	1992-08-17	Belgium	0	Cibel
David Montgomery	1995-06-27	Ireland	4	Neo
Kevin Panhuyzen	1994-06-24	Belgium	0	Neo
Dimitri Peyskens	1991-11-26	Belgium	1	Lotto - Belisol U23
Elliott Porter	1991-12-31	Great Britain	14	Rapha Condor JLT
Jack Sadler	1995-02-25	Ireland	0	Rapha Condor JLT
Christophe Sleurs	1990-06-25	Belgium	1	
Jake Tanner	1991-11-06	Great Britain	4	Christina Watches-Kuma
Melvin van Zijl	1991-12-10	Netherlands	0	
Dylan van Zijl	1994-12-06	Netherlands	0	
Geert van der Weijst	1990-04-06	Netherlands	89	Cyclingteam Jo Piels
Tim Vanspeybroeck	1991-03-08	Belgium	16	
Nicolas Vereecken	1990-02-21	Belgium	116	Vérandas Willems
Emiel Vermeulen	1993-02-16	Belgium	16	
Michael Vingerling	1990-06-28	Netherlands	69	

== Season victories ==
Date	Race	Competition	Rider	Country	Location
15 March	Omloop van het Waasland	UCI Europe Tour	Geert van der Weijst (NED)	Belgium	Stekene
27 March	Tour de Normandie, Stage 4	UCI Europe Tour	Nicolas Vereecken (BEL)	France	Bagnoles-de-l'Orne
29 March	Tour de Normandie, Sprints classification	UCI Europe Tour	Tim Vanspeybroeck (BEL)	France	
2 April	Three Days of De Panne, Sprints classification	UCI Europe Tour	Michael Vingerling (NED)	Belgium	
6 April	Le Triptyque des Monts et Châteaux, Mountains classification	UCI Europe Tour	Nicolas Vereecken (BEL)	Belgium	
6 April	Le Triptyque des Monts et Châteaux, Sprints classification	UCI Europe Tour	Nicolas Vereecken (BEL)	Belgium	
17 May	Olympia's Tour, Sprints classification	UCI Europe Tour	Nicolas Vereecken (BEL)	Netherlands	
