= 2016 Team3M season =

This article gives an overview of the Team3M cycling team during season 2016.

== Overview ==
Main sponsor: 3M
General manager: Bernard Moerman
Team leaders: Frank Boeckx, Tim Lacroix, Walter Maes, Thierry Fevery
Bicycles: Ridley

== Team roster ==
Name	Birthday	Nationality	UCI Score	Team in 2015
Edwig Cammaerts	1987-07-17	Belgium		Veranclassic-Ekoi
Jaap de Man	1993-03-28	Netherlands		
Gertjan De Vos	1991-08-07	Belgium		
Martijn Degreve	1993-04-14	Belgium		
Laurent Evrard	1991-09-22	Belgium		Wallonie-Bruxelles
Jelle Goderis	1991-03-24	Belgium		Veranclassic-Ekoi
Piotr Havik	1991-07-07	Netherlands		Rabobank Development Team
Yoeri Havik	1991-02-19	Netherlands		SEG Racing
Jimmy Janssens	1989-05-30	Belgium		
Dick Janssens	1994-08-01	Netherlands		De Jonge Renner
Jerôme Kerf	1991-09-01	Belgium		Vérandas Willems
Christophe Sleurs	1990-06-25	Belgium		
Ricardo van Dongen	1994-07-18	Netherlands		SEG Racing
Bob Schoonbroodt	1991-02-12	Netherlands		Parkhotel Valkenburg Continental Cycling Team
Emiel Vermeulen	1993-02-16	Belgium		
Michael Vingerling	1990-06-28	Netherlands		
Kenny Willems	1993-10-28	Belgium		Rock Werchter Toekomstvrienden Cycling Team
Melvin Van Zijl	1991-12-10	Belgium		
