= 2019 Tour de Wallonie =

2019 UCI Europe Tour

Race details
- Dates: 27 – 31 July 2019
- Stages: 5
- Distance: 931.7 km (578.9 mi)
- Winning time: 22h 12' 13"

Results
Jersey awarded to the overall winner	Winner	Loïc Vliegen (BEL)	(Wanty–Gobert)
	Second	Tosh van der Sande (BEL)	(Lotto–Soudal)
	Third	Dries De Bondt (BEL)	(Corendon–Circus)
Jersey awarded to the points classification winner	Points	Bryan Coquard (FRA)	(Vital Concept–B&B Hotels)
Jersey awarded to the mountains classification winner	Mountains	Toon Aerts (BEL)	(Telenet–Fidea Lions)
Jersey awarded to the youth classification winner	Youth	Chris Lawless (GBR)	(Team Ineos)
Jersey awarded to the sprints classification winner	Sprints	Emiel Vermeulen (BEL)	(Natura4Ever–Roubaix–Lille Métropole)
	Team	Team Ineos	

The 2019 VOO-Tour de Wallonie was a five-stage men's professional road cycling race, held in Belgium as a 2.HC race on the 2019 UCI Europe Tour. It was the forty-sixth running of the Tour de Wallonie, starting on 27 July in Le Roeulx and finishing on 31 July in Thuin.

== Schedule ==
Stage characteristics and winners
Stage	Date	Route	Distance	Type	Winner
1	27 July	Le Roeulx to Dottignies	186.4 km (115.8 mi)	Hilly stage	Timothy Dupont (BEL)
2	28 July	Waremme to Beyne-Heusay	170.8 km (106.1 mi)	Hilly stage	Loïc Vliegen (BEL)
3	29 July	La Roche-en-Ardenne to Verviers	205.6 km (127.8 mi)	Hilly stage	Davide Cimolai (ITA)
4	30 July	Villers-le-Bouillet to Lierneux	178.2 km (110.7 mi)	Hilly stage	Arnaud Démare (FRA)
5	31 July	Couvin to Thuin	190.7 km (118.5 mi)	Hilly stage	Tosh Van der Sande (BEL)
Total		931.7 km (578.9 mi)			

== Teams ==
Nineteen teams of seven riders entered the race. Of these teams, six were UCI WorldTour teams, ten were UCI Professional Continental teams, and three were UCI Continental teams.

UCI WorldTeams

- AG2R La Mondiale
- CCC Team
- Groupama–FDJ
- Lotto–Soudal
- Team Katusha–Alpecin
- Team Ineos

UCI Professional Continental Teams

- Cofidis
- Corendon–Circus
- Israel Cycling Academy
- Riwal Readynez
- Roompot–Charles
- Sport Vlaanderen–Baloise
- Total Direct Énergie
- Vital Concept–B&B Hotels
- Wallonie Bruxelles
- Wanty–Gobert

UCI Continental Teams

- Natura4Ever–Roubaix–Lille Métropole
- Tarteletto–Isorex
- Telenet–Fidea Lions

== Stages ==
=== Stage 1 ===
27 July 2019 — Le Roeulx to Dottignies, 186.4 km (115.8 mi)

Stage 1 result
Rank	Rider	Team	Time
1	Timothy Dupont (BEL)	Wanty–Gobert	4h 22' 44"
2	Roy Jans (BEL)	Corendon–Circus	+ 0"
3	Jakub Mareczko (ITA)	CCC Team	+ 0"
4	Julien Duval (FRA)	AG2R La Mondiale	+ 0"
5	Tom Van Asbroeck (BEL)	Israel Cycling Academy	+ 0"
6	Bryan Coquard (FRA)	Vital Concept–B&B Hotels	+ 0"
7	Tosh Van der Sande (BEL)	Lotto–Soudal	+ 0"
8	Damien Touzé (FRA)	Cofidis	+ 0"
9	Andreas Nielsen (DEN)	Riwal Readynez	+ 0"
10	Amaury Capiot (BEL)	Sport Vlaanderen–Baloise	+ 0"

General classification after stage 1
Rank	Rider	Team	Time
1	Timothy Dupont (BEL)	Wanty–Gobert	4h 22' 34"
2	Roy Jans (BEL)	Corendon–Circus	+ 4"
3	Kevyn Ista (BEL)	Wallonie Bruxelles	+ 4"
4	Jakub Mareczko (ITA)	CCC Team	+ 6"
5	Edward Planckaert (BEL)	Sport Vlaanderen–Baloise	+ 6"
6	Dries De Bondt (BEL)	Corendon–Circus	+ 7"
7	Baptiste Planckaert (BEL)	Wallonie Bruxelles	+ 8"
8	Abram Stockman (BEL)	Tarteletto–Isorex	+ 9"
9	Julien Duval (FRA)	AG2R La Mondiale	+ 10"
10	Tom Van Asbroeck (BEL)	Israel Cycling Academy	+ 10"

=== Stage 2 ===
28 July 2019 — Waremme to Beyne-Heusay, 170.8 km (106.1 mi)

Stage 2 result
Rank	Rider	Team	Time
1	Loïc Vliegen (BEL)	Wanty–Gobert	4h 04' 37"
2	Chris Lawless (GBR)	Team Ineos	+ 8"
3	Quinten Hermans (BEL)	Telenet–Fidea Lions	+ 12"
4	Dimitri Claeys (BEL)	Cofidis	+ 12"
5	Dorian Godon (FRA)	AG2R La Mondiale	+ 12"
6	Ruben Guerreiro (POR)	Team Katusha–Alpecin	+ 12"
7	Damien Touzé (FRA)	Cofidis	+ 12"
8	Lucas Eriksson (SWE)	Riwal Readynez	+ 12"
9	Tobias Ludvigsson (SWE)	Groupama–FDJ	+ 12"
10	Eddie Dunbar (IRL)	Team Ineos	+ 12"

General classification after stage 2
Rank	Rider	Team	Time
1	Loïc Vliegen (BEL)	Wanty–Gobert	8h 27' 11"
2	Chris Lawless (GBR)	Team Ineos	+ 12"
3	Quinten Hermans (BEL)	Telenet–Fidea Lions	+ 18"
4	Dries De Bondt (BEL)	Corendon–Circus	+ 19"
5	Damien Touzé (FRA)	Cofidis	+ 22"
6	Tosh Van der Sande (BEL)	Lotto–Soudal	+ 22"
7	Jenthe Biermans (BEL)	Team Katusha–Alpecin	+ 22"
8	Ruben Guerreiro (POR)	Team Katusha–Alpecin	+ 22"
9	Milan Menten (BEL)	Sport Vlaanderen–Baloise	+ 22"
10	Dorian Godon (FRA)	AG2R La Mondiale	+ 22"

=== Stage 3 ===
29 July 2019 — La Roche-en-Ardenne to Verviers, 205.6 km (127.8 mi)

Stage 3 result
Rank	Rider	Team	Time
1	Davide Cimolai (ITA)	Israel Cycling Academy	4h 40' 43"
2	Amaury Capiot (BEL)	Sport Vlaanderen–Baloise	+ 0"
3	Bryan Coquard (FRA)	Vital Concept–B&B Hotels	+ 0"
4	Lionel Taminiaux (BEL)	Wallonie Bruxelles	+ 0"
5	Tosh Van der Sande (BEL)	Lotto–Soudal	+ 0"
6	Milan Menten (BEL)	Sport Vlaanderen–Baloise	+ 0"
7	Timothy Dupont (BEL)	Wanty–Gobert	+ 0"
8	Quinten Hermans (BEL)	Telenet–Fidea Lions	+ 0"
9	Dorian Godon (FRA)	AG2R La Mondiale	+ 0"
10	Kévin Reza (FRA)	Vital Concept–B&B Hotels	+ 0"

General classification after stage 3
Rank	Rider	Team	Time
1	Loïc Vliegen (BEL)	Wanty–Gobert	13h 07' 54"
2	Chris Lawless (GBR)	Team Ineos	+ 12"
3	Dries De Bondt (BEL)	Corendon–Circus	+ 13"
4	Quinten Hermans (BEL)	Telenet–Fidea Lions	+ 18"
5	Kenneth Van Rooy (BEL)	Sport Vlaanderen–Baloise	+ 18"
6	Aurélien Paret-Peintre (FRA)	AG2R La Mondiale	+ 19"
7	Dimitri Claeys (BEL)	Cofidis	+ 21"
8	Tosh Van der Sande (BEL)	Lotto–Soudal	+ 22"
9	Damien Touzé (FRA)	Cofidis	+ 22"
10	Milan Menten (BEL)	Sport Vlaanderen–Baloise	+ 22"

=== Stage 4 ===
30 July 2019 — Villers-le-Bouillet to Lierneux, 178.2 km (110.7 mi)

Stage 4 result
Rank	Rider	Team	Time
1	Arnaud Démare (FRA)	Groupama–FDJ	4h 26' 52"
2	Szymon Sajnok (POL)	CCC Team	+ 0"
3	Stijn Steels (BEL)	Roompot–Charles	+ 0"
4	Romain Cardis (FRA)	Total Direct Énergie	+ 0"
5	Dries De Bondt (BEL)	Corendon–Circus	+ 0"
6	Amaury Capiot (BEL)	Sport Vlaanderen–Baloise	+ 0"
7	Baptiste Planckaert (BEL)	Wallonie Bruxelles	+ 0"
8	Bryan Coquard (FRA)	Vital Concept–B&B Hotels	+ 0"
9	Tosh Van der Sande (BEL)	Lotto–Soudal	+ 0"
10	Chris Lawless (GBR)	Team Ineos	+ 0"

General classification after stage 4
Rank	Rider	Team	Time
1	Loïc Vliegen (BEL)	Wanty–Gobert	17h 34' 46"
2	Chris Lawless (GBR)	Team Ineos	+ 12"
3	Dries De Bondt (BEL)	Corendon–Circus	+ 13"
4	Eddie Dunbar (IRL)	Team Ineos	+ 16"
5	Kenneth Van Rooy (BEL)	Sport Vlaanderen–Baloise	+ 18"
6	Quinten Hermans (BEL)	Telenet–Fidea Lions	+ 18"
7	Aurélien Paret-Peintre (FRA)	AG2R La Mondiale	+ 19"
8	Dimitri Claeys (BEL)	Cofidis	+ 21"
9	Tosh Van der Sande (BEL)	Lotto–Soudal	+ 22"
10	Milan Menten (BEL)	Sport Vlaanderen–Baloise	+ 22"

=== Stage 5 ===
31 July 2019 — Couvin to Thuin, 190.7 km (118.5 mi)

Stage 5 result
Rank	Rider	Team	Time
1	Tosh Van der Sande (BEL)	Lotto–Soudal	4h 37' 23"
2	Bryan Coquard (FRA)	Vital Concept–B&B Hotels	+ 1"
3	Dries De Bondt (BEL)	Corendon–Circus	+ 3"
4	Amaury Capiot (BEL)	Sport Vlaanderen–Baloise	+ 3"
5	Tobias Ludvigsson (SWE)	Groupama–FDJ	+ 3"
6	Davide Cimolai (ITA)	Israel Cycling Academy	+ 3"
7	Loïc Vliegen (BEL)	Wanty–Gobert	+ 4"
8	Milan Menten (BEL)	Sport Vlaanderen–Baloise	+ 7"
9	Quinten Hermans (BEL)	Telenet–Fidea Lions	+ 7"
10	Timothy Dupont (BEL)	Wanty–Gobert	+ 7"

General classification after stage 5
Rank	Rider	Team	Time
1	Loïc Vliegen (BEL)	Wanty–Gobert	22h 12' 13"
2	Tosh Van der Sande (BEL)	Lotto–Soudal	+ 8"
3	Dries De Bondt (BEL)	Corendon–Circus	+ 8"
4	Chris Lawless (GBR)	Team Ineos	+ 15"
5	Quentin Pacher (FRA)	Vital Concept–B&B Hotels	+ 16"
6	Eddie Dunbar (IRL)	Team Ineos	+ 19"
7	Quinten Hermans (BEL)	Telenet–Fidea Lions	+ 21"
8	Kenneth Van Rooy (BEL)	Sport Vlaanderen–Baloise	+ 21"
9	Tobias Ludvigsson (SWE)	Groupama–FDJ	+ 21"
10	Aurélien Paret-Peintre (FRA)	AG2R La Mondiale	+ 22"

== Classification leadership table ==
In the 2019 Tour de Wallonie, five different jerseys were awarded. The general classification was calculated by adding each cyclist's finishing times on each stage, and allowing time bonuses for the first three finishers at intermediate sprints (three seconds to first, two seconds to second, and one second to third) and at the finish of all stages to the first three finishers: the stage winner won a ten-second bonus, with six and four seconds for the second and third riders respectively. The leader of the classification received a yellow jersey; it was considered the most important of the 2019 Tour de Wallonie, and the winner of the classification was considered the winner of the race.

Points for the mountains classification
Position	1	2	3	4	5
Points for Category 1	10	8	6	4	2
Points for Category 2	6	4	2	0	

There was also a mountains classification, the leadership of which was marked by a white jersey. In the mountains classification, points towards the classification were won by reaching the top of a climb before other cyclists. Each climb was categorised as either first, or second-category, with more points available for the higher-categorised climbs.

Points for the points classification
Position	1	2	3	4	5	6	7	8	9	10
Stage finishes	25	20	15	10	8	6	4	3	2	1

Additionally, there was a points classification, which awarded a green jersey. In the points classification, cyclists received points for finishing in the top 10 in a stage. For winning a stage, a rider earned 25 points, with 20 for second, 15 for third, 10 for fourth and so on, down to 1 point for 10th place. There was also a separate classification for the intermediate sprints, rewarding a purple jersey. Points towards the classification were awarded on a 5–3–1 scale at intermediate sprint points during each stage; these intermediate sprints also offered bonus seconds towards the general classification as noted above.

Finally, the leader in the classification for young riders, wore a red bib number. This was decided the same way as the general classification, but only riders born after 28 July 1995 were eligible to be ranked in the classification. There was also a team classification, in which the times of the best three cyclists per team on each stage were added together; the leading team at the end of the race was the team with the lowest total time. A combativity award was also given each day to the most aggressive rider on that stage.

Stage	Winner	General classification	Points classification	Mountains classification	Young rider classification	Sprints classification	Teams classification	Combativity award
1	Timothy Dupont	Timothy Dupont	Timothy Dupont	Nicolai Brøchner	Abram Stockman	Kevyn Ista	Cofidis	Edward Planckaert
2	Loïc Vliegen	Loïc Vliegen	Loïc Vliegen	Toon Aerts	Chris Lawless	Emiel Vermeulen	Wanty–Gobert	Tom Wirtgen
3	Davide Cimolai	Loïc Vliegen	Timothy Dupont	Toon Aerts	Chris Lawless	Dries De Bondt	Wanty–Gobert	Thijs Aerts
4	Arnaud Démare	Loïc Vliegen	Timothy Dupont	Toon Aerts	Chris Lawless	Emiel Vermeulen	Team Ineos	Arnaud Démare
5	Tosh Van der Sande	Loïc Vliegen	Bryan Coquard	Toon Aerts	Chris Lawless	Emiel Vermeulen	Team Ineos	Lionel Taminiaux
Final		Loïc Vliegen	Bryan Coquard	Toon Aerts	Chris Lawless	Emiel Vermeulen	Team Ineos	No final award

- On stage two, Roy Jans, who was second in the points classification, wore the green jersey, because first placed Timothy Dupont wore the yellow jersey as leader of the general classification.
- On stage three, Timothy Dupont, who was second in the points classification, wore the green jersey, because first placed Loïc Vliegen wore the yellow jersey as leader of the general classification.

== Final classification standings ==
Legend
Denotes the winner of the general classification	Denotes the winner of the young rider classification
Denotes the winner of the points classification	Denotes the winner of the sprints classification
Denotes the winner of the mountains classification	

=== General classification ===
Final general classification (1-10)
Rank	Rider	Team	Time
1	Loïc Vliegen (BEL)	Wanty–Gobert	22h 12' 13"
2	Tosh Van der Sande (BEL)	Lotto–Soudal	+ 8"
3	Dries De Bondt (BEL)	Corendon–Circus	+ 8"
4	Chris Lawless (GBR)	Team Ineos	+ 15"
5	Quentin Pacher (FRA)	Vital Concept–B&B Hotels	+ 16"
6	Eddie Dunbar (IRL)	Team Ineos	+ 19"
7	Quinten Hermans (BEL)	Telenet–Fidea Lions	+ 21"
8	Kenneth Van Rooy (BEL)	Sport Vlaanderen–Baloise	+ 21"
9	Tobias Ludvigsson (SWE)	Groupama–FDJ	+ 21"
10	Aurélien Paret-Peintre (FRA)	AG2R La Mondiale	+ 22"

=== Points classification ===
Final points classification (1-10)
Rank	Rider	Team	Points
1	Bryan Coquard (FRA)	Vital Concept–B&B Hotels	44
2	Tosh Van der Sande (BEL)	Lotto–Soudal	39
3	Amaury Capiot (BEL)	Sport Vlaanderen–Baloise	37
4	Davide Cimolai (ITA)	Israel Cycling Academy	31
5	Timothy Dupont (BEL)	Wanty–Gobert	30
6	Loïc Vliegen (BEL)	Wanty–Gobert	29
7	Arnaud Démare (FRA)	Groupama–FDJ	25
8	Dries De Bondt (BEL)	Corendon–Circus	23
9	Chris Lawless (GBR)	Team Ineos	21
10	Quinten Hermans (BEL)	Telenet–Fidea Lions	20

=== Mountains classification ===
Final mountains classification (1-10)
Rank	Rider	Team	Points
1	Toon Aerts (BEL)	Telenet–Fidea Lions	82
2	Elmar Reinders (NED)	Roompot–Charles	24
3	Arnaud Démare (FRA)	Groupama–FDJ	20
4	Floris Gerts (BEL)	Tarteletto–Isorex	16
5	Clément Carisey (FRA)	Israel Cycling Academy	14
6	Dimitri Claeys (BEL)	Cofidis	14
7	Diego Rosa (ITA)	Team Ineos	14
8	Emiel Vermeulen (BEL)	Natura4Ever–Roubaix–Lille Métropole	14
9	Eddie Dunbar (IRL)	Team Ineos	12
10	Thijs Aerts (BEL)	Telenet–Fidea Lions	10

=== Sprints classification ===
Final sprints classification (1-10)
Rank	Rider	Team	Points
1	Emiel Vermeulen (BEL)	Natura4Ever–Roubaix–Lille Métropole	20
2	Dries De Bondt (BEL)	Corendon–Circus	15
3	Quentin Pacher (FRA)	Vital Concept–B&B Hotels	15
4	Eddie Dunbar (IRL)	Team Ineos	10
5	Amaury Capiot (BEL)	Sport Vlaanderen–Baloise	9
6	Kenneth Van Rooy (BEL)	Sport Vlaanderen–Baloise	6
7	Edward Planckaert (BEL)	Sport Vlaanderen–Baloise	6
8	Toon Aerts (BEL)	Telenet–Fidea Lions	6
9	Aurélien Paret-Peintre (FRA)	AG2R La Mondiale	5
10	Elmar Reinders (NED)	Roompot–Charles	5

=== Young rider classification ===
Final young rider classification (1-10)
Rank	Rider	Team	Time
1	Chris Lawless (GBR)	Team Ineos	22h 12' 28"
2	Eddie Dunbar (IRL)	Team Ineos	+ 4"
3	Quinten Hermans (BEL)	Telenet–Fidea Lions	+ 6"
4	Aurélien Paret-Peintre (FRA)	AG2R La Mondiale	+ 7"
5	Milan Menten (BEL)	Sport Vlaanderen–Baloise	+ 10"
6	Jenthe Biermans (BEL)	Team Katusha–Alpecin	+ 10"
7	Dorian Godon (FRA)	AG2R La Mondiale	+ 10"
8	Lucas Eriksson (SWE)	Riwal Readynez	+ 10"
9	Nathan Van Hooydonck (BEL)	CCC Team	+ 10"
10	Nicolas Cleppe (BEL)	Telenet–Fidea Lions	+ 23"

=== Teams classification ===
Final teams classification (1-10)
Rank	Team	Time
1	Team Ineos	66h 37' 50"
2	AG2R La Mondiale	+ 16"
3	Vital Concept–B&B Hotels	+ 30"
4	Lotto–Soudal	+ 1' 06"
5	Sport Vlaanderen–Baloise	+ 1' 26"
6	Groupama–FDJ	+ 2' 35"
7	Team Katusha–Alpecin	+ 4' 26"
8	Roompot–Charles	+ 4' 28"
9	Wanty–Gobert	+ 4' 37"
10	Cofidis	+ 4' 59"
