= Weide =

Weide may refer to:

== Places ==
- Weide Army Airfield, an airfield in Edgewood Arsenal, Maryland, U.S.
- German name of the Widawa River in Poland

== People ==
- Hu Weide (Chinese: 胡惟德; 1863–1933), Chinese politician and diplomat
- Huang Weide (Chinese: 黃維德), Taiwanese actor and singer
- Robert B. Weide (born 1959), American writer, producer, and director
- Sander van der Weide (born 1976), field hockey player
- Su Weide (Chinese: 苏炜德; born 2000), Chinese artistic gymnast

== See also ==
- Van der Weide, Dutch surname
