= Dutch National Time Trial Championships =

National road cycling championship in the Netherlands

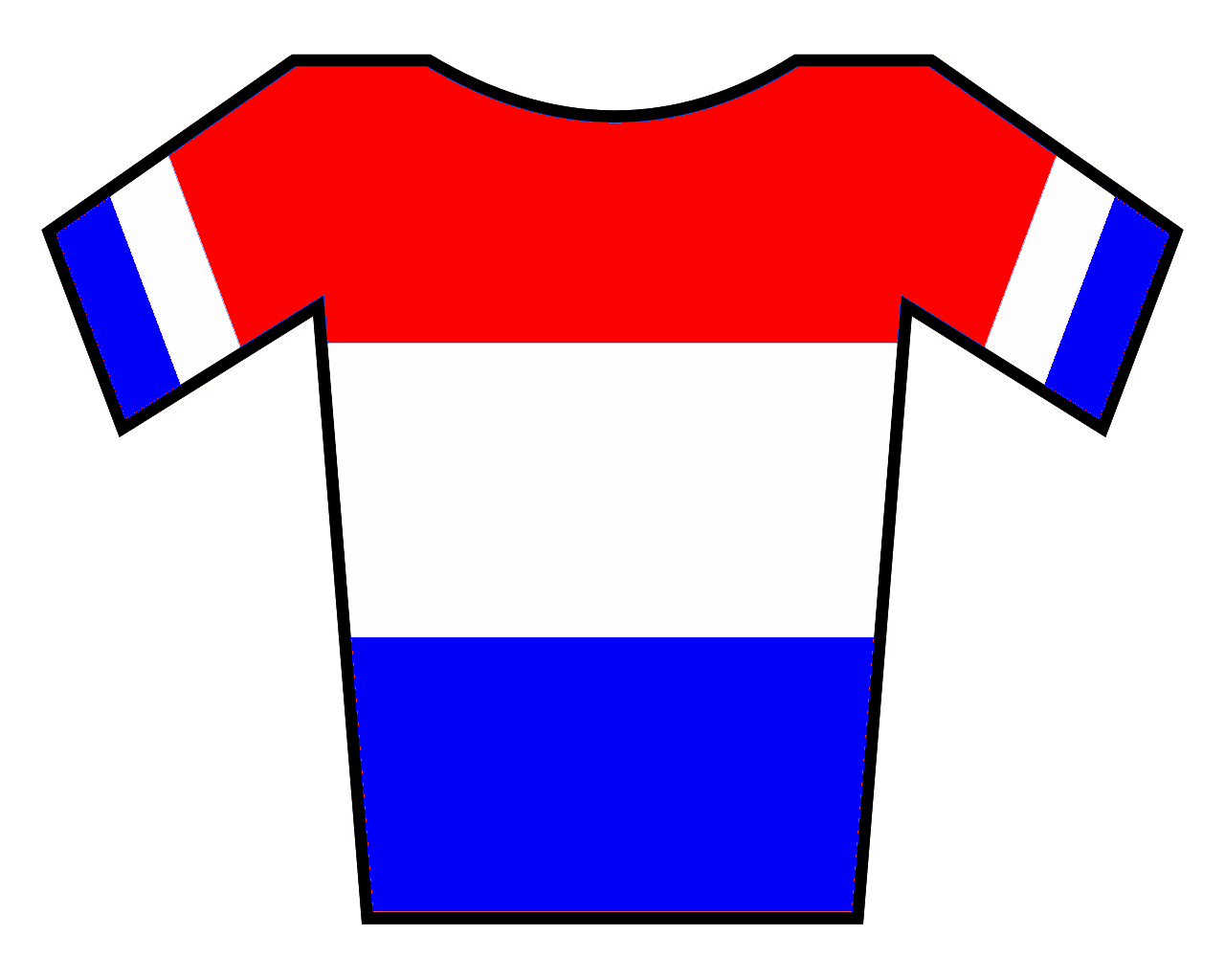
- The champion's jersey
- Sport: Road bicycle racing
- Founded: 1991
- Country: Netherlands
- Most recent champions: Men's: Jos van Emden; Women's: Riejanne Markus
- Website: http://www.nk-tijdrijden.nl/

The Dutch National Time Trial Championship is a time trial race that takes place inside the Dutch National Cycling Championship, and decides the best cyclist in this type of race. The first edition took place in 1991. The first race winner of the time trial championship was Bart Voskamp in 1991. Stef Clement and Tom Dumoulin hold the record for the most wins in the men's championship with four. The women's record is held by Leontien van Moorsel with six wins.

== Multiple winners ==
=== Men ===
Wins	Name	Years
4	Stef Clement	2006, 2007, 2009, 2011
4	Tom Dumoulin	2014, 2016, 2017, 2021
3	Bart Voskamp	1991, 1999, 2001
3	Erik Dekker	1996, 2000, 2002
3	Jos van Emden	2010, 2019, 2023
2	Erik Breukink	1995, 1997
2	Thomas Dekker	2004, 2005
2	Lieuwe Westra	2012, 2013

=== Women ===
Wins	Name	Years
6	Leontien van Moorsel	1997–2002
5	Ellen van Dijk	2007, 2012, 2013, 2018, 2022
4	Annemiek van Vleuten	2014, 2016, 2017, 2019
2	Mirjam Melchers	2004, 2008
2	Marianne Vos	2010, 2011
2	Anna van der Breggen	2015, 2021
2	Riejanne Markus	2023, 2024

== Men ==
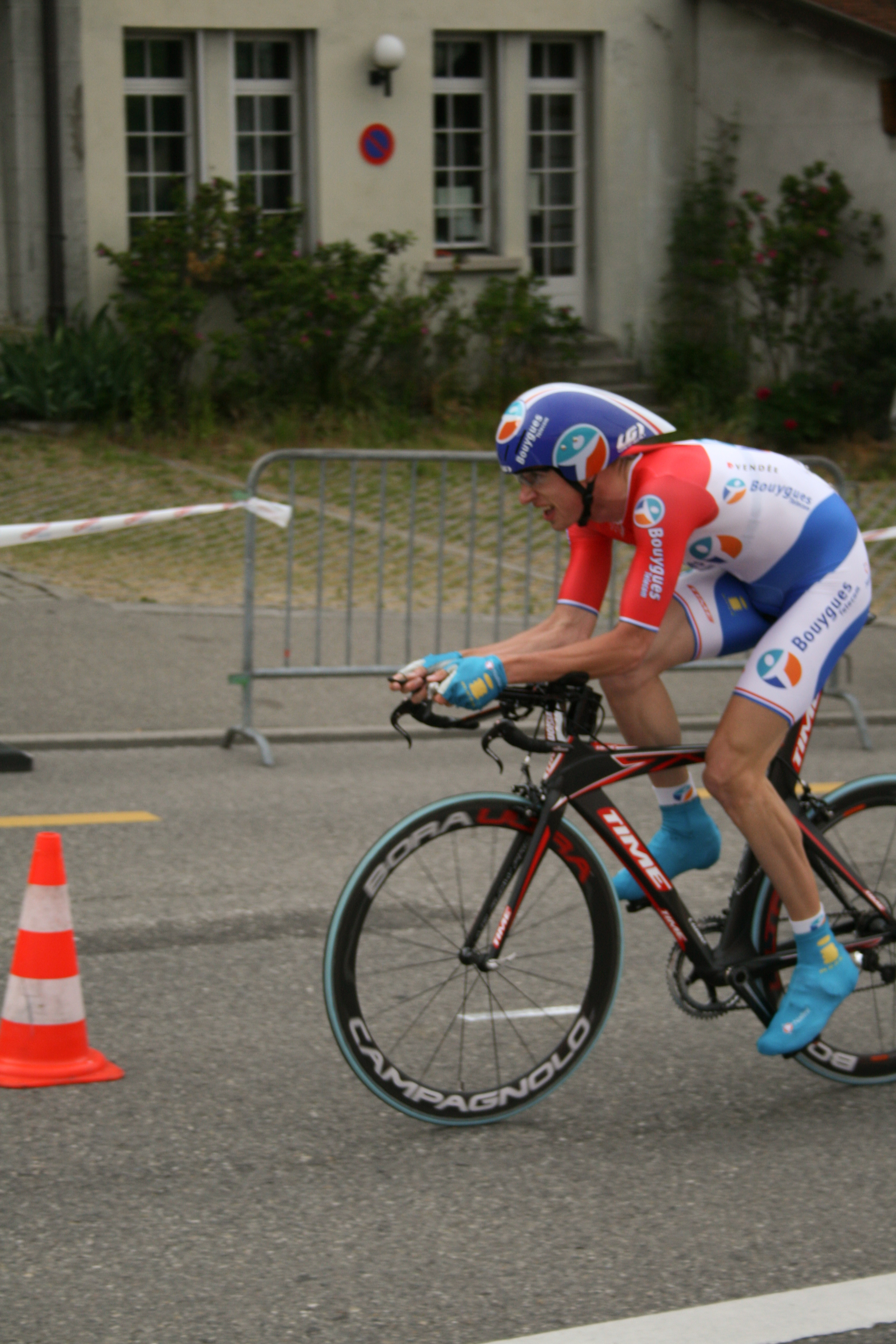
Stef Clement

=== Elite ===
Year	Gold	Silver	Bronze
1991	Bart Voskamp	Léon van Bon	Servais Knaven
1992	Arnold Stam	Patrick van Dijken	Jos Wolfkamp
1993	Jos Wolfkamp	Jaap ten Kortenaar	Pelle Tobias Kil
1994	Mario Gutte	Jos Wolfkamp	Jaap ten Kortenaar
1995	Erik Breukink	Frans Maassen	Patrick van Dijken
1996	Erik Dekker	Danny Nelissen	Jelle Nijdam
1997	Erik Breukink	Erik Dekker	Servais Knaven
1998	Patrick Jonker	Servais Knaven	Wilco Zuijderwijk
1999	Bart Voskamp	Erik Dekker	Renger Ypenburg
2000	Erik Dekker	Servais Knaven	Maarten Den Bakker
2001	Bart Voskamp	Remco van der Ven	Jan van Velzen
2002	Erik Dekker	Servais Knaven	Paul van Schalen
2003	Maarten den Bakker	Bart Voskamp	Servais Knaven
2004	Thomas Dekker	Joost Posthuma	Bart Voskamp
2005	Thomas Dekker	Erik Dekker	Michiel Elijzen
2006	Stef Clement	Erik Dekker	Joost Posthuma
2007	Stef Clement	Michiel Elijzen	Rick Flens
2008	Lars Boom	Joost Posthuma	Koen de Kort
2009	Stef Clement	Koos Moerenhout	Rick Flens
2010	Jos van Emden	Koos Moerenhout	Lieuwe Westra
2011	Stef Clement	Jens Mouris	Martijn Keizer
2012	Lieuwe Westra	Lars Boom	Niki Terpstra
2013	Lieuwe Westra	Niki Terpstra	Tom Dumoulin
2014	Tom Dumoulin	Sebastian Langeveld	Jos van Emden
2015	Wilco Kelderman	Rick Flens	Jos van Emden
2016	Tom Dumoulin	Jos van Emden	Wilco Kelderman
2017	Tom Dumoulin	Stef Clement	Robert Gesink
2018	Dylan van Baarle	Niki Terpstra	Wilco Kelderman
2019	Jos van Emden	Sebastian Langeveld	Dylan van Baarle
2021	Tom Dumoulin	Sebastian Langeveld	Koen Bouwman
2022	Bauke Mollema	Tom Dumoulin	Daan Hoole
2023	Jos van Emden	Daan Hoole	Sjoerd Bax
2024	Daan Hoole	Mick van Dijke	Sjoerd Bax

=== U23 ===
Year	Gold	Silver	Bronze
1997	Daniël van Elven	Remco van der Ven	Angelo Van Melis
1998	Marcel Duijn	Huub Bres	Coen Boerman
1999	Remmert Wielinga	Rick Pieterse	Vincent van der Kooij
2000	Remmert Wielinga	Jens Mouris	Roel Egelmeers
2001	Mart Louwers	Jens Mouris	Michiel Elijzen
2002	Stef Clement	Niels Scheuneman	Rick Flens
2003	Thomas Dekker	Niels Scheuneman	Joost Posthuma
2004	Thom Van Dulmen	Michiel Elijzen	Mathieu Heijboer
2005	Thom Van Dulmen	Levi Heimans	Tom Stamsnijder
2006	Kai Reus	Lars Boom	Niki Terpstra
2007	Lars Boom	Jos van Emden	Ronan van Zandbeek
2008	Emmanuel Van Ruitenbeek	Martijn Keizer	Dennis van Winden
2009	Dennis van Winden	Steven Kruijswijk	Martijn Keizer
2010	Martijn Keizer	Jasper Hamelink	Marc Goos
2011	Wilco Kelderman	Jasper Hamelink	Marc Goos
2012	Peter Koning	Bob Schoonbroodt	Marc Goos
2013	Dylan van Baarle	Sjors Roosen	Martijn Tusveld
2014	Steven Lammertink	Mike Teunissen	Tim Rodenburg
2015	Steven Lammertink	Martijn Tusveld	Tim Rodenburg
2016	Tim Rodenburg	Pascal Eenkhoorn	Jan-Willem van Schip
2017	Julius van den Berg	Pascal Eenkhoorn	Bas Tietema
2018	Hartthijs de Vries	Nils Eekhoff	Daan Hoole
2019	Daan Hoole	Wessel Krul	Nils Sinschek
2021	Mick van Dijke	Tim van Dijke	Marijn van den Berg
2022	Axel van der Tuuk	Mike Vliek	Enzo Leijnse
2023	Enzo Leijnse	Bodi del Grosso	Axel van der Tuuk
2024	Wessel Mouris	Pepijn Veenings	Elmar Abma

=== Junior ===
Year	Gold	Silver	Bronze
2000	Peter van Agtmaal	Kenny van Hummel	Koen de Kort
2001	Rick Flens	Norbert Poels	Kris Kamper
2003	Kai Reus	Levi Heimans	Tom Stamsnijder
2004	Robert Gesink	Sven Kramer	Thijs van Amerongen
2005	Martijn Keizer	Rienk Nauta	Steven Kruijswijk
2006	Martijn Keizer	Jetse Bol	Ronan van Zandbeek
2007	Peter Koning	Jarno Gmelich	Maurice de Bekker
2008	Jelle Lugten	Wilco Kelderman	Jasper Bovenhuis
2009	Bob Schoonbroodt	Dylan van Baarle	Jurjen de Vries
2010	Dylan van Baarle	Oscar Riesebeek	Danny van Poppel
2011	Paul Moerland	Ivar Slik	Danny van Poppel
2012	Joeri Leijs	Randy Ophof	Tim Rodenburg
2013	Sam Oomen	Stef Krul	Jaap de Jong
2014	Sjoerd Bax	Pascal Eenkhoorn	Sieben Wouters
2015	Marten Kooistra	Pascal Eenkhoorn	Daan Zebel
2016	Stijn Daemen	Willem Bok	Mitch Groot
2017	Minne Verboom	Thymen Arensman	Daan Hoole
2018	Axel van der Tuuk	Manuel Michielsen	Enzo Leijnse
2019	Lars Boven	Enzo Leijnse	Casper van Uden
2020	Loe van Belle	Tibor del Grosso	Mathijs de Kok
2021	Tibor del Grosso	Elmar Abma	Vincent van Dorp
2022	Sjors Lugthart	Mees Vlot	Vincent van Dorp
2023	Ryan Gal	Mees Vlot	Sjors Lugthart
2024	Michiel Mouris	Senna Remijn	Gijs Schoonvelde

== Women ==
=== Elite ===
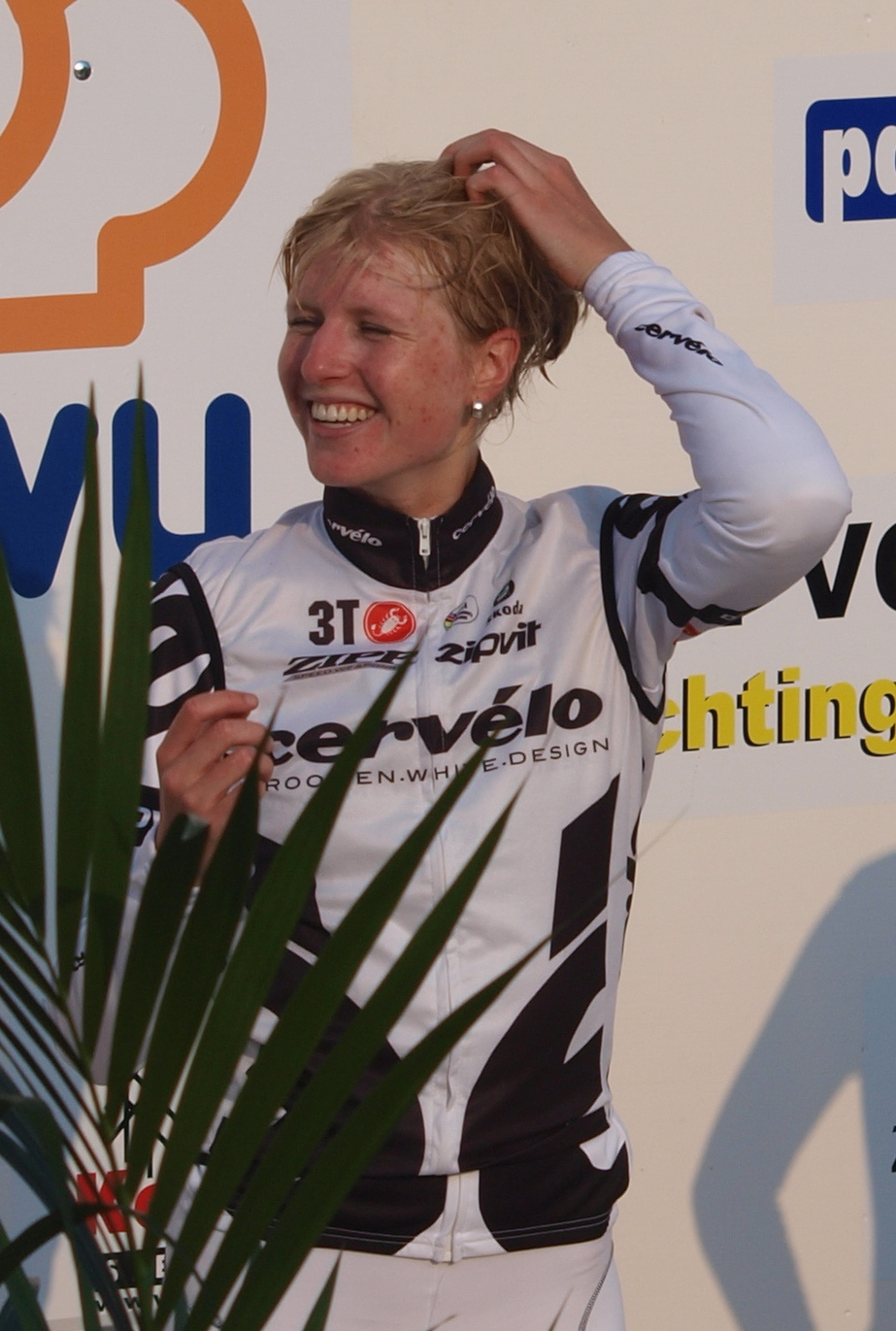
Regina Bruins on the podium after winning the title in 2009

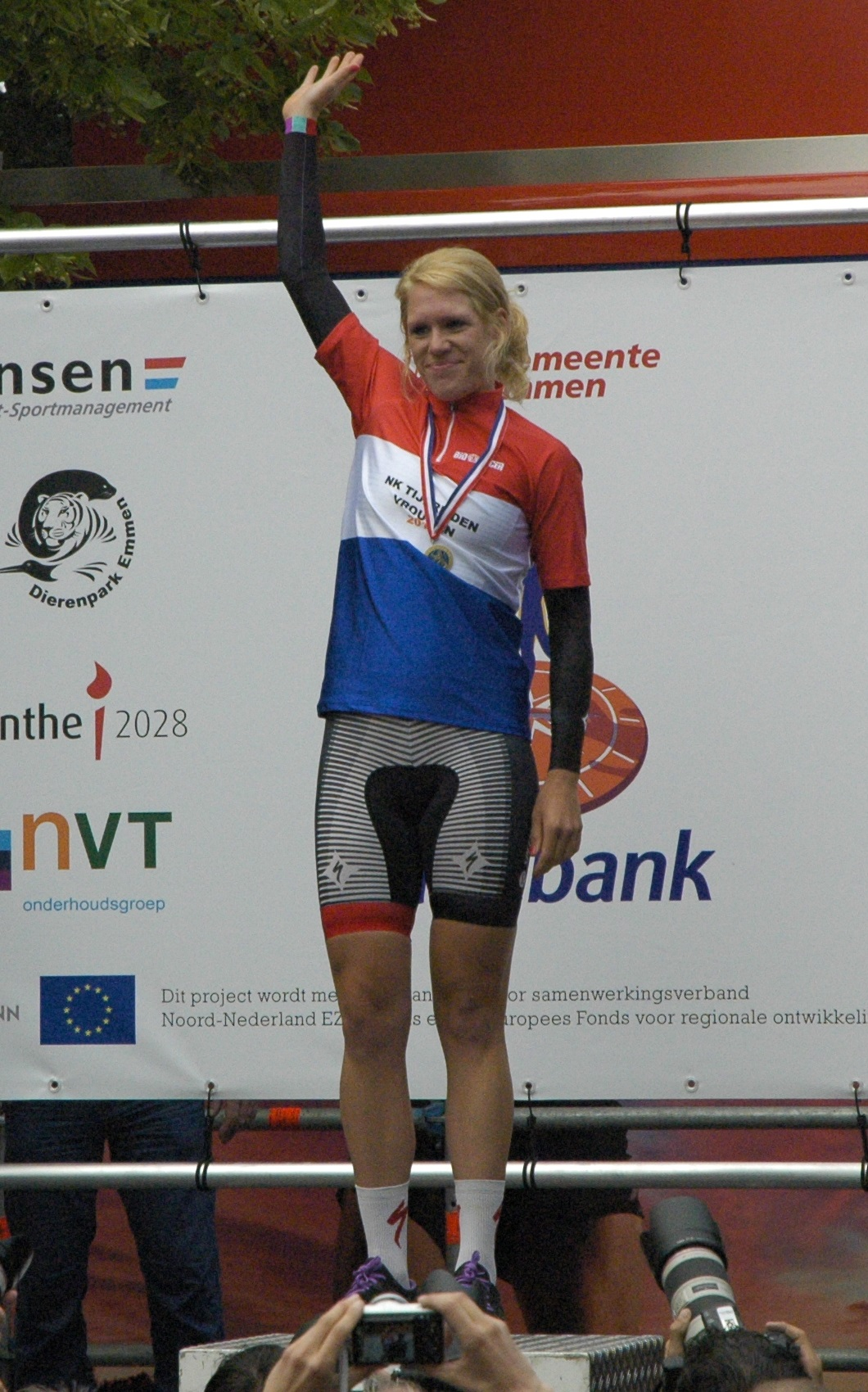
Ellen van Dijk on the podium after winning the title in 2012

Year	Gold	Silver	Bronze
1991	Ingrid Haringa	Astrid Schop	Monique Knol
1992	Lenie Dijkstra	Natascha den Ouden	Els Koolloos
1993	Petra Grimbergen	Ingrid Haringa	Natascha den Ouden
1994	Maria Jongeling	Daniëlle Overgaag	Natascha den Ouden
1995	Jet Jongeling	Maria Jongeling	Natascha den Ouden
1996	Willeke van der Weide	Nicole Vermast	Jet Jongeling
1997	Leontien van Moorsel	Mariëlle van Scheppingen	Chantal Beltman
1998	Leontien van Moorsel	Mariëlle van Scheppingen	Yvonne Brunen
1999	Leontien van Moorsel	Mirjam Melchers	Mariëlle van Scheppingen
2000	Leontien van Moorsel	Anouska van der Zee	Sonja van Kuik
2001	Leontien van Moorsel	Anouska van der Zee	Mariëlle van Scheppingen
2002	Leontien van Moorsel	Loes Gunnewijk	Vera Koedooder
2003	Jolanda van Dongen	Leontien van Moorsel	Mirjam Melchers
2004	Mirjam Melchers	Loes Gunnewijk	Loes Markerink
2005	Suzanne de Goede	Loes Gunnewijk	Mirjam Melchers
2006	Loes Gunnewijk	Kirsten Wild	Iris Slappendel
2007	Ellen van Dijk	Regina Bruins	Mirjam Melchers
2008	Mirjam Melchers	Kirsten Wild	Loes Gunnewijk
2009	Regina Bruins	Kirsten Wild	Ellen van Dijk
2010	Marianne Vos	Regina Bruins	Kirsten Wild
2011	Marianne Vos	Ellen van Dijk	Loes Gunnewijk
2012	Ellen van Dijk	Annemiek van Vleuten	Iris Slappendel
2013	Ellen van Dijk	Loes Gunnewijk	Annemiek van Vleuten
2014	Annemiek van Vleuten	Ellen van Dijk	Marianne Vos
2015	Anna van der Breggen	Ellen van Dijk	Chantal Blaak
2016	Annemiek van Vleuten	Chantal Blaak	Roxane Knetemann
2017	Annemiek van Vleuten	Ellen van Dijk	Anna van der Breggen
2018	Ellen van Dijk	Anna van der Breggen	Lucinda Brand
2019	Annemiek van Vleuten	Ellen van Dijk	Anna van der Breggen
2021	Anna van der Breggen	Ellen van Dijk	Lucinda Brand
2022	Ellen van Dijk	Riejanne Markus	Anouska Koster
2023	Riejanne Markus	Demi Vollering	Annemiek van Vleuten
2024	Riejanne Markus	Lieke Nooijen	Demi Vollering

=== U23 ===
Year	Gold	Silver	Bronze
2022	Shirin van Anrooij	Maike van der Duin	Mischa Bredewold

=== Junior ===
Year	Gold	Silver	Bronze
1996	Sonja van Kuik	Ghita Beltman	Mirella van Melis
1997	Sonja van Kuik	Danielle Jansen	Marlien de Voogd
1998	Evelien Basten	Jackelien Aerts	Sabine Gruters
1999	Evelien Basten	Saskia Kaagman	Miranda Vierling
2000	Vera Koedooder	Bertine Spijkerman	Saskia Kaagman
2001	Vera Koedooder	Miranda Vierling	Suzanne de Goede
2002	Miranda Vierling	Christa Pirard	Loes Markerink
2003	Loes Markerink	Eva Sijm	Liesbeth Bakker
2004	Ellen van Dijk	Roxane Knetemann	Marianne Vos
2005	Ellen van Dijk	Maxime Groenewegen	Marianne Vos
2006	Chantal Blaak	Linda van Rijen	Elise van Hage
2007	Chantal Blaak	Elise van Hage	Marit Huisman
2008	Lotte van Hoek	Amy Pieters	Marieke den Otter
2009	Lotte van Hoek	Amy Pieters	Birgit Lavrijssen
2010	Rebecca Talen	Annelies Visser	Henriette Woering
2011	Thalita de Jong	Pauliena Rooijakkers	Anouska Koster
2012	Corine van der Zijden	Demi de Jong	Lauren Arnouts
2013	Floortje Mackaij	Demi de Jong	Anouk Rijff
2014	Aafke Soet	Chanella Stougje	Jeanne Korevaar
2015	Yara Kastelijn	Aafke Soet	Karlijn Swinkels
2016	Maaike Boogaard	Karlijn Swinkels	Claudia Jongerius
2017	Anne de Ruiter	Marit Raaijmakers	Britt Knaven
2018	Rozemarijn Ammerlaan	Britt Knaven	Femke Gerritse
2019	Shirin van Anrooij	Leonie Bos	Maud Rijnbeek
2020	Elise Uijen	Ilse Pluimers	Shirin van Anrooij
2021	Anna van der Meiden	Mirre Knaven	Scarlett Souren
2022	Nienke Vinke	Mirre Knaven	Pem Hoefmans
2023	Fee Knaven	Tessa Kleijn	Silje Bader
2024	Fee Knaven	Puck Langenbarg	Megan Arens

== See also ==
- Dutch National Road Race Championships
- Dutch Headwind Cycling Championships
- National Road Cycling Championships
