= Weijden =

Weijden is a surname. Notable people with the surname include:

- Bullan Weijden, Swedish actress
- Ruth Weijden, Swedish actress

== See also ==
- Van der Weijden
