= 2006 Dutch National Time Trial Championships – Women's time trial =

Women's time trial
2006 Dutch National Time Trial Championships

Race details
- Dates: 20 June 2006
- Stages: 1
- Distance: 21.3 km (13.2 mi)
- Winning time: 29' 28.02"

Medalists
	Gold	Loes Gunnewijk	(Buitenpoort - Flexpoint Team)
	Silver	Kirsten Wild	(AA Drink Cycling Team)
	Bronze	Iris Slappendel	(Vrienden van het Platteland)

The Women's time trial of the 2006 Dutch National Time Trial Championships cycling event took place on 20 June 2006 in and around Oudenbosch, Netherlands over a 21.3 km long parcours.

== Final results ==
Rank	Rider	Team	Time
1st place, gold medalist(s)	Loes Gunnewijk	Buitenpoort - Flexpoint Team	29' 28.02"
2nd place, silver medalist(s)	Kirsten Wild	AA Drink Cycling Team	+ 27.44"
3rd place, bronze medalist(s)	Iris Slappendel	Vrienden van het Platteland	+ 33.92"
4	Jolanda van Dongen		+ 39.81"
5	Marianne Vos		+ 45.76"
6	Vera Koedooder		+ 48.94"
7	Ellen van Dijk	Vrienden van het Platteland	+ 1' 00.05"
8	Jaike de Graaf		+ 1' 19.65"
9	Adrie Visser		+ 1' 27.21"
10	Daniëlle Bekkering		+ 1' 31.27"
11	Bertine Spijkerman		+ 1' 49.41"
12	Liesbeth Bakker		+ 1' 50.38"
13	Marielle Kerste		+ 2' 08.63"
14	Loes Markerink		+ 2' 10.49"
15	Andrea Bosman		+ 2' 21.36"
16	Gabrielle Rovers		+ 2' 41.37"
17	Debby van den Berg		+ 2' 52.67"
18	Femke Nijhof		+ 2' 53.80"
19	Larissa Drysdale		+ 2' 56.69"
20	Pauline van Bennekom		+ 3' 06.15"
21	Kim van Dijk		+ 3' 07.31"
22	Carola Groeneveld		+ 3' 08.26"
23	Wietske Bol		+ 3' 10.28"
24	Njisk Nauta		+ 3' 12.78"
25	Esther Kortekaas		+ 3' 17.31"
26	Roxane Knetemann		+ 3' 18.63"
27	Mirjam van Dijk		+ 3' 28.75"
28	Marion Bax		+ 3' 34.73"
29	Florien Remmelts		+ 4' 07.45"
30	Marieke de Kort		+ 4' 42.38"
31	Natasja Berkhout		+ 6' 03.09"

Results from cyclingarchives.com and cqranking.com.
