= Jet Jongeling =

Dutch cyclist

Personal information
- Born: 1977 (age 48–49) Netherlands

Cycling career
- Sport: Cycling
- Disciplines: Road, track and cyclo-cross
- Role: Rider

Jet Jongeling (born 1977, Delft) is a Dutch cyclo-cross, road and track racing cyclist. She won the Dutch National Time Trial Championships in 1995. She is the younger sister of Maria Jongeling who won the Dutch National Time Trial the year before.

== Palmares ==
1994
2nd, Dutch National Cyclo-cross Championships
1995
1st, Dutch National Time Trial Championships
2nd, Dutch National Track Championships, Individual pursuit
3rd, Dutch National Track Championships, 500 m time trial
6th, World Road Championships, time trial (junior)
1996
3rd, Dutch National Time Trial Championships
2nd, Dutch National Track Championships, Individual pursuit
2nd, Dutch National Track Championships, 500 m time trial
