= Remco van der Ven =

Dutch bicycle racer

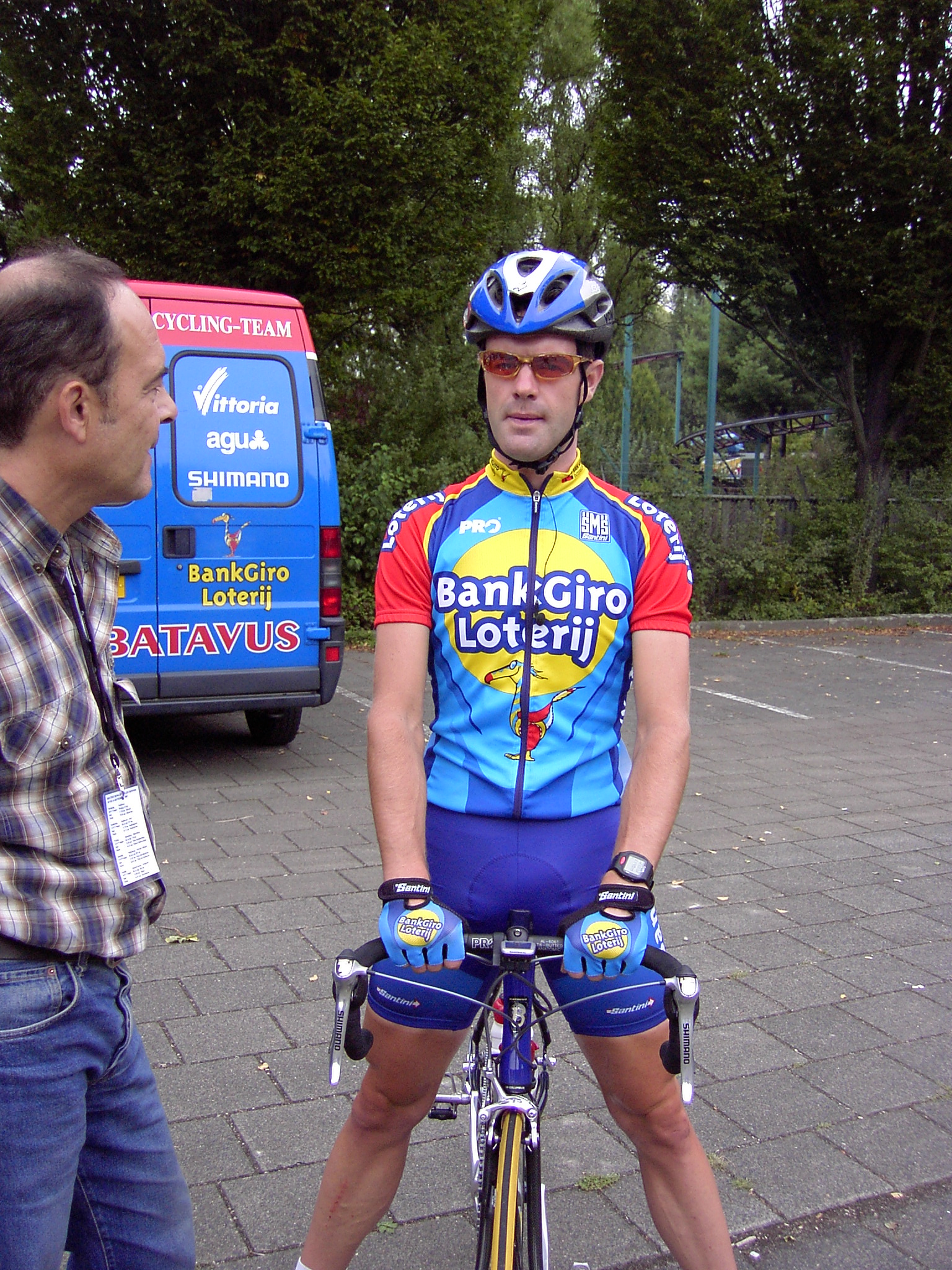
- Remco van der Ven in 2003.

Personal information
- Born: 24 June 1975 (age 51) Montfoort, Netherlands

Cycling career
- Sport: Cycling
- Current team: Retired
- Discipline: Road
- Role: Rider

Amateur team
- 1995–1998: Agu Sport

Professional teams
- 1998–2000: TVM–Farm Frites
- 2001–2004: Batavus–Bankgiroloterij
- 2005: Rabobank Continental Team

Remco van der Ven (born 24 June 1975) is a Dutch former cyclist. He was born in Montfoort and is the brother-in-law of British cyclist Chris Opie.

== Major results ==
1997
1st Overall Olympia's Tour
1st Prologue 3-Länder-Tour
2nd Time trial, National Under-23 Road Championships
3rd Ronde van Overijssel
1998
1st Ronde van Drenthe
2001
2nd Time trial, National Road Championships
3rd Overall Circuit Franco-Belge
3rd Duo Normand (with Bart Voskamp)
5th Scheldeprijs
2002
6th Ronde van Drenthe
2003
3rd Nationale Sluitingsprijs
2004
4th Grote Prijs Jef Scherens
