= 2011 UCI Road World Championships – Men's under-23 time trial =

Men's under-23 time trial
2011 UCI Road World Championships

Race details
- Dates: 19 September 2011
- Stages: 1
- Distance: 35.2 km (21.87 mi)

The Men's under-23 time trial of the 2011 UCI Road World Championships was a cycling event that took place on 19 September 2011 in Copenhagen, Denmark.

== Final classification ==
	Cyclist	Nation		Time
1st place, gold medalist(s)	Luke Durbridge	Australia	in	42 min 17 s
2nd place, silver medalist(s)	Rasmus Christian Quaade	Denmark	+	35 s
3rd place, bronze medalist(s)	Michael Hepburn	Australia		46 s
4	Anton Vorobyev	Russia		58 s
5	Jasper Hamelink	Netherlands		1 min 52 s
6	Jason Christie	New Zealand		2 min 00 s
7	Lluís Mas	Spain		2 min 04 s
8	Tom Dumoulin	Netherlands		2 min 04 s
9	Damien Howson	Australia		2 min 05 s
10	Rudy Molard	France		2 min 09 s
