= Rick Flens =

Dutch cyclist

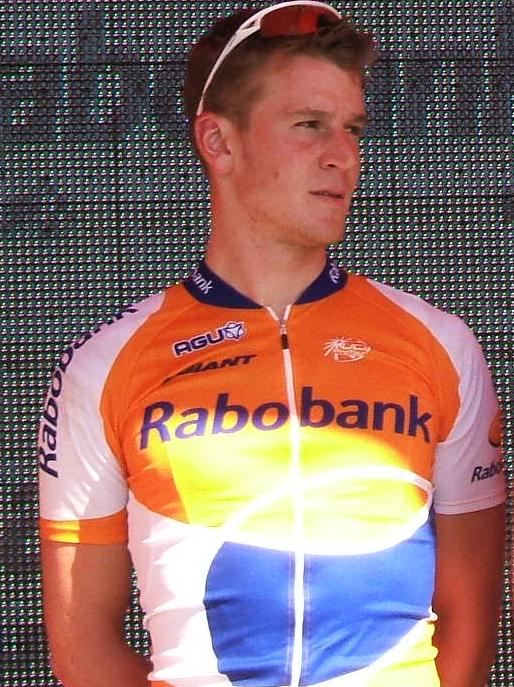
- Flens at the 2009 Tour Down Under

Personal information
- Full name: Rick Flens
- Born: 11 April 1983 (age 43) Zaandam, the Netherlands
- Height: 1.87 m (6 ft 2 in)
- Weight: 82 kg (181 lb)

Cycling career
- Sport: Cycling
- Discipline: Road
- Role: Rider
- Rider type: Domestique

Professional teams
- 2003–2005: Van Vliet–EBH Advocaten–Gazelle
- 2006: Rabobank Continental Team
- 2007–2015: Rabobank

Rick Flens (born 11 April 1983 in Zaandam) is a Dutch former professional road bicycle racer, who competed between 2003 and 2015, for the Van Vliet–EBH Advocaten, Rabobank Continental Team and LottoNL–Jumbo teams.

== Major results ==
2001
1st Time trial, National Junior Road Championships
2002
3rd Time trial, National Under-23 Road Championships
2005
3rd ZLM Tour
6th Overall Olympia's Tour
2006
1st Stage 3 Tour de la Somme
2nd Overall Tour du Poitou-Charentes

1st Stage 4

3rd Overall Olympia's Tour

1st Prologue

5th Omloop van het Houtland
6th Overall Le Triptyque des Monts et Châteaux
2007
1st Stage 5 (ITT) Danmark Rundt
3rd Time trial, National Road Championships
5th Overall Tour of Belgium
2008
6th Overall Three Days of De Panne
2009
3rd Time trial, National Road Championships
2010
2nd Kuurne–Brussels–Kuurne
2011
1st Stage 1 (TTT) Tirreno–Adriatico
8th Overall Three Days of De Panne
2015
2nd Time trial, National Road Championships
