= Maria Jongeling =

Dutch racing cyclist

Personal information
- Born: 19 June 1975 (age 51) Delft, Netherlands

Cycling career
- Sport: Cycling
- Disciplines: Road and track
- Role: Rider

Maria Jongeling (born 19 June 1975 in Delft, Netherlands) is a Dutch road and track racing cyclist. As a junior, she won a gold medal at the Track World Championships in the individual pursuit. She also became three years in a row national track champion in the individual pursuit and won in the 1994 the Dutch National Time Trial Championships. She participated at the UCI Road World Championships in the time trial in 1994 and 1995 She is the older sister of Jet Jongeling, who won the Dutch National Time Trials in 1995.

== Major results ==
1993
1st Track World Championships, Individual pursuit (junior)
1st Dutch National Track Championships, Individual pursuit (elite)
2nd Dutch National Track Championships, Sprint (elite)
2nd Dutch National Track Championships, Points race (elite)

1994
1st, Dutch National Track Championships, Individual pursuit
2nd, Dutch National Track Championships, Points race
1st, Dutch National Time Trial Championships
5th, UCI Road World Championships – Women's time trial

1995
2nd, Dutch National Track Championships, 500 m time trial
1st, Dutch National Track Championships, Individual Pursuit
2nd, Dutch National Time Trial Championships
3rd, Dutch National Road Race Championships
14th, 1995 UCI Road World Championships, Time trial
