= Kenneth Van Rooy =

Belgian cyclist

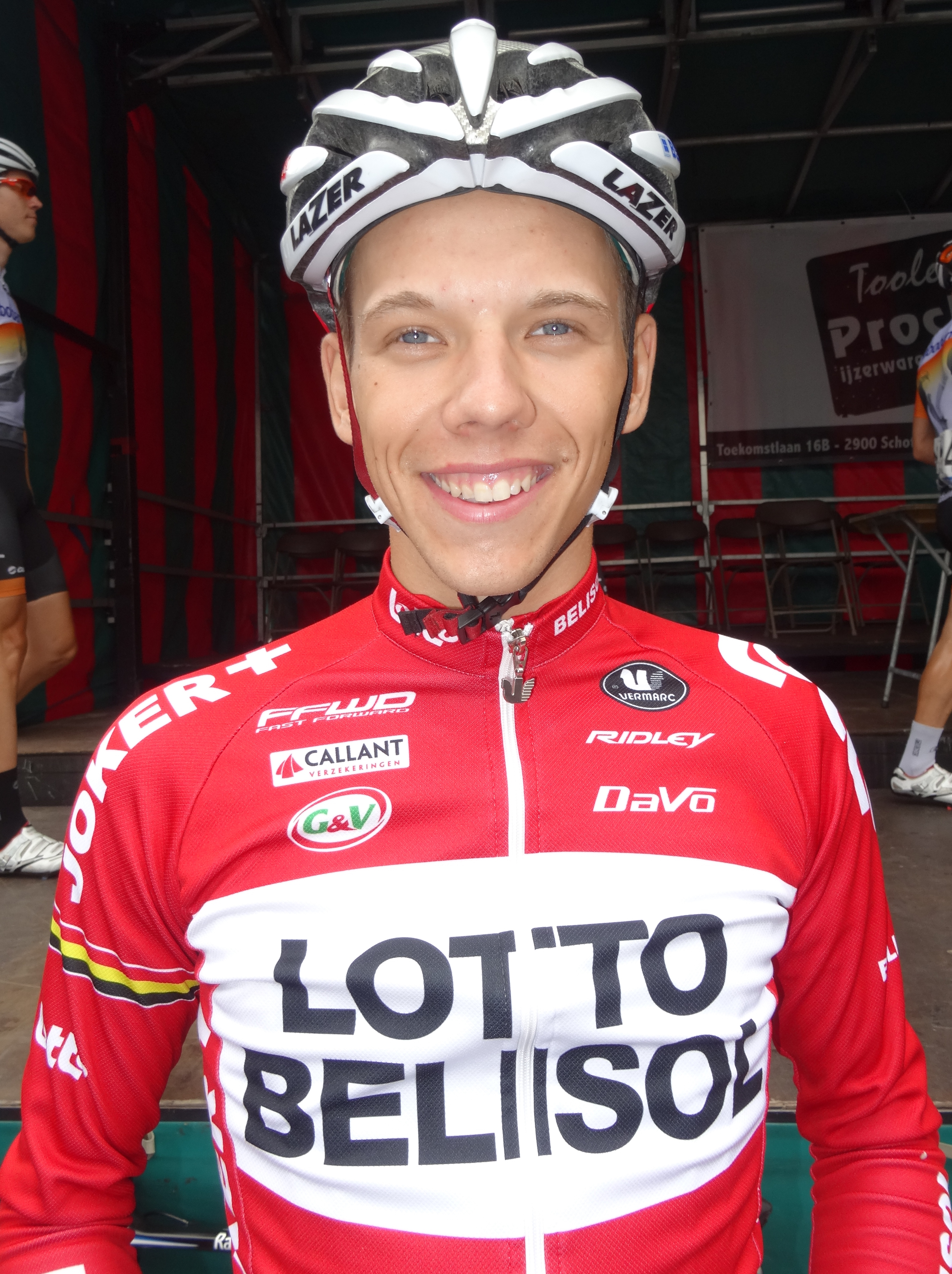
- Van Rooy in 2014.

Personal information
- Full name: Kenneth Van Rooy
- Born: 8 October 1993 (age 33) Turnhout, Belgium
- Height: 1.79 m (5 ft 10 in)
- Weight: 70 kg (154 lb)

Cycling career
- Sport: Cycling
- Current team: Wagner Bazin WB
- Discipline: Road
- Role: Rider

Amateur teams
- 2009–2010: WSC Hand in Hand Baal
- 2011: Neerpelt
- 2012–2015: Lotto–Belisol U23

Professional teams
- 2015: Lotto–Soudal (stagiaire)
- 2016–2022: Topsport Vlaanderen–Baloise
- 2023–: Bingoal WB

Kenneth Van Rooy (born 8 October 1993 in Turnhout) is a Belgian cyclist, who currently rides for UCI ProTeam Wagner Bazin WB.

== Major results ==
2011
1st Stage 3 Liège–La Gleize
2012
5th Overall Carpathia Couriers Paths

1st Young rider classification

2013
10th Grote 1-MeiPrijs
2014
5th Memorial Van Coningsloo
8th Grand Prix Criquielion
10th Antwerpse Havenpijl
2015
1st Tour de Liège
4th Road race, UEC European Under-23 Road Championships
4th Liège–Bastogne–Liège Espoirs
6th Grand Prix Criquielion
7th RideLondon–Surrey Classic
9th Overall Tour de Bretagne

1st Sprints classification

10th Omloop Het Nieuwsblad U23
2018
10th Grote Prijs Marcel Kint
10th Veenendaal–Veenendaal Classic
2019
2nd Internationale Wielertrofee Jong Maar Moedig
5th Grand Prix Criquielion
8th Overall Tour de Wallonie
2020
2nd Overall Tour of Antalya

1st Points classification

2021
7th Grand Prix de Denain
7th Eurométropole Tour
10th Heistse Pijl
2022
3rd Schaal Sels
4th Primus Classic
5th Druivenkoers Overijse
9th Heistse Pijl
2023
10th Van Merksteijn Fences Classic
