= David Montgomery (cyclist) =

Irish cyclist (born 1995)

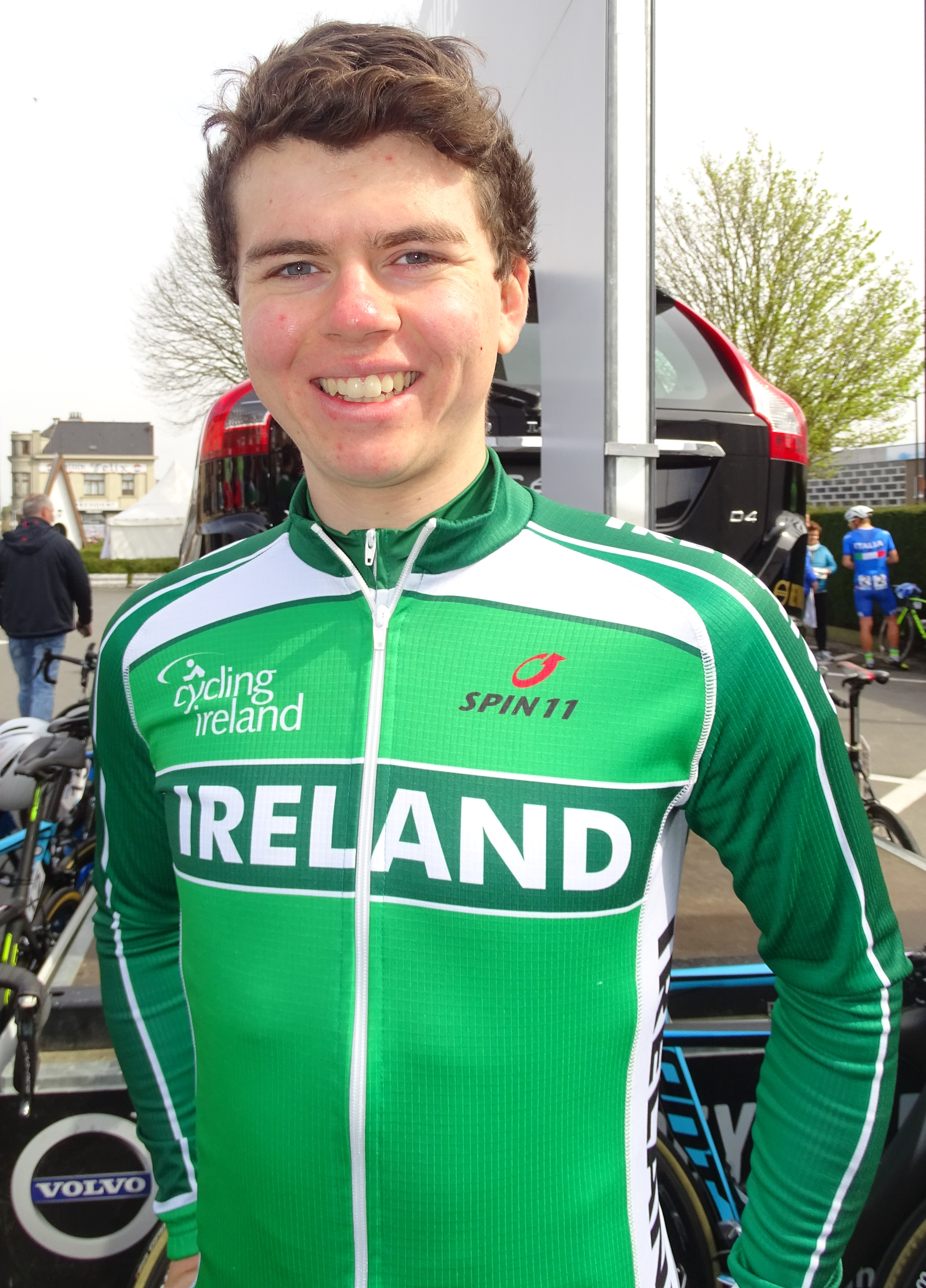

Personal information
- Born: 27 June 1995 (age 31) Belfast, Northern Ireland

Cycling career
- Sport: Cycling
- Current team: Spellman Dublin Port Cycling Team
- Disciplines: Cyclo-cross; Road; Mountain biking
- Role: Rider

Amateur teams
- 2017: ChainReaction Cycles
- 2021: Dromara CC
- 2022–: Spellman Dublin Port Cycling Team

Professional teams
- 2015: Team3M
- 2016: An Post–Chain Reaction

David Montgomery (born 27 June 1995) is an Irish road and cyclo-cross cyclist, who rides for club team Spellman Dublin Port Cycling Team. He competed in the men's under-23 event at the 2016 UCI Cyclo-cross World Championships in Heusden-Zolder.

== Major results ==
=== Cyclo-cross ===
2013–2014
2nd National Under-23 Championships
2014–2015
1st National Championships
2015–2016
2nd National Championships
2018–2019
2nd National Championships

=== Mountain bike ===
2014
1st Cross-country, National Under-23 Championships
2015
2nd Cross-country, National Championships
2017
3rd Cross-country, National Championships
2019
2nd Cross-country, National Championships
2022
2nd Cross-country, National Championships

=== Road ===
2019
2nd Overall Tour of the North
