= Elliott Porter =

British cyclist

Personal information
- Born: 31 December 1991 (age 34) Leicester
- Height: 6 ft 3 in (191 cm)

Cycling career
- Sport: Cycling
- Discipline: Road / Track
- Role: Rider
- Rider type: TT / Climber

Amateur teams
- 2011: London Dynamo
- 2012: Team Corridori

Professional teams
- 2013–2014: Rapha Condor-JLT
- 2015: Team 3M
- 2016-2017: Neon-Velo

Elliott Porter (born 31 December 1991) is a British racing cyclist.

== Palmares ==
2011
1st Surrey League Individual Rider Overall Ranking
2012
6th, Bec CC Road Race
7th, U23 National Time Trial Championships
9th, London Dynamo Summer Road Race
2013
2nd, Peter Young Memorial Road Race
6th, Youth Classification, An Post Ras
8th, London Phoenix Road Race
9th, British National U23 Time Trial Championships
2014
1st, One Day in Dorset
1st, Prologue (TTT), Mzansi Tour
1st, John and Dulcie Walker Trophy
2nd, Mountains Classification, Tour de Korea
7th, Overall, SERRL Spring Stage Race

1st, Stage 1 (ITT)

2016
15th Tour of the Resiviour stage 2
16th Tour of the Resiviour GC
13th Wiltshire GP
13th Beaumont
24th British National Road Race Championships
1st Suir Valley 3 day stage race stage 4
5th Suir Valley 3 day stage race GC
2017
13th An Post Ras GC
2nd Beachy Head Classic
10th Tour of the Resiviour GC
