= 2010 Dutch National Time Trial Championships – Women's time trial =

Women's time trial
2011 Dutch National Time Trial Championships

Race details
- Dates: 23 June 2010
- Stages: 1
- Distance: 24.7 km (15.35 mi)
- Winning time: 33' 33"

Results
	Winner	Marianne Vos	(Nederland Bloeit)
	Second	Regina Bruins	(Cervélo Test Team)
	Third	Kirsten Wild	(Cervélo Test Team)

The Women's time trial of the 2010 Dutch National Time Trial Championships cycling event took place on 23 June 2010 in and around Oudenbosch, Netherlands.

== Final classification ==
Rank	Rider	Team	Age	Time
1st place, gold medalist(s)	Marianne Vos	ARC	23	33" 33'
2nd place, silver medalist(s)	Regina Bruins	CWT	24	+ 13'
3rd place, bronze medalist(s)	Kirsten Wild	CWT	28	+ 16'
4	Annemiek van Vleuten	ARC	28	+ 24'
5	Iris Slappendel	CWT	25	+ 40'
6	Vera Koedooder	BAT	27	+ 53'
7	Ellen van Dijk	TCW	23	+ 58'
8	Loes Gunnewijk	ARC	30	+ 2" 02'
9	Marijn de Vries	LNL	32	+ 2" 17'
10	Chantal Blaak	LNL	21	+ 2" 21'
11	Judith Visser		25	+ 2" 39'
12	Anne de Wildt	LNL	21	+ 2" 40'
13	Amy Pieters		19	+ 2" 48'
14	Natalie van Gogh		36	+ 2" 53'
15	Lotte van Hoek		19	+ 3" 07'
16	Nynke Troelstra		24	+ 3" 09'
17	Mariëlle Kerste		24	+ 3" 31'
18	Adrie Visser	TCW	27	+ 3" 40'
19	Marieke den Otter		20	+ 3" 41'
20	Els Visser		28	+ 3" 55'
21	Judith Bloem		20	+ 4" 15'
22	Heleen van Vliet	LNL	28	+ 4" 19'
23	Amanda Bongaards		22	+ 4" 23'
24	Tessa van Nieuwpoort		19	+ 4" 23'
25	Winanda Spoor		19	+ 4" 24'
26	Melissa Slewe		21	+ 4" 52'
27	Maartje Zwaan		22	+ 5" 20'
28	Marjolein Claessen		19	+ 5" 22'
29	Esther Aarts (cycling)		30	+ 5" 22
30	Irene Van Lith		19	+ 9" 18'

Results from uci.ch.
