= Jaap ten Kortenaar =

Dutch cyclist (born 1964)

Personal information
- Full name: Jacob Christiaan "Jaap" ten Kortenaar
- Born: 31 January 1964 Zoetermeer, Netherlands
- Height: 193 cm (6 ft 4 in)
- Weight: 80 kg (176 lb)

Cycling career
- Sport: Cycling
- Discipline: Road cycling

Jacob Christiaan "Jaap" ten Kortenaar (born 31 January 1964) is a cyclist from the Netherlands. He competed in the men's team time trial at the 1992 Summer Olympics, finishing 9th. He finished second and third at the Dutch National Time Trial Championships in respectively 1993 and 1994.

Jaap is the brother of speed skater Marnix ten Kortenaar.

== See also ==
- List of Dutch Olympic cyclists
