= Jasper Hamelink =

Dutch cyclist (born 1990)

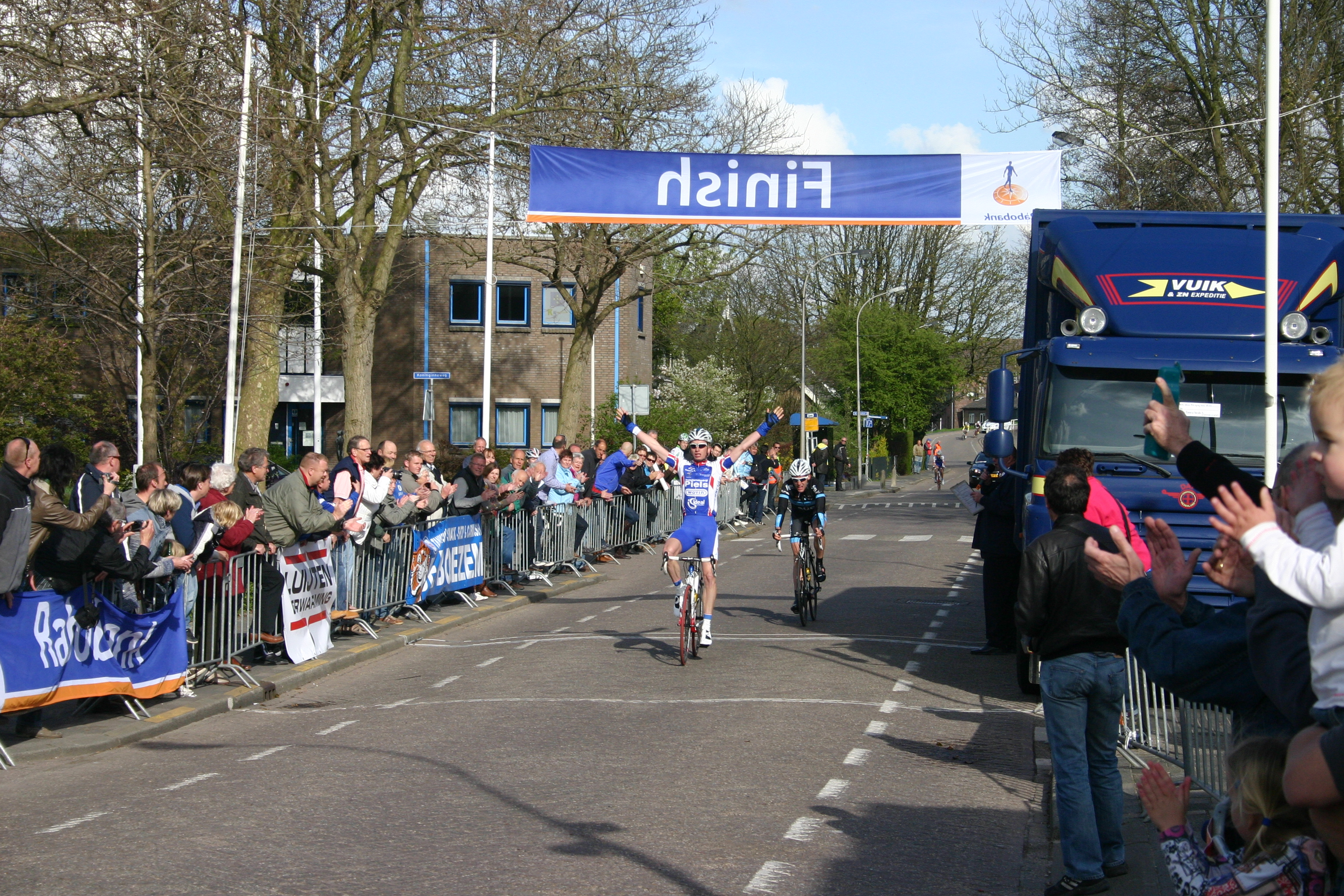
- Hamelink in 2012

Personal information
- Full name: Jasper Hamelink
- Born: 12 January 1990 (age 36) Zwolle, Netherlands

Cycling career
- Sport: Cycling
- Current team: Retired
- Discipline: Road
- Role: Rider

Amateur teams
- 2010: Line Lloyd Footwear
- 2019–2020: Sensa–Kanjers voor Kanjers

Professional teams
- 2011–2014: Cycling Team Jo Piels
- 2012: Vacansoleil–DCM (stagiaire)
- 2015–2018: Metec–TKH

Jasper Hamelink (born 12 January 1990) is a Dutch former racing cyclist, who rode professionally between 2011 and 2018 for the Cycling Team Jo Piels and Metec–TKH teams. He rode at the 2013 UCI Road World Championships.

== Major results ==
2010
2nd Time trial, National Under-23 Road Championships
2011
1st Stage 3 (ITT) Tour de Berlin
2nd Time trial, National Under-23 Road Championships
5th Time trial, UCI Under-23 Road World Championships
8th Overall Olympia's Tour
2012
3rd Ronde van Limburg
4th Overall Carpathia Couriers Paths
8th Time trial, UEC European Under-23 Road Championships
9th Overall Olympia's Tour
9th Ster van Zwolle
2014
1st Stage 2 (TTT) Olympia's Tour
2015
6th Overall Olympia's Tour
9th Overall Ronde de l'Oise
2016
1st Mountains classification Tour du Loir-et-Cher
3rd Overall Course de Solidarność et des Champions Olympiques

1st Stage 2

5th Overall Szlakiem Grodów Piastowskich
7th Overall Bałtyk–Karkonosze Tour
9th Arno Wallaard Memorial
2017
10th Overall Course de Solidarność et des Champions Olympiques
10th Druivenkoers Overijse
2018
10th Ronde van Midden-Nederland
