= List of protected heritage sites in Lierneux =

This table shows an overview of the protected heritage sites in the Walloon town Lierneux. This list is part of Belgium's national heritage. Lierneux

Object	Year/architect	Town/section	Address	Coordinates	Number^{?}	Image
Farm, except agricultural outbuildings ^{(nl)} ^{(fr)}		Lierneux	n° 5, Brux	50.290440°N 5.821895°E	63045-CLT-0003-01 Info	
House ^{(nl)} ^{(fr)}		Lierneux	rue du Centre n° 90	50.283282°N 5.793475°E	63045-CLT-0004-01 Info	Huis
Houses ^{(nl)} ^{(fr)}		Lierneux	rue du Centre n° 88	50.283461°N 5.793661°E	63045-CLT-0005-01 Info	
Grande Ferme farmhouse with yard, garden and boundary wall ^{(nl)} ^{(fr)}		Lierneux	44-45	50.272617°N 5.814549°E	63045-CLT-0007-01 Info	
Farmhouse ^{(nl)} ^{(fr)}		Lierneux	n°23, Jevigné	50.294539°N 5.766922°E	63045-CLT-0008-01 Info	
Chapels and Stations of the Cross attributes along the path of yearly procession ^{(nl)} ^{(fr)}		Lierneux	chemin de croix d'Arbrefontaine	50.304061°N 5.837394°E	63045-CLT-0012-01 Info	
Notre-Dame Church: tower and old mechanical clock ^{(nl)} ^{(fr)}		Lierneux	Bra	50.324126°N 5.732185°E	63045-CLT-0013-01 Info	Kerk Notre-Dame: toren en oud mechaniek uurwerk
"Le Lorgnon" Farmhouse ^{(nl)} ^{(fr)}		Lierneux		50.294588°N 5.766266°E	63045-CLT-0015-01 Info	
Oak tree ^{(nl)} ^{(fr)}		Lierneux	Sur les Thiers 21, Bra-sur-Lienne	50.344777°N 5.727480°E	63045-CLT-0019-01 Info	

== See also ==
- List of protected heritage sites in Liège (province)
