= Marcel Duijn =

Dutch cyclist

Personal information
- Born: 12 May 1977 (age 49) Heemskerk, Netherlands

Cycling career
- Sport: Cycling
- Current team: Retired
- Discipline: Road
- Role: Rider

Professional teams
- 2000–2002: Rabobank
- 2003: Van Hemert Groep

Marcel Duijn (born 12 May 1977) is a Dutch former cyclist, who competed as a professional from 2000 to 2002 with Rabobank. He rode in the 2000 Giro d'Italia and the 2001 Paris–Roubaix. In 1999, he won the Gerrie Knetemann Trofee for the best under-23 Dutch cyclist.

== Major results ==
1997
2nd Overall Tour de Liège

1st Stage 4

1998
National Under-23 Road Championships

1st Time trial
2nd Road race

1st Overall Le Triptyque des Monts et Châteaux

1st Stage 2

1st Tour Beneden-Maas
2nd Overall Olympia's Tour
3rd Ronde van Overijssel
1999
1st Overall Olympia's Tour

1st Stage 10 (ITT)

1st Circuit de Wallonie
4th Overall Le Triptyque des Monts et Châteaux
2000
4th Time trial, National Road Championships
6th Veenendaal–Veenendaal
10th Le Samyn
2001
10th Overall Tour de Luxembourg
2002
4th Time trial, National Road Championships
5th Overall Niedersachsen-Rundfahrt
