= 2011 Dutch National Time Trial Championships – Women's time trial =

Women's time trial
2011 Dutch National Time Trial Championships

Race details
- Dates: 22 June 2011
- Stages: 1
- Distance: 23.2 km (14.42 mi)
- Winning time: 30' 39"

Medalists
	Gold	Marianne Vos	(Nederland Bloeit)
	Silver	Ellen van Dijk	(HTC–Highroad Women)
	Bronze	Loes Gunnewijk	(Nederland Bloeit)

NOS Report RTV-Noord Report

The Women's time trial of the 2011 Dutch National Time Trial Championships cycling event took place on 22 June 2011 in and around Veendam, Netherlands.

Marianne Vos became for the second time in her career Dutch National Time Trial Champion. She finished 6 seconds ahead of Ellen van Dijk and 64 seconds of Loes Gunnewijk.

== Final classification ==
Rank	Rider	Team	Age	Time
1st place, gold medalist(s)	Marianne Vos	Nederland Bloeit	24	30’ 39"
2nd place, silver medalist(s)	Ellen van Dijk	HTC–Highroad Women	24	+ 6"
3rd place, bronze medalist(s)	Loes Gunnewijk	Nederland Bloeit	31	+ 1’ 04"
4	Iris Slappendel	Garmin–Cervélo	26	+ 1’ 07"
5	Kirsten Wild	AA Drink–leontien.nl	29	+ 1’ 19"
6	Vera Koedooder	Team Specialized–DPD pakket service	28	+ 1’ 43"
7	Lucinda Brand	AA Drink–leontien.nl	22	+ 1’ 49"
8	Roxane Knetemann	Batavus Ladies Cycling Team	24	+ 2’ 22"
9	Irene van den Broek	AA Drink–leontien.nl	31	+ 2’ 29"
10	Winanda Spoor	Dolmans Landscaping Team	20	+ 2’ 37"
11	Marijn de Vries	AA Drink–leontien.nl	33	+ 2’ 39"
12	Rixt Meijer	Cycling Team People's Trust–Noordwesthoek	29	+ 2’ 41"
13	Amy Pieters	Skil-Koga	20	+ 2’ 54"
14	Mathilde Matthysse	Rabo Lady Force	31	+ 2’ 56"
15	Esra Tromp	Skil–Koga	21	+ 3’ 01"
16	Natalie van Gogh	Team Specialized–DPD pakket service	37	+ 3’ 14"
17	Janneke Ensing	Dolmans Landscaping Team	25	+ 3’ 14"
18	Sigrid Kuizenga	RC Jan van Arckel	28	+ 3’ 16"
19	Larissa Drysdale	–	40	+ 3’ 19"
20	Annelies Visser	Batavus Ladies Cycling Team	19	+ 3’ 25"
21	Maria Sterk	Cycling Team People's Trust–Noordwesthoek	32	+ 3’ 37"
22	Birgit Lavrijssen	Dolmans Landscaping Team	20	+ 3’ 42"
23	Maaike Hoek	SRAM–W.V. Eemland	20	+ 3’ 47"
24	Olga Velzen	Swabo Ladies	35	+ 3’ 54"
25	Marissa Otten	Dolmans Landscaping Team	22	+ 4’ 12"
26	Henriette Woering	SRAM–W.V. Eemland	19	+ 4’ 16"
27	Aafke Eshuis	Team Specialized–DPD pakket service	24	+ 4’ 25"
28	Hanneke Mulder	Hepro Kozijnen–NWV Groningen	23	+ 5’ 16"
29	Charlotte Lenting	Moving Ladies	19	+ 5’ 27"
30	Judith Bloem	RC Jan van Arckel	21	+ 5’ 28"
31	Danielle Meijering	–	19	+ 5’ 56"
32	Britt Jansen	Team Specialized–DPD pakket service	20	+ 6’ 18"
33	Alie Gercama	Dolmans Landscaping Team	21	+ 6’ 20"
34	Ilona Den Hartog	Restore Cycling Ladies	19	+ 6’ 22"
35	Lisanne Ottema	Hepro Kozijnen–NWV Groningen	21	+ 6’ 23"
36	Erika BRoekema	Hepro Kozijnen–NWV Groningen	28	+ 8’ 21"

Results from uci.ch.
