= Liv Racing TeqFind =

Former Dutch cycling team (2005–2023)

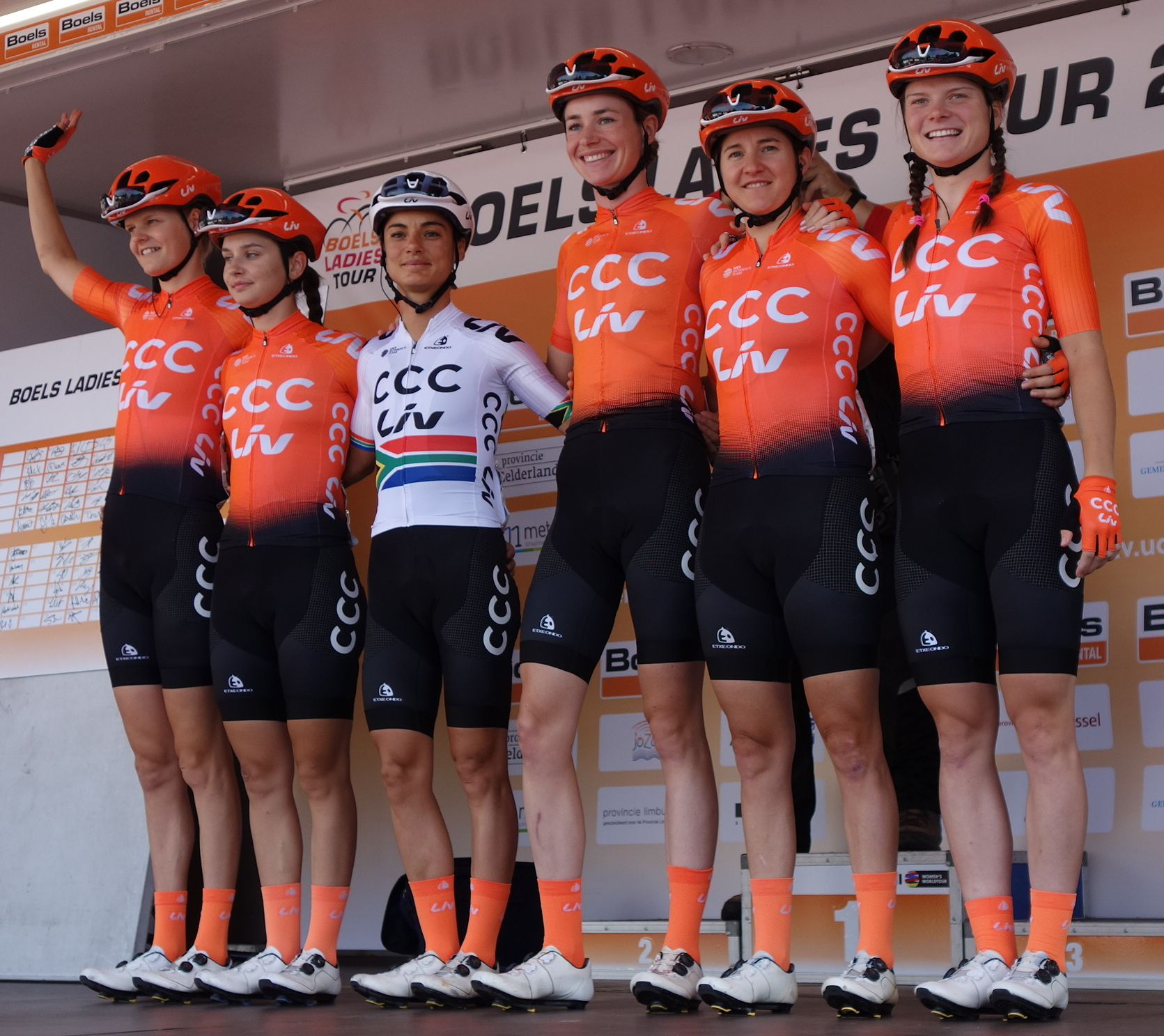
- Team presentation before the start of the first stage of the 2019 Boels Ladies Tour

Team information
- UCI code: DSB (2005–2008); ARC (2009–2010); NLB (2011); RBW (2012–2016); WM3 (2017); WAD (2018); CCC (2019–2020); LIV (2021–2023)
- Registered: Netherlands (2005–2019, 2021–2023); Poland (2020)
- Founded: 2005
- Disbanded: 2023 (merged with Team Jayco–AlUla)
- Discipline: Road
- Status: UCI Women's Team (2007–2019); UCI Women's WorldTeam (2020–present)
- Bicycles: Colnago (2005–2008); Giant (2009–2016); Ridley (2017–2018); Liv (2019–2023)
- Website: Team home page

Key personnel
- General manager: Eric van den Boom
- Team managers: Lars Boom; Hugo Brenders

Team name history
- 2005 2006 2007–2008 2009 2010–2011 2012 2012 2013 2014–2016 2017 2017 2018 2019–2020 2021 2022 2023: DSB Bank; DSB Bank–Ballast Nedam; DSB–Bank; DSB Bank–LTO; Nederland Bloeit; Stichting Rabo Women Cycling Team; Rabobank Women Cycling Team; Rabobank–Liv Giant; Rabo–Liv Women Cycling Team; Fortitude Pro Cycling (Note: The team was known as Fortitude Pro Cycling, prior to bringing WM3 Energy on board as main sponsor); WM3 Pro Cycling; WaowDeals Pro Cycling; CCC Liv Team; Liv Racing; Liv Racing–Xstra; Liv Racing TeqFind

Liv Racing TeqFind (UCI code: LIV) was a women's professional cycling team, based in the Netherlands. The title sponsor was Liv, a sub-brand of Taiwanese bicycle manufacturer Giant Bicycles. The team's directeur sportif was Eric van den Boom. Riders for Liv Racing competed in the UCI Women's World Tour and other Elite Women's Cycling events throughout the world. At the end of the 2023 season, the team was merged with Jayco-AlUla to form Liv AlUla Jayco.

== History of the team ==
=== 2012 ===
The team's first win of the season came in the Ronde van Drenthe where Marianne Vos claimed victory. The team's first overall General classification win came at the Festival Luxembourgeois du cyclisme féminin Elsy Jacobs, again being won by Vos, along with a stage; Annemiek van Vleuten also won the prologue and a stage. Vos went on to win five stages of the 2012 Giro d'Italia Femminile, as well as the General classification. Vos followed this by winning the General classification of the Tour Féminin en Limousin. Vos continued her strong run of wins claiming the 2012 Olympic Games road race in London. The final wins for the team came at the Holland Ladies Tour where Vos won the General classification and took two stage wins. Vos later won the 2012 UCI World Championship road race.

=== 2013 ===
Marianne Vos opened the team's account securing victory in the 2013 UCI Cyclo-cross World Championship. The team's first road win of the season came at the Drentse 8 van Dwingeloo, with Vos claiming victory. Vos went on to win the Ronde van Drenthe and Tour of Flanders. Like the previous season the first overall General classification win came at the Festival Luxembourgeois du cyclisme féminin Elsy Jacobs, with Vos winning the General classification, Points classification and taking a stage win. Like the previous year, Annemiek van Vleuten won the opening prologue. Vos continued her winning streak in one day races taking out wins in the Rabobank 7-Dorpenomloop Aalburg and Durango-Durango Emakumeen Saria. Vos failed to retain her 2013 Giro title, losing to Mara Abbott, but did claim the Points classification and three stages. Vos also claimed overall victory in Trophée d'Or Féminin.

=== 2014 ===
The 2014 season marked a different start to the season for the team. Marianne Vos started her road season late, leaving the team to support other riders in the opening races of the year. Lucinda Brand won the team's first General classification of the year at the Energiewacht Tour. Pauline Ferrand-Prévot won the La Flèche Wallonne Féminine with Anna van der Breggen claiming victory at the Dwars door de Westhoek. Van der Breggen then claimed overall victory at the Festival Luxembourgeois du cyclisme féminin Elsy Jacobs with Vos winning the Points classification and Ferrand-Prévot taking both the Mountains and Young rider classifications. Vos then claimed overall victory at the inaugural Women's Tour in Great Britain. The team won further races at the Emakumeen Euskal Bira for Ferrand-Prevot and the 2014 Giro d'Italia Femminile for Vos. Vos followed this up by winning the inaugural La Course by Le Tour de France.

=== 2015 ===
In January the team scored first and third in the UCI World Cyclo-cross championships, with Pauline Ferrand-Prévot and Marianne Vos respectively. This was the year that saw Vos in recovery mode taking most of the year off due to injury. In the first European road race of the season, the Omloop het Nieuwsblad, the team rode very strongly. With 30 kilometres (19 miles) to go, Anna van der Breggen escaped together with Ellen van Dijk (Boels–Dolmans) from a front group of 15 riders on the Molenberg. The duo extended their advantage over the cobbled sections that followed, holding off the chase group to the line, where van der Breggen won the two-up sprint.

In December 2015 Rabobank announced that it would end its sponsorship of professional sport at the end of 2016, forcing the team to find a new sponsor.

=== 2016 ===
In November 2016 the team announced that it would be known as WM3 Energie in 2017, signing a five-year sponsorship deal with WM3 Energie, a company based in the Netherlands. The team replaced Rabobank-Liv Woman Cycling Team, whose sponsorship ceased at the end of 2016.

Marianne Vos led the roster that included Anouska Koster, Katarzyna Niewiadoma, Valentina Scandolara, Yara Kastelijn, Jeanne Korevaar, Moniek Tenniglo, Rotem Gafinovitz, Anna Plichta, Lauren Kitchen, and Riejanne Markus.

=== 2017 ===
Marianne Vos started the year riding in Cyclo-Cross competitions winning eight of the twelve races she entered. She won the 2017 Dutch National Cyclo-cross Championships for the sixth time. She placed second at the 2017 UCI Cyclo-cross World Championships in Bieles, Luxembourg on January 28.

In October, the team announced that WaowDeals would join the team as naming-sponsor, with WM3 remaining with the team as a secondary sponsor after agreeing a five-year deal with the team in the winter of 2016.

== Team roster ==
As of 14 August 2023.

Rider	Date of birth
Caroline Andersson (SWE)	29 July 2001 (age 25)
Rachele Barbieri (ITA)	21 February 1997 (age 29)
Eva Buurman (NED)	7 September 1994 (age 31)
Thalita De Jong (NED)	6 November 1993 (age 32)
Valerie Demey (BEL)	17 January 1994 (age 32)
Mavi Garcia (ESP)	2 January 1984 (age 42)
Marta Jaskulska (POL)	25 March 2000 (age 26)
Jeanne Korevaar (NED)	24 September 1996 (age 29)

Rider	Date of birth
Ayesha McGowan (USA)	2 April 1987 (age 39)
Tereza Neumanova (CZE)	9 August 1998 (age 28)
Katia Ragusa (ITA)	19 May 1997 (age 29)
Silke Smulders (NED)	1 April 2001 (age 25)
Sabrina Stultiens (NED)	8 July 1993 (age 33)
Quinty Ton (NED)	4 August 1998 (age 28)
Amber Van Der Hulst (NED)	21 September 1999 (age 26)

== National, continental, world and Olympic champions ==
2006
World Road Race, Marianne Vos
World Cyclo-cross, Marianne Vos
Dutch Road Race, Marianne Vos
European U23 Road Race, Marianne Vos
2007
Dutch Track (Points race), Marianne Vos
Dutch Track (Scratch race), Marianne Vos
Belgian Road Race, Ludivine Henrion
2008
Olympic Track (Points race), Marianne Vos
World Track (Points race), Marianne Vos
Dutch Road Race, Marianne Vos
Belgian Time Trial, Liesbet De Vocht
2009
World Cyclo-cross, Marianne Vos
Dutch Road Race, Marianne Vos
2010
World Cyclo-cross, Marianne Vos
Dutch Time Trial, Marianne Vos
Belgian Road Race, Liesbet De Vocht
Dutch Road Race, Loes Gunnewijk
2011
World Cyclo-cross, Marianne Vos
Track Cycling World (Scratch race), Marianne Vos
Dutch Cyclo-cross, Marianne Vos
Dutch Time Trial, Marianne Vos
Dutch Road Race, Marianne Vos
2012
Olympic Road Race, Marianne Vos
World Road Race, Marianne Vos
Belgian Time Trial, Liesbet De Vocht
Dutch Track (Madison), Marianne Vos
Dutch Track (Madison), Roxane Knetemann

2013
World Cyclo-cross, Marianne Vos
Dutch Cyclo-cross, Marianne Vos
French Time Trial, Pauline Ferrand-Prévot
Dutch Road Race, Lucinda Brand
Belgian Road, Liesbet De Vocht
Swiss U23 XC, Jolanda Neff
French U23 XC, Pauline Ferrand-Prévot
Belgian Time Trial, Liesbet De Vocht
World U23 XC, Jolanda Neff
World Road Race, Marianne Vos
2014
French Cyclo-cross, Pauline Ferrand-Prévot
Dutch Cyclo-cross, Marianne Vos
World Cyclo-cross, Marianne Vos
European U23 XC, Pauline Ferrand-Prévot
Dutch Time Trial, Annemiek van Vleuten
French Time Trial, Pauline Ferrand-Prévot
French Road Race, Pauline Ferrand-Prévot
Dutch Road Race, Iris Slappendel
European U23 Road Race, Sabrina Stultiens
French MTB, Pauline Ferrand-Prévot
World Road Race, Pauline Ferrand-Prévot
European U23 Cyclo-cross, Sabrina Stultiens
German Track (Omnium), Anna Knauer
2015
Australian Time Trial, Shara Gillow
French Cyclo-cross, Pauline Ferrand-Prévot
Dutch Cyclo-cross, Marianne Vos
World Cyclo-cross, Pauline Ferrand-Prévot
German Track (Points race), Anna Knauer
Dutch Time Trial, Anna Van der Breggen
Dutch Road Race, Lucinda Brand
French Road Race, Pauline Ferrand-Prévot
European U23 Road Race, Katarzyna Niewiadoma
French MTB, Pauline Ferrand-Prévot
World MTB (XCO), Pauline Ferrand-Prévot
World MTB (Team relay XC), Pauline Ferrand-Prévot
German Track (Omnium), Anna Knauer
2016
Dutch Cyclo-cross, Thalita de Jong
World Cyclo-cross, Thalita de Jong
Dutch Road Race, Anouska Koster
Poland Time Trial, Katarzyna Niewiadoma
Poland Road Race, Katarzyna Niewiadoma
European Road Race, Anna Van der Breggen
Olympic Road Race, Anna Van der Breggen
2017
Dutch Cyclo-cross, Marianne Vos
European Road Race, Marianne Vos
2019
South Africa Road Race, Ashleigh Moolman
Africa Continental Time Trial, Ashleigh Moolman
2020
South Africa Time Trial, Ashleigh Moolman
2021
Belgian Time Trial, Lotte Kopecky
Belgian Road Race, Lotte Kopecky
Canadian Time Trial, Alison Jackson
Canadian Road Race, Alison Jackson
World Track (Points race), Lotte Kopecky
European Mountainbike (Beachrace), Pauliena Rooijakkers
2022
Czech Road Race, Tereza Neumanova

== Team Ranking ==
Season	2006	2007	2008	2009	2010	2011	2012	2013	2014	2015
Women's World Cup	–	–	–	2nd (394 P)	3rd (488 P)	1st (686 P)	1st (606 P)	1st (682 P)	1st (1515 P)	1st (1204 P)
UCI Women's Ranking	–	2nd	2nd	3rd (1,528.35 P)	2nd (2,099.5 P)	1st (2,594 P)	2nd (1,948.75 P)	1st (2,879 P)	1st (3,422.75 P)	1st (3,120.5 P)
