= Jolanda van Dongen =

Dutch cyclist (born 1966)

Personal information
- Born: 30 August 1966 (age 60) Netherlands

Cycling career
- Sport: Cycling
- Role: Rider (road)
- Rider type: Endurance

Professional teams
- 1989: Piet de Wit
- 2004: Team Tom van Bemmelen Sports
- 2006: @Work Cycling Team

Jolanda van Dongen (born 30 August 1966 in Roosendaal) is a Dutch road racing cyclist. She became national time trial champion in 2003. She finished second at the national road championships in 1987.
