= Bob Schoonbroodt =

Dutch cyclist (born 1991)

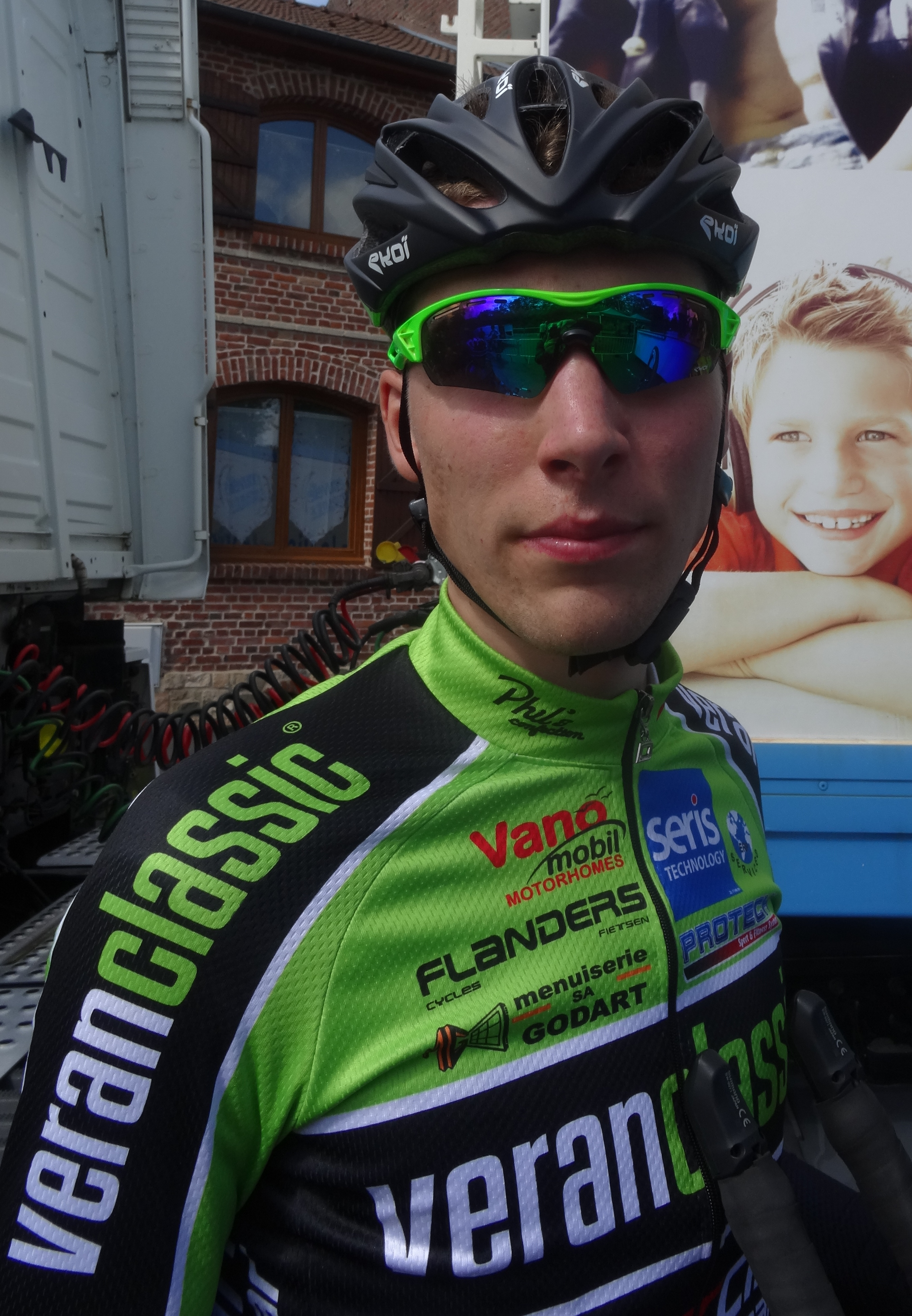
- Schoonbroodt in 2014

Personal information
- Full name: Bob Schoonbroodt
- Born: 12 February 1991 (age 35) Hoensbroek, Netherlands
- Height: 1.93 m (6 ft 4 in)
- Weight: 78 kg (172 lb)

Cycling career
- Sport: Cycling
- Current team: Retired
- Discipline: Road
- Role: Rider

Amateur teams
- 2009: WV De Jonge Renner
- 2014: TWC Maaslandster–Zuid Limburg

Professional teams
- 2010–2013: Van Vliet–EBH Elshof
- 2014: Veranclassic–Doltcini
- 2015: Parkhotel Valkenburg Continental Team
- 2016: Team3M

Bob Schoonbroodt (born 12 February 1991) is a Dutch former racing cyclist. He rode at the 2013 UCI Road World Championships.

== Major results ==
2009
1st Time trial, National Junior Road Championships
1st Omloop Het Nieuwsblad Juniors
4th Overall Liège–La Gleize
9th Overall Grand Prix Rüebliland
2012
2nd Time trial, National Under-23 Road Championships
2014
6th Overall Tour of Taihu Lake

1st Stage 8

2015
2nd Overall Olympia's Tour
2nd GP Viborg
2016
5th Time trial, National Road Championships
