= Remmert Wielinga =

Dutch cyclist

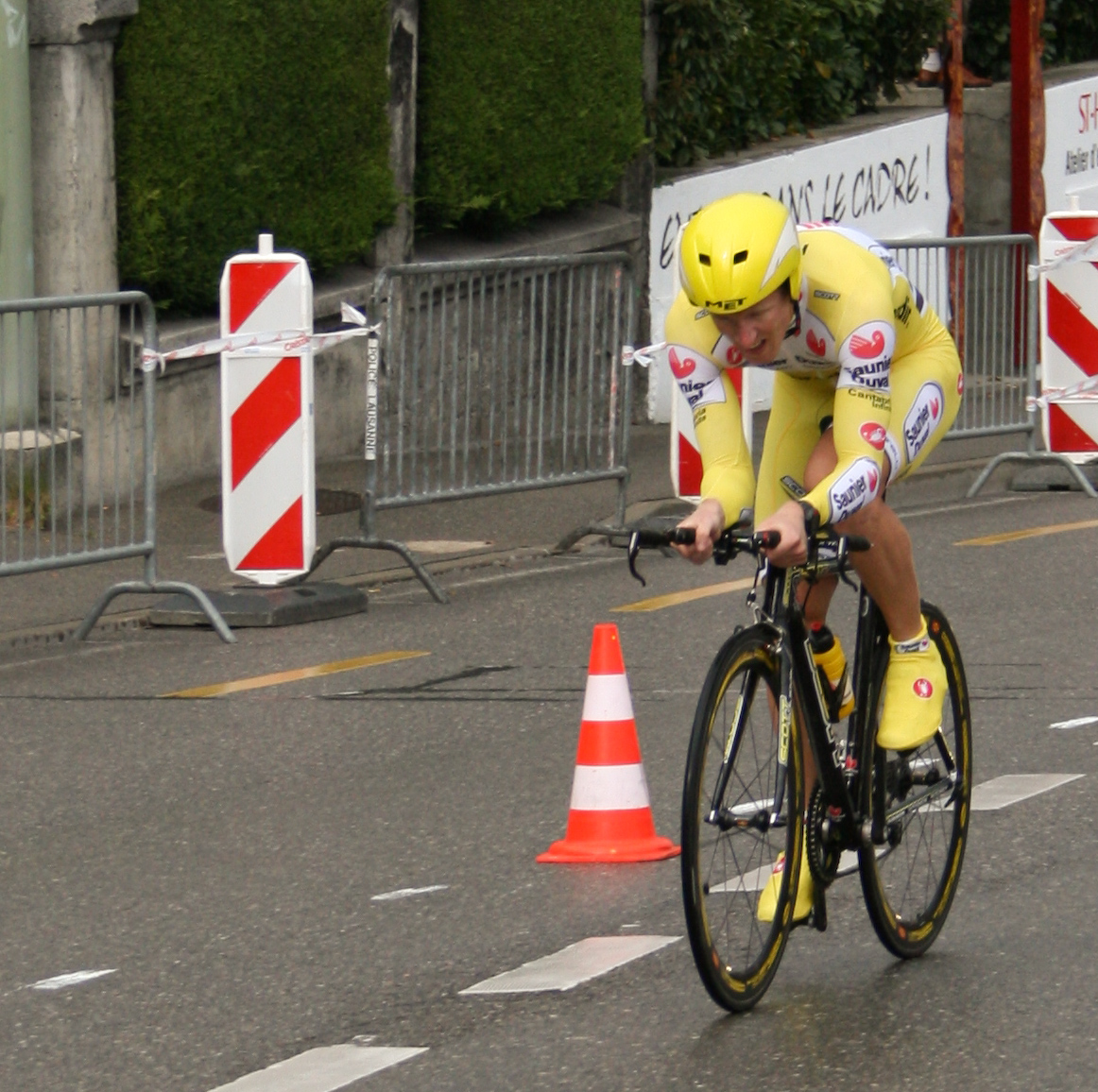

Personal information
- Full name: Remmert Wielinga
- Born: 27 April 1978 (age 48) Eindhoven, the Netherlands
- Height: 1.81 m (5 ft 11 in)
- Weight: 68 kg (150 lb)

Cycling career
- Sport: Cycling
- Discipline: Road
- Role: Rider

Amateur team
- 2000: Rabobank Beloften

Professional teams
- 2001–2002: De Nardi–Pasta Montegrappa
- 2003–2005: Rabobank
- 2006: Quick-Step–Innergetic
- 2007: Saunier Duval–Prodir
- 2011: Itera–Katusha

Major wins
- Gran Premio di Chiasso (2006)

Remmert Wielinga (born 27 April 1978 in Eindhoven) is a Dutch professional road bicycle racer. Wielinga turned professional in 2001 with the De Nardi–Pasta Montegrappa team. In 2003, he moved to Dutch squad Rabobank, where he took early victories with a stage win in the Vuelta a Andalucía and the Trofeo Calvià. In 2006, Wielinga moved to the Quick-Step–Innergetic team, where he took victory in Gran Premio di Chiasso. In 2007, Wielinga moved to Saunier Duval–Prodir, where he stayed for one season. Wielinga retired as a professional after the 2007 season but in 2011 he made a comeback riding for Itera–Katusha, the feeder team of Team Katusha, a UCI ProTeam.

== Major results ==
- Gran Premio di Chiasso (2006)
- Trofeo Calvià (2003)
- Vuelta a Andalucía – 1 stage (2003)
- Netherlands U23 Time Trial Champion (1999–2000)
- National U23 Road Race Championship – 2nd (2000)
