= Lierneux =

Municipality in Liège Province, Wallonia, Belgium

Lierneux Lierneu (Walloon)
- Municipality
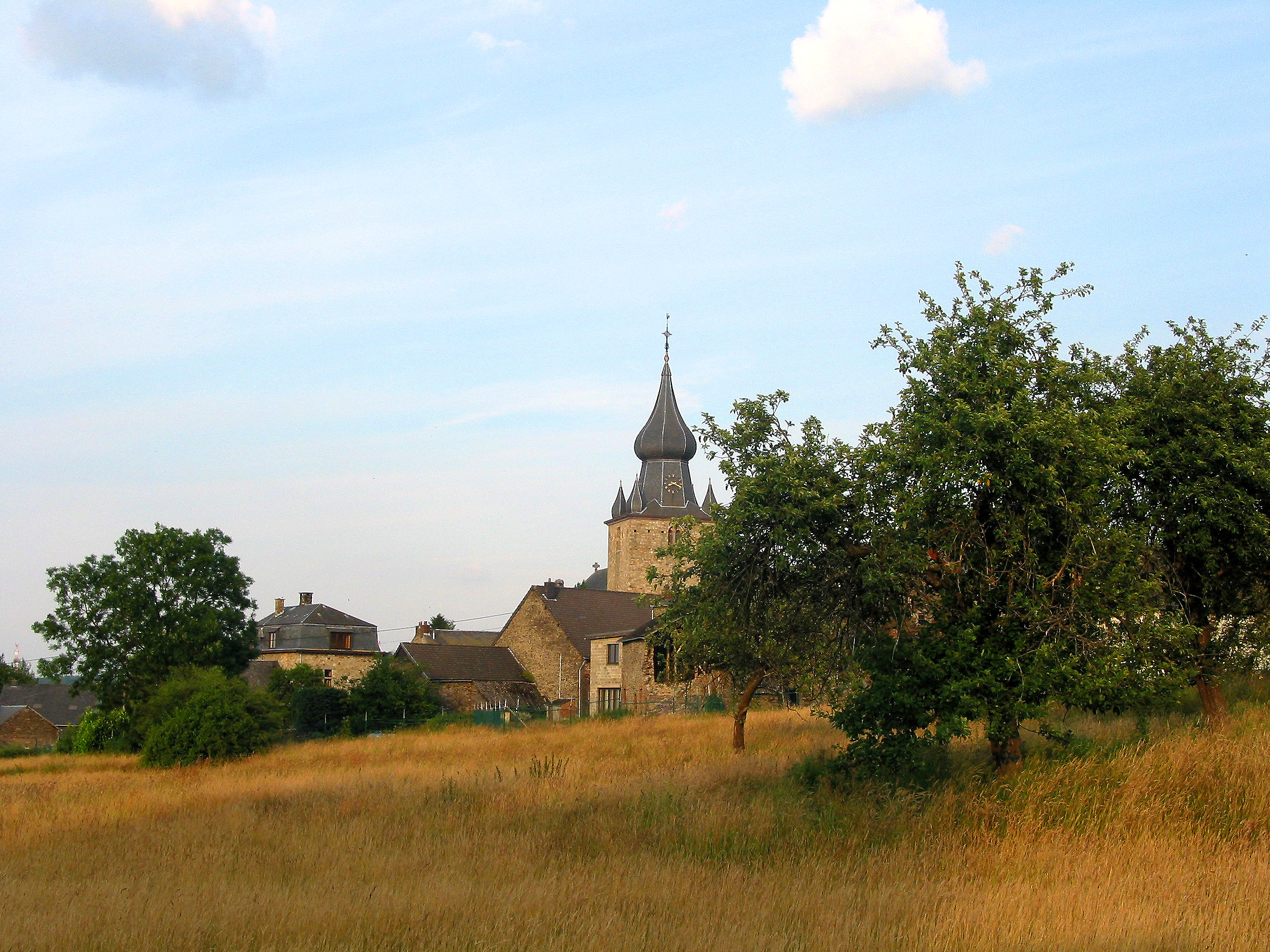

- Coat of arms

- Location of Lierneux in the province of Liège
- Interactive map of Lierneux
- Location in Belgium
- Coordinates: 50°17′N 05°48′E
- Country: Belgium
- Community: French Community
- Region: Wallonia
- Province: Liège
- Arrondissement: Verviers

Government
  - Mayor: André Samray
  - Governing party: Lierneux en Mieux !

Area
  - Total: 92.34 km^{2} (35.65 sq mi)

Population (2018-01-01)
  - Total: 3,601
  - Density: 39.00/km^{2} (101.0/sq mi)
- Postal codes: 4990
- NIS code: 63045
- Area codes: 080
- Website: www.lierneux.be

Lierneux (French pronunciation: [ljɛʁnø]; Walloon: Lierneu) is a municipality of Wallonia located in the province of Liège, Belgium.

On January 1, 2006, Lierneux had a total population of 3,367. The total area is 92.08 km^{2} which gives a population density of 37 inhabitants per km^{2}. Lierneux is known for its psychiatric hospital CHS l'Accueil.

The municipality consists of the following districts: Arbrefontaine, and Bra, and Lierneux.

== History ==
Within the bounds of the municipality a lies a memorial site to the tribute of the 82nd Airborne Division who won the Battle of the Bulge against the German SS division December 22, 1944.

== See also ==
- List of protected heritage sites in Lierneux
