= Nicolas Vereecken =

Belgian cyclist

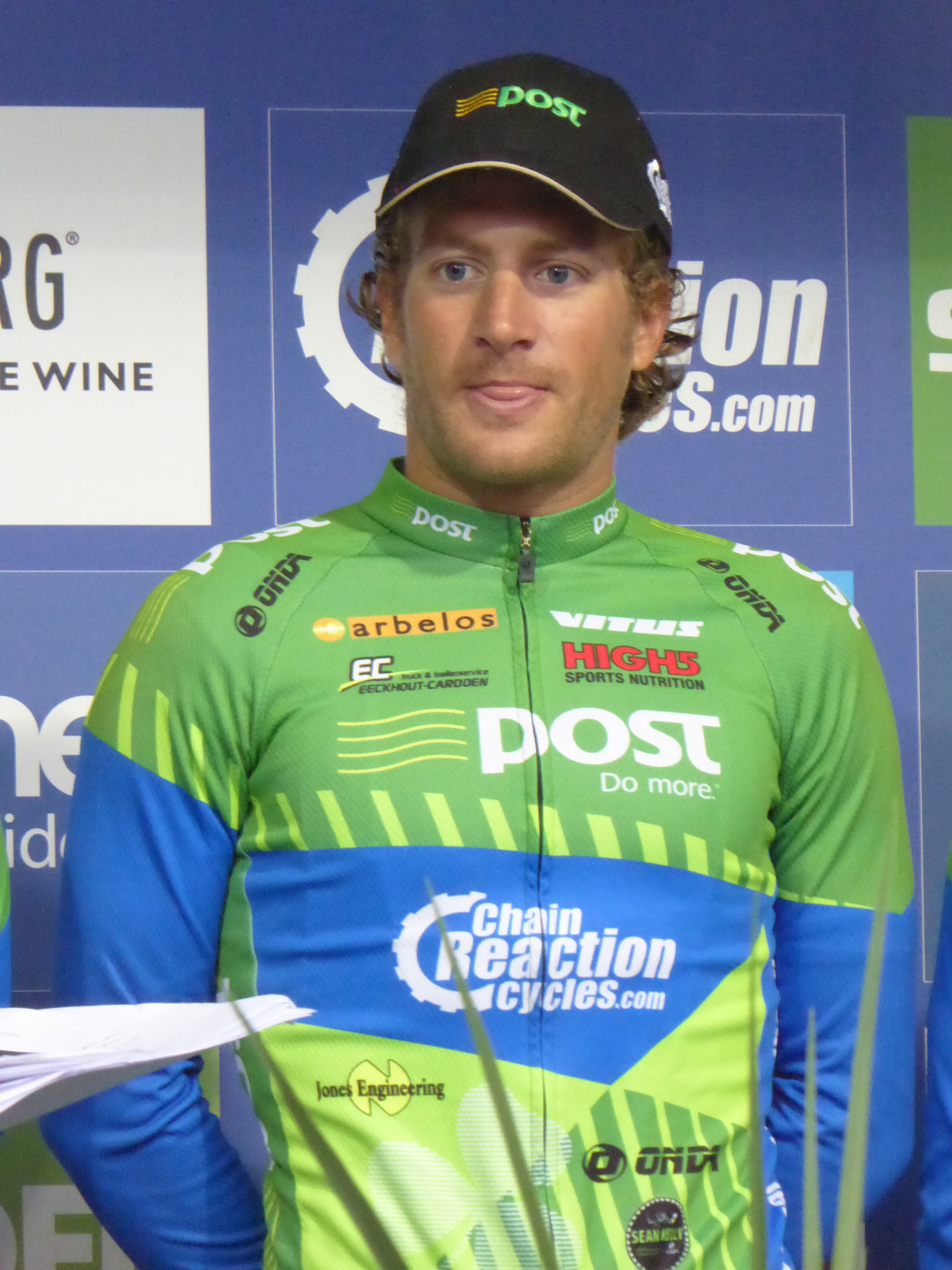
- Vereecken in 2016.

Personal information
- Full name: Nicolas Vereecken
- Born: 21 February 1990 (age 36) Beveren, Belgium

Cycling career
- Sport: Cycling
- Current team: Retired
- Discipline: Road
- Role: Rider

Amateur teams
- 2011: Ovyta–Eijssen–Acrog
- 2012: Lotto–Belisol U23

Professional teams
- 2013: An Post–Chain Reaction
- 2014: Verandas Willems
- 2015: Team3M
- 2016–2017: An Post–Chain Reaction

Nicolas Vereecken (born 21 February 1990) is a Belgian former professional cyclist, who rode professionally between 2013 and 2017 for the Verandas Willems, Team3M and An Post–Chain Reaction teams.

== Major results ==
2008
1st Sint-Martinusprijs Kontich
10th Paris–Roubaix Juniors
2010
10th Dwars door de Antwerpse Kempen
2012
10th Omloop der Kempen
2013
1st Topcompétition
1st Stadsprijs Geraardsbergen
3rd Overall Kreiz Breizh Elites
3rd Memorial Van Coningsloo
8th Omloop Het Nieuwsblad U23
8th Grote Prijs Stad Geel
9th Kattekoers
9th Grand Prix Pino Cerami
2014
1st Points classification Kreiz Breizh Elites
2nd Memorial Van Coningsloo
7th Kernen Omloop Echt-Susteren
9th Paris–Mantes-en-Yvelines
9th GP Maurice Raes
2015
1st Topcompétition
Le Triptyque des Monts et Châteaux

1st Mountains classification
1st Sprints classification

1st Sprints classification Olympia's Tour
5th Memorial Van Coningsloo
5th De Kustpijl
7th Overall Tour de Normandie

1st Stage 4

8th Kattekoers
9th Antwerpse Havenpijl
2016
1st Stage 2 Circuit des Ardennes
6th Rutland–Melton CiCLE Classic
6th Omloop Mandel-Leie-Schelde
8th Overall Tour de Normandie
8th Antwerpse Havenpijl
