= Edwig Cammaerts =

Belgian former road bicycle racer

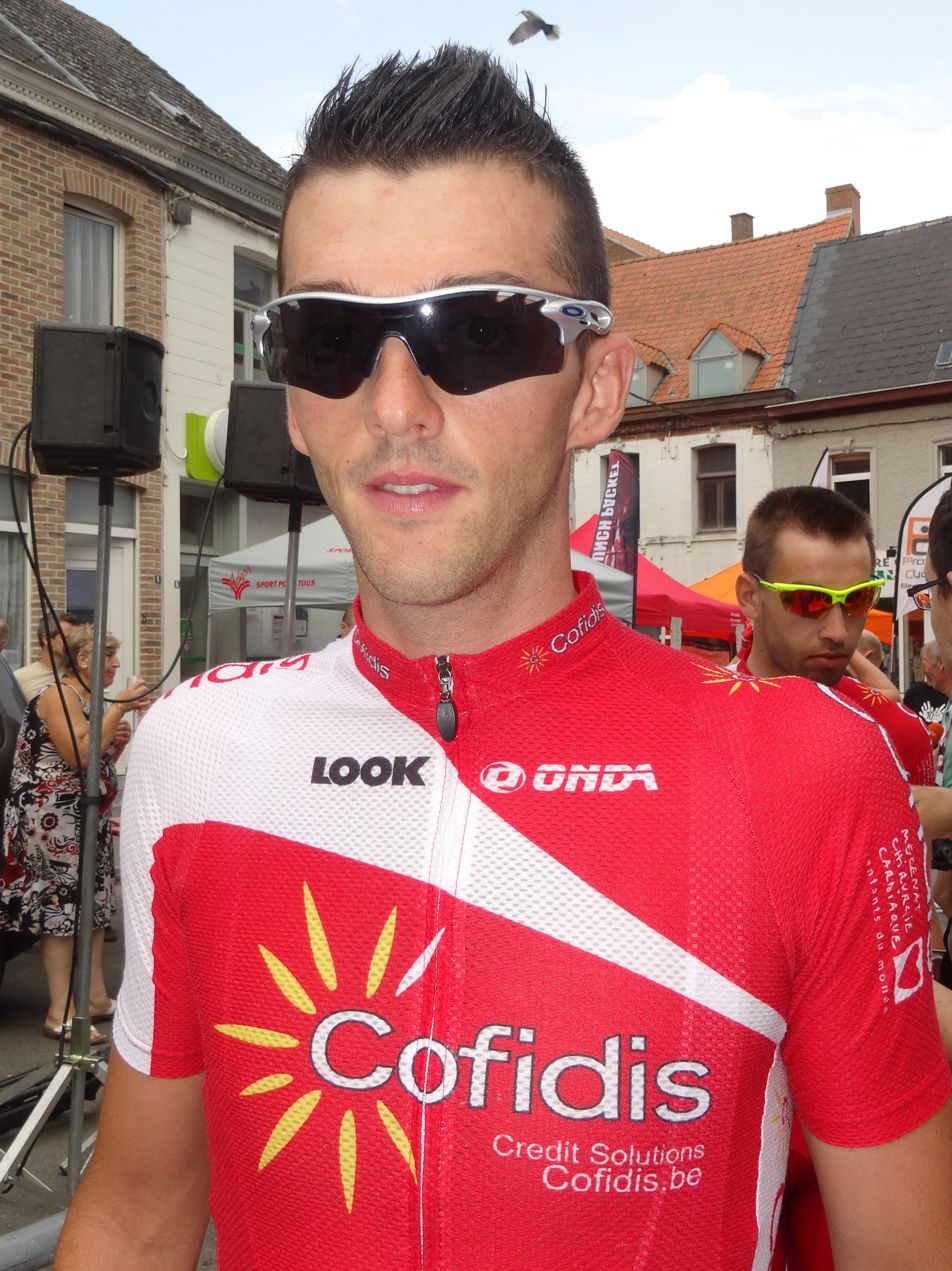
- Cammaerts in 2014

Personal information
- Full name: Edwig Cammaerts
- Born: 17 July 1987 (age 39) Namur, Belgium
- Height: 1.83 m (6 ft 0 in)
- Weight: 70 kg (150 lb; 11 st)

Cycling career
- Sport: Cycling
- Current team: Retired
- Discipline: Road
- Role: Rider

Amateur teams
- 2007: Jartazi–Promo Fashion (stagiaire)
- 2008: FC Wallonie–Bruxelles Espoirs
- 2008: Bodysol–EuroMillions (stagiaire)
- 2009–2010: Lotto–Bodysol

Professional teams
- 2011: Landbouwkrediet
- 2012–2014: Cofidis
- 2015: Veranclassic–Ekoi
- 2016: Team3M

Edwig Cammaerts (born 17 July 1987) is a Belgian former road bicycle racer, who competed professionally between 2011 and 2016 for the Landbouwkrediet, Cofidis, Veranclassic–Ekoi and Team3M squads.

== Career ==
Born in Namur, Cammaerts joined the Landbouwkrediet team in 2011 after two seasons with Lotto-Bodysol. During his one season with the team, Cammaerts was disqualified from Kuurne–Brussels–Kuurne, after riding through red lights at a level-crossing. Cammaerts joined Cofidis for the 2012 season. After no notable results with the team in 2012, Cammaerts took the first victory of his professional career in March 2013, when he won the 1.1-rated Classic Loire Atlantique race, the second round of the French Road Cycling Cup. Cammaerts attacked the peloton just over a kilometre from the finish, and soloed away to a seven-second margin of victory over the field in La Haie-Fouassière, led home by Ag2r–La Mondiale's Yauheni Hutarovich.

== Major results ==
2009
2nd Provincial Under-23 Road Race Championships
2nd Bolinne–Harlue
4th Overall Tour de la Province de Namur

1st Stage 3

4th Challenge de Hesbaye
4th Trofee van Haspengouw
4th Grand Prix Cammaerts
2010
1st Overall Tour de la Province de Namur
2nd Beverbeek Classic
3rd Provincial Road Race Championships
3rd Overall Triptyque Ardennaise
3rd Saint Trond–Bousalle
4th Trofee van Haspengouw
6th Grote Prijs Stad Geel
9th Omloop Het Nieuwsblad U23
10th Paris–Brussels
2011
5th Overall Tour de Wallonie
6th Circuit de Wallonie
6th Zwevezele Koers
7th Hel van het Mergelland
2013
1st Classic Loire Atlantique
