= Willeke van der Weide =

Dutch cyclist

Personal information
- Born: 9 September 1965 (age 61) Netherlands

Cycling career
- Sport: Cycling
- Role: Rider (road)
- Rider type: Endurance

Willeke van der Weide (born 9 September 1965) is a Dutch road racing cyclist.

Raised in Oudewater, she was known as a triathlete when she became national time trial champion in 1996.
