= Van der Weijden =

Van der Weijden is a Dutch toponymic surname meaning "from the meadows", which often referred to the village greens. The most common spelling variant is Van der Weide and other variants are Van der Weiden, Van der Weijde, Van der Weyde, and Van der Weyden. People with these names include:

== Van der Weijden ==
- Annouk van der Weijden (born 1986), Dutch speed skater
- Ellen van der Weijden-Bast (born 1971), Dutch water polo player
- Maarten van der Weijden (born 1981), Dutch long-distance swimmer
- Abraham van der Weijden (1743–1773), Freemason and Ship's captain

== Van der Weide ==
- Karel van der Weide (born 1973), Dutch chess grandmaster
- Raoul van der Weide (born 1949), Dutch jazz bassist
- Sander van der Weide (born 1976), Dutch field hockey player
- Willeke van der Weide (born 1965), Dutch road racing cyclist

== Van der Weyde / Van der Weijde ==
- Henry Van der Weyde (1838–1924), Dutch-born English painter and photographer (born Pieter Hendrik van der Weijde)
- William van der Weyde (1871–1928), American photojournalist

== Van der Weyden ==
- Harry van der Weyden (1868–1952), American Impressionist painter
- Goswin van der Weyden (1455–1543), Flemish Renaissance painter
- Rogier van der Weyden (1399/1400–1464), Early Netherlandish painter

== See also ==
- 9576 van der Weyden, a main belt asteroid named after Rogier van der Weyden
