= Emiel Vermeulen =

Belgian cyclist

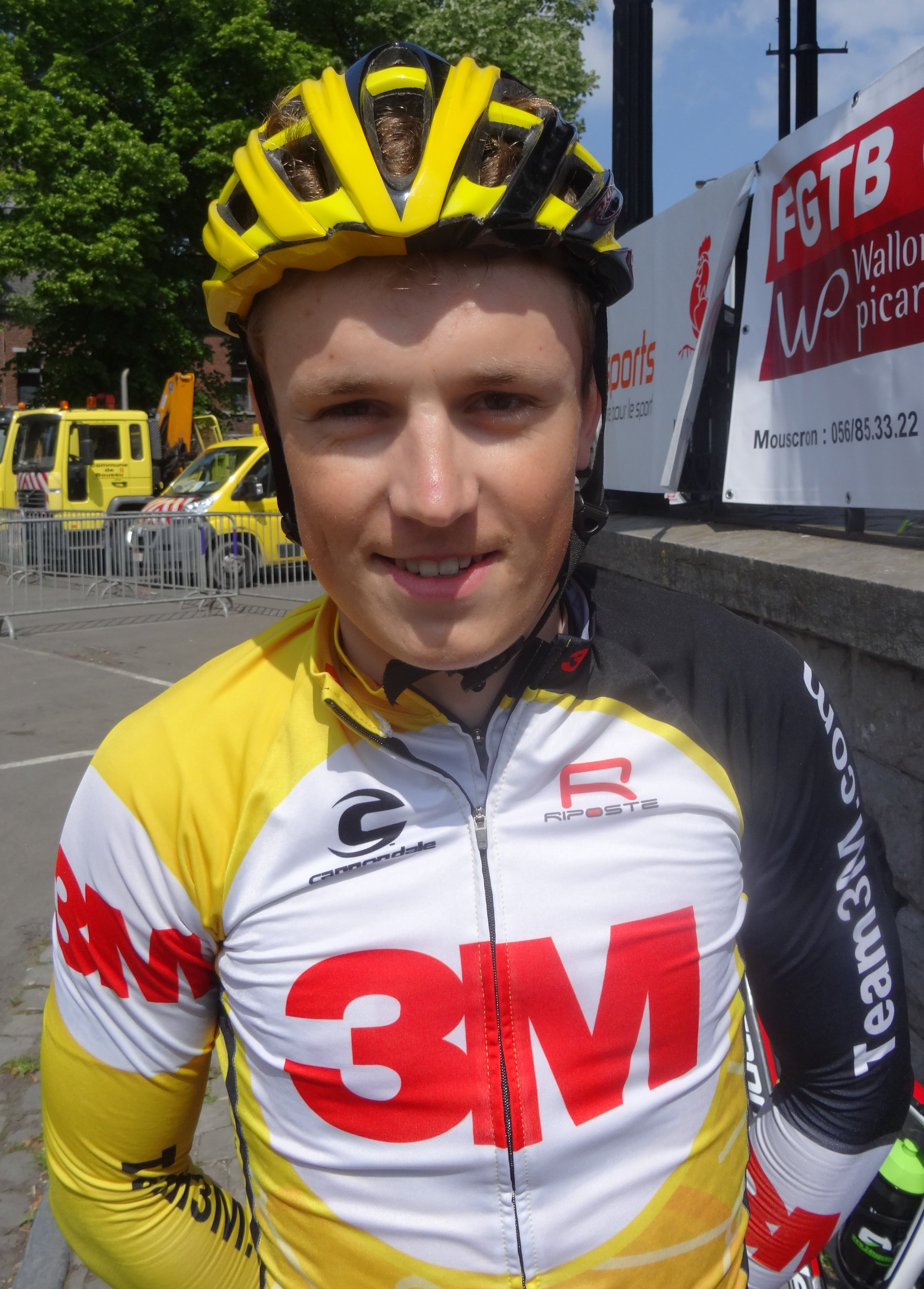
- Vermeulen at the 2014 Grand Prix Criquielion

Personal information
- Full name: Emiel Vermeulen
- Born: 16 February 1993 (age 33) Koolskamp, Belgium
- Height: 1.69 m (5 ft 7 in)
- Weight: 64 kg (141 lb)

Cycling career
- Sport: Cycling
- Current team: Retired
- Discipline: Road
- Role: Rider
- Rider type: Sprinter

Amateur teams
- 2011: Molenspurters Meulebeke Juniors
- 2012–2013: EFC–Omega Pharma–Quick-Step

Professional teams
- 2014–2016: Team3M
- 2017–2022: Roubaix–Lille Métropole
- 2023: BEAT Cycling Club

Emiel Vermeulen (born 16 February 1993 in La Louvière) is a Belgian former cyclist, who competed as a professional from 2014 to 2023.

== Major results ==
2010
3rd Road race, National Junior Road Championships
2011
5th Omloop der Vlaamse Gewesten
5th Omloop Mandel-Leie-Schelde Juniors
2015
9th Nationale Sluitingprijs
10th Kernen Omloop Echt-Susteren
2016
2nd Gooikse Pijl
3rd Grote Prijs Marcel Kint
6th Ronde van Noord-Holland
8th Omloop Mandel-Leie-Schelde
2017
2nd Famenne Ardenne Classic
3rd Gooikse Pijl
4th Grand Prix de la Ville de Lillers
7th Overall Paris–Arras Tour
8th Kampioenschap van Vlaanderen
10th Grand Prix de la ville de Pérenchies
10th Paris–Troyes
2018
2nd Grand Prix de la ville de Pérenchies
4th Kampioenschap van Vlaanderen
8th Omloop van het Houtland
2019
1st Grand Prix de la ville de Nogent-sur-Oise
4th Grand Prix d'Isbergues
5th Grand Prix de Denain
6th Cholet-Pays de Loire
7th Kampioenschap van Vlaanderen
2020
8th Grand Prix d'Isbergues
2021
1st Grand Prix de la ville de Pérenchies
8th Grote Prijs Jean-Pierre Monseré
2022
4th Grand Prix de la ville de Pérenchies
4th Sluitingsprijs Putte-Kapellen
