= Team3M =

Belgian cycling team

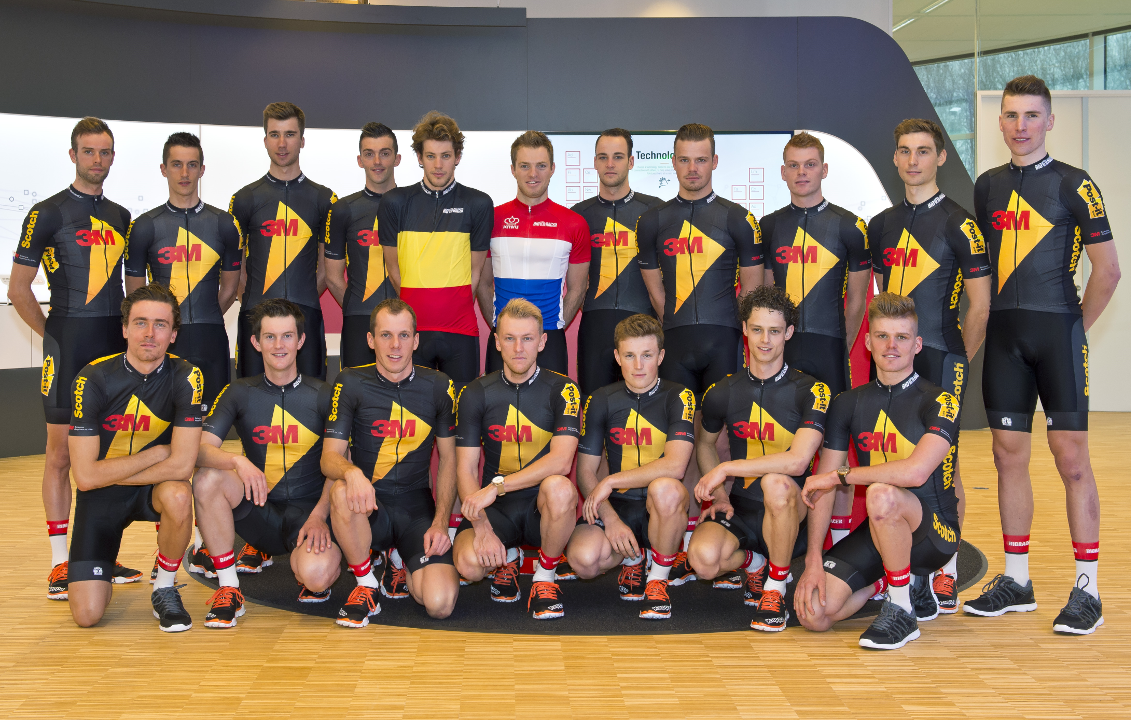
- The team in 2016

Team information
- UCI code: MMM
- Registered: Belgium
- Founded: 2013
- Disbanded: 2016
- Discipline: Road
- Status: UCI Continental
- Bicycles: Ridley

Key personnel
- General manager: Bernard Moerman
- Team managers: Tim Lacroix; Frank Boeckx; Thierry Fevery

Team name history
- 2013–2016: Team 3M
Team3M jersey
Jersey

Team3M was a Belgian UCI Continental team founded in 2013. It participated in UCI Continental Circuits races. It is sponsored by the American multinational 3M.

The team disbanded at the end of the 2016 season.

== 2016 Roster ==
Name	Birthday	Nationality	Team in 2015
Edwig Cammaerts	17 July 1987	Belgium	Veranclassic-Ekoi
Jaap de Man	28 March 1993	Netherlands	
Gertjan De Vos	7 August 1991	Belgium	
Martijn Degreve	14 April 1993	Belgium	
Laurent Evrard	22 September 1991	Belgium	Wallonie-Bruxelles
Jelle Goderis	24 March 1991	Belgium	Veranclassic-Ekoi
Piotr Havik	7 July 1994	Netherlands	Rabobank Development Team
Yoeri Havik	19 February 1991	Netherlands	SEG Racing
Jimmy Janssens	30 May 1989	Belgium	
Dick Janssens	1 August 1994	Netherlands	De Jonge Renner
Jerôme Kerf	1 September 1991	Belgium	Vérandas Willems
Christophe Sleurs	25 June 1990	Belgium	
Ricardo van Dongen	18 June 1994	Netherlands	SEG Racing
Bob Schoonbroodt	12 February 1991	Netherlands	Parkhotel Valkenburg Continental Cycling Team
Emiel Vermeulen	16 February 1993	Belgium	
Michael Vingerling	28 June 1990	Netherlands	
Kenny Willems	27 October 1993	Belgium	Rock Werchter Toekomstvrienden Cycling Team
Melvin Van Zijl	10 December 1991	Belgium	

== Major wins ==
2015
Omloop van het Waasland, Geert van der Weijst
Stage 4 Tour de Normandie, Nicolas Vereecken
