= Dutch National Road Race Championships =

National road cycling championship in the Netherlands

The Jersey for the Dutch Champion

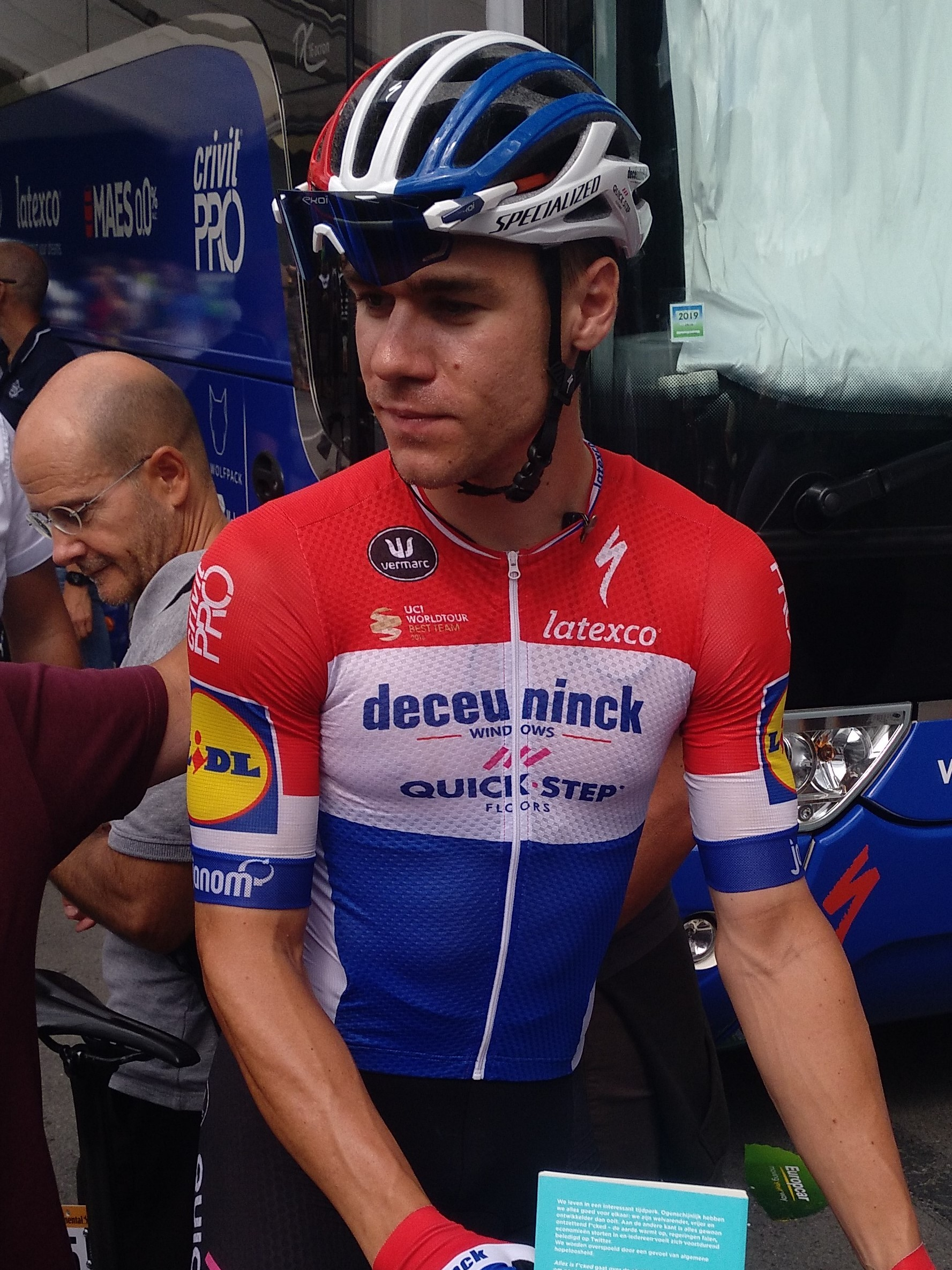
Fabio Jakobsen, the 2019 champion.

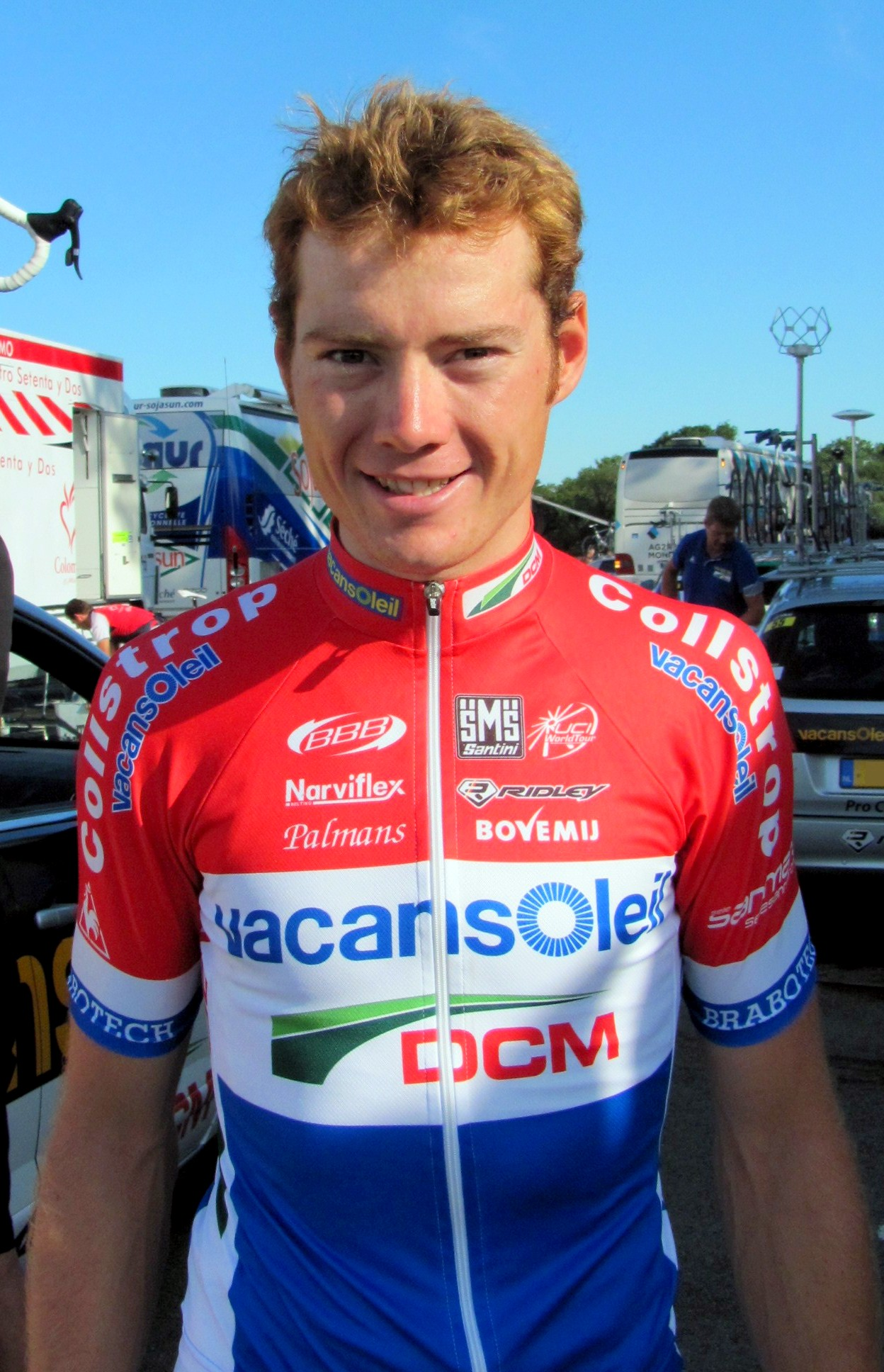
Pim Ligthart, male national champion in 2011

The Dutch National Road Race Championships take place annually, on the weekend prior to the start of the Tour de France. First held in 1888, today it is organized by the Top Sports Group, commissioned by the KNWU.

== Men ==
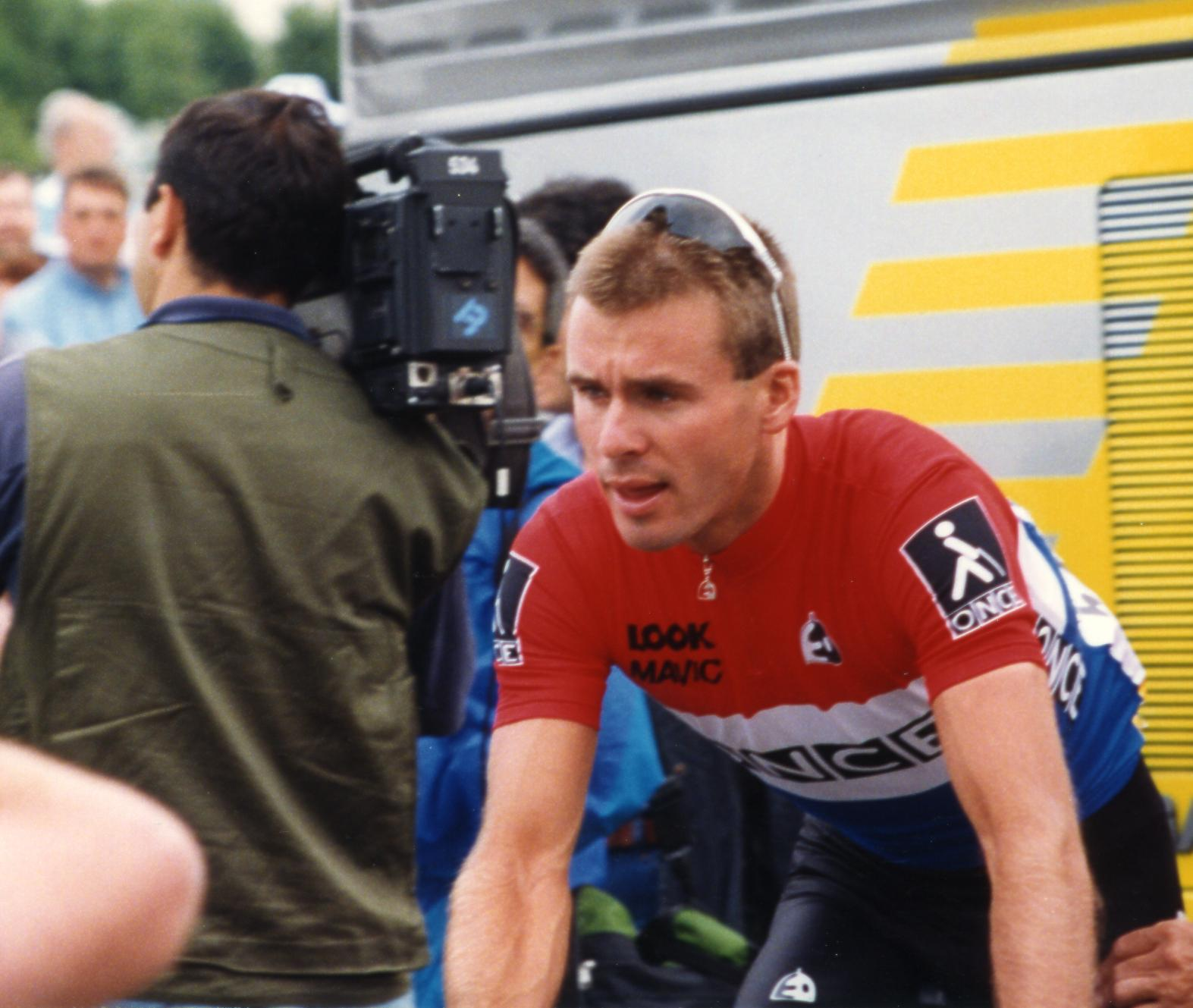
Erik Breukink in the national champion's jersey at the 1993 Tour de France

Until 1927, the race was open for all categories, after 1927 only for professional cyclists with or without contract.

=== Elite ===
| Year | Gold | Silver | Bronze |
| 1888 | Hermanus Willem van Raden | Rudolph van Pallandt | —N/a (Note: Only two riders finished the race.) |
| 1889 | Willem Gijsbert Del Baere | Aleid Johan Korthals Altes | Pieter Bokma |
| 1890 | Henri Raland | Jaap Houtman | Daam Fockema |
| 1891 | Carel Koning | Kees Witteveen | Karel Smits |
| 1892 | Henk van de Griendt | Jacques Siep | August Eijsink |
| 1893 | Jaap Eden | W. de Haas | Jacques Siep |
| 1894 | Jaap Eden | Kees Witteveen | Mathieu Cordang |
| 1895 | Willem van de Mey | Kees Witteveen | Philippus Johannes Adrian |
| 1896 | Willem van de Mey | Koos van der Knoop | Herman Van Koolbergen |
| 1897– 1903 | Not held | | |
| 1904 | Jan de Groot | Cees van der Wiel | M.-J. Nigten |
| 1905 | Not held | | |
| 1906 | Gerrit van Vliet | Jan de Jager | Anton van Lieshout |
| 1907 | Jan Tulleken | J. Bloem | Johan 't Hart |
| 1908 | Adrie Slot | Cornelis de Visser | J. Bloem |
| 1909 | Chris Kalkman | Dorus Nijland | George Damen |
| 1910 | Henk Tamse | Pieter van Kersen | Gerard Franssen |
| 1911 | Krijn Schippers | Piet van der Wiel | Adriaan Gaillard |
| 1912 | Cees Erkelens | Piet Borremans | Cor Blekemolen |
| 1913 (Note: Races were held in Belgium as road races were forbidden in the Netherlands.) | Frits Wiersma | Herman Maas | Frans van Hilst |
| 1914 | Chris Kalkman | Piet van der Wiel | Gerard Vlemmix |
| 1915 | Jorinus van der Wiel | Piet van der Wiel | Barend Gebuis |
| 1916 | Klaas van Nek | Frits Wiersma | Barend Gebuis |
| 1917 | Jorinus van der Wiel | Piet Ikelaar | Evert van Grafhorst |
| 1918 | Jorinus van der Wiel | Frans Rutten | D. Wouters |
| 1919 | Frits Wiersma | Jorinus van der Wiel | Gerrit Waldner |
| 1920 | Frits Wiersma | Piet Ikelaar | Jan Devries |
| 1921 | Jorinus van der Wiel | Evert van Grafhorst | Piet Ikelaar |
| 1922 | Herman Nankman | Jan van der Stel | Henk Datema |
| 1923 | Piet Ikelaar | Jan Bekkering | Johan van Melis |
| 1924 | Piet Ikelaar | Gérard Vreeswijk | Jorinus van der Wiel |
| 1925 | Jorinus van der Wiel | Piet Ikelaar | Joep Franssen |
| 1926 | Klaas van Nek (Note: Jorinus van der Wiel crossed the line in first position, but was demoted for impeding Klaas van Nek.) | Jorinus van der Wiel | Frans van Wijk |
| 1927 | Josep Franssen | Jan van Rooy | Gerrit van den Berg |
| 1928 | Hans Bockom | August Ramakers | Jan van Rooy |
| 1929 | Hans Bockom | Marten van Hal | —N/a |
| 1930 | Adrianus Braspennincx | Jo Anspach | —N/a |
| 1931 | Cesar Bogaert | Abraham Ranschaart | Abraham Polak |
| 1932 | Marinus Valentijn | Thijs van Oers | —N/a |
| 1933 | Thijs van Oers | Cesar Bogaert | Marinus Valentijn |
| 1934 | Cesar Bogaert | Gerrit Van De Ruit | Willem Cober |
| 1935 | Marinus Valentijn | Cees Heeren | Alfons Stuyts |
| 1936 | Kees Pellenaars | Louis van Schijndel | Jan Gommers |
| 1937 | John Braspennincx | Jan Verveer | Fred Mostard |
| 1938 | Theo Middelkamp | Gerrit Schulte | Marinus Valentijn |
| 1939 | Janus Hellemons | Arie Overweel | Willem Reuter |
| 1940 | Louis Motke | Piet van Nek | Willem Reuter |
| 1941 | Louis Motke | Aad van Amsterdam | Cees Joossen |
| 1942 | John Braspennincx | Cor Bakker | Huub Sijen |
| 1943 | Theo Middelkamp | Cees Joossen | Frans van de Zande |
| 1944 | Gerrit Schulte | Huub Sijen | Theo Middelkamp |
| 1945 | Theo Middelkamp | Adri Steenbakkers | Wim de Ruyter |
| 1946 | Bouk Schellingerhoudt | Theo Middelkamp | Huub Sijen |
| 1947 | Sjefke Janssen | Gerrit Schulte | Frans Pauwels |
| 1948 | Gerrit Schulte | Huub Sijen | Theo Middelkamp |
| 1949 | Sjefke Janssen | Wim van Est | Gerrit Voorting |
| 1950 | Gerrit Schulte | Wout Wagtmans | Sjefke Janssen |
| 1951 | Hans Dekkers | Wim van Est | Wout Wagtmans |
| 1952 | Hans Dekkers | Wim van Est | Wout Wagtmans |
| 1953 | Gerrit Schulte | Wim van Est | Wout Wagtmans |
| 1954 | Adrie Voorting | Wout Wagtmans | Gerrit Voorting |
| 1955 | Thijs Roks | Hein van Breenen | Wout Wagtmans |
| 1956 | Wim van Est | Leo van der Pluym | Arend van t'Hof |
| 1957 | Wim van Est | Jules Maenen | Jef Lahaye |
| 1958 | Jef Lahaye | Mies Stolker | Gerrit Voorting |
| 1959 | Piet Damen | Bram Kool | Joop Captein |
| 1960 | Bas Maliepaard | Albertus Geldermans | Antoon van der Steen |
| 1961 | Bas Maliepaard | Jacques van der Klundert | Mies Stolker |
| 1962 | Albertus Geldermans | Jo de Roo | Piet Rentmeester |
| 1963 | Peter Post | Dick Groeneweg | Lex van Kreuningen |
| 1964 | Jo de Roo | Cees Haast | Rik Wouters |
| 1965 | Jo de Roo | Arie den Hartog | Leo Knops |
| 1966 | Gerben Karstens | Cees Haast | Henk Nijdam |
| 1967 | ~~Evert Dolman~~ (Note: Evert Dolman was disqualified after doping use, and the title was not reattributed.) | Jo de Roo | Wim Schepers |
| 1968 | Evert Dolman | Harm Ottenbros | Jan Harings |
| 1969 | Jan Frijters | Evert Dolman | Gerben Karstens |
| 1970 | Peter Kisner | Harrie Jansen | Jos van der Vleuten |
| 1971 | Joop Zoetemelk | Wim Prinsen | Gerben Karstens |
| 1972 | Tino Tabak | Joop Zoetemelk | Rini Wagtmans |
| 1973 | Joop Zoetemelk | ~~Ben Janbroers~~ | Gerben Karstens |
| 1974 | Cees Priem | Gerard Vianen | Nidi den Hertog |
| 1975 | Hennie Kuiper | Bert Pronk | Joop Zoetemelk |
| 1976 | Jan Raas | Aad van den Hoek | Hennie Kuiper |
| 1977 | Fedor den Hertog | Jan Krekels | Gerrie Knetemann |
| 1978 | Henk Lubberding | Jan Raas | Piet van Katwijk |
| 1979 | Henk Lubberding | Joop Zoetemelk | Jan Raas |
| 1980 | Johan van der Velde | Jos Schipper | Theo de Rooij |
| 1981 | Jacques Hanegraaf | Gerrie Knetemann | Adri van der Poel |
| 1982 | Johan van der Velde | Peter Winnen | Joop Zoetemelk |
| 1983 | Jan Raas | Henk Lubberding | Adri van der Poel |
| 1984 | Jan Raas | Henk Lubberding | Johan van der Velde |
| 1985 | Jacques Hanegraaf | Gerard Veldscholten | Jacques van Meer |
| 1986 | Jos Lammertink | Nico Verhoeven | Peter Stevenhaagen |
| 1987 | Adri van der Poel | Gerrit Solleveld | Theo de Rooij |
| 1988 | Peter Pieters | Adri van der Poel | Teun van Vliet |
| 1989 | Frans Maassen | Johan Lammerts | Maarten Ducrot |
| 1990 | Peter Winnen | Steven Rooks | Henri Manders |
| 1991 | Steven Rooks | Gert-Jan Theunisse | Erik Breukink |
| 1992 | Tristan Hoffman | Jan Siemons | Erik Breukink |
| 1993 | Erik Breukink | Steven Rooks | Frans Maassen |
| 1994 | Steven Rooks | Gert-Jan Theunisse | Marco Vermey |
| 1995 | Servais Knaven | Danny Nelissen | Maarten den Bakker |
| 1996 | Maarten den Bakker | Bart Voskamp | Erik Dekker |
| 1997 | Michael Boogerd | Erik Breukink | Servais Knaven |
| 1998 | Michael Boogerd | Tristan Hoffman | Léon van Bon |
| 1999 | Maarten den Bakker | Servais Knaven | Raymond Meijs |
| 2000 | Léon van Bon | Koos Moerenhout | Erik Dekker |
| 2001 | Jans Koerts | Rudie Kemna | Louis de Koning |
| 2002 | Stefan van Dijk | Rudie Kemna | Max van Heeswijk |
| 2003 | Rudie Kemna | Stefan van Dijk | Max van Heeswijk |
| 2004 | Erik Dekker | Koos Moerenhout | Arthur Farenhout |
| 2005 | Léon van Bon | Steven de Jongh | Max van Heeswijk |
| 2006 | ~~Michael Boogerd~~ (Note: The original winner, Michael Boogerd, was stripped of all his results between 2005 and 2007 due to his confession of doping. The title was not reattributed.) | Sebastian Langeveld | Karsten Kroon |
| 2007 | Koos Moerenhout | Sebastian Langeveld | Maarten den Bakker |
| 2008 | Lars Boom | Koos Moerenhout | Steven de Jongh |
| 2009 | Koos Moerenhout | Kenny van Hummel | Joost van Leijen |
| 2010 | Niki Terpstra | Pieter Weening | Lars Boom |
| 2011 | Pim Ligthart | Bram Tankink | Reinier Honig |
| 2012 | Niki Terpstra | Lars Boom | Bert-Jan Lindeman |
| 2013 | Johnny Hoogerland | Tom Dumoulin | Sebastian Langeveld |
| 2014 | Sebastian Langeveld | Niki Terpstra | Wesley Kreder |
| 2015 | Niki Terpstra | Ramon Sinkeldam | Danny van Poppel |
| 2016 | Dylan Groenewegen | Wouter Wippert | Wim Stroetinga |
| 2017 | Ramon Sinkeldam | Wouter Wippert | Dylan Groenewegen |
| 2018 | Mathieu van der Poel | Danny van Poppel | Ramon Sinkeldam |
| 2019 | Fabio Jakobsen | Moreno Hofland | Bas van der Kooij |
| 2020 | Mathieu van der Poel | Nils Eekhoff | Timo Roosen |
| 2021 | Timo Roosen | Sjoerd Bax | Oscar Riesebeek |
| 2022 | Pascal Eenkhoorn | Daan Hoole | Taco van der Hoorn |
| 2023 | Dylan van Baarle | Olav Kooij | Mathieu van der Poel |
| 2024 | Dylan Groenewegen | Olav Kooij | Ramon Sinkeldam |
| 2025 | Danny van Poppel | Olav Kooij | Dylan Groenewegen |
| 2026 | Wilco Kelderman | Bauke Mollema | Jochem Kerkhaert |

=== U23 ===
| Year | Gold | Silver | Bronze |
| 1995 | Steven de Jongh | Jurgen van Pelt | Rik Reinerink |
| 1996 | Stefan van Dijk | Michel Cerneus | Wally Buurstede |
| 1997 | Johan Bruinsma | Karsten Kroon | Coen Boerman |
| 1998 | Addy Engels | Marcel Duijn | Mark ter Schure |
| 1999 | Mathew Hayman | Addy Engels | Thorwald Veneberg |
| 2000 | Bram Tankink | Remmert Wielinga | David Orvalho |
| 2001 | Arno Wallaard | Thijs Al | Maarten Lenferink |
| 2002 | Pieter Weening | Frank van Dulmen | Hans Dekkers |
| 2003 | Thomas Dekker | Hans Dekkers | Jos Pronk |
| 2004 | Bas Giling | Kenny van Hummel | Tom Veelers |
| 2005 | Sebastian Langeveld | Reinier Honig | Johnny Hoogerland |
| 2006 | Kai Reus | Tom Leezer | Arjen de Baat |
| 2007 | Tom Leezer | Arjen de Baat | Jos van Emden |
| 2008 | Ronan van Zandbeek | Leander Pronk | Dennis van Winden |
| 2009 | Steven Kruijswijk | Ramon Sinkeldam | Boy van Poppel |
| 2010 | Tom-Jelte Slagter | Ramon Sinkeldam | Tijmen Eising |
| 2011 | Ramon Sinkeldam | Maurits Lammertink | Wesley Kreder |
| 2012 | Moreno Hofland | Sjoerd Kouwenhoven | Daan Olivier |
| 2013 | Dylan van Baarle | Mike Teunissen | Joey van Rhee |
| 2014 | Tim Kerkhof | Dennis Bakker | Piotr Havik |
| 2015 | Stan Godrie | Fabio Jakobsen | Davy Gunst |
| 2016 | Fabio Jakobsen | Tim Ariesen | Martijn Budding |
| 2017 | Fabio Jakobsen | Stef Krul | Hartthijs de Vries |
| 2018 | Julius van den Berg | Marten Kooistra | Oscar Van Wijk |
| 2019 | David Dekker | Nils Eekhoff | Marijn van den Berg |
| 2020 | Stijn Daemen | Mick van Dijke | Bodo Del Grosso |
| 2021 | Tim van Dijke | Mick van Dijke | Casper van Uden |
| 2022 | Max Kroonen | Loe van Belle | Mees Hendrikx |
| 2024 | Pepijn Reinderink | Luke Verburg | Jesse Kramer |
| 2024 | Tibor del Grosso | Mike Bronswijk | Elmar Abma |

== Women ==
| Year | Gold | Silver | Bronze |
| 1965 | Ineke van IJken | Bella Hage | Alie Zijlmans |
| 1966 | Bella Hage | Keetie van Oosten-Hage | |
| 1967 | Bella Hage | Hennie Faber-Hondeveld | Keetie van Oosten-Hage |
| 1968 | Bella Hage | Hennie Faber-Hondeveld | Thea Smulders |
| 1969 | Keetie van Oosten-Hage | Hennie Faber-Hondeveld | Thea Smulders |
| 1970 | Keetie van Oosten-Hage | Hennie Faber-Hondeveld | Bella van der Spiegel-Hage |
| 1971 | Keetie van Oosten-Hage | Hennie Faber-Hondeveld | Thea Smulders |
| 1972 | Keetie van Oosten-Hage | Bella van der Spiegel-Hage | Minie Brinkhoff-Nieuwenhuis |
| 1973 | Keetie van Oosten-Hage | Willy Kwantes | Truus van der Plaat |
| 1974 | Keetie van Oosten-Hage | Minie Brinkhoff-Nieuwenhuis | Willy Kwantes |
| 1975 | Keetie van Oosten-Hage | Gre Donkers-Knetemann | Truus van der Plaat |
| 1976 | Keetie van Oosten-Hage | Tineke Fopma | Annie Weegberg |
| 1977 | Nita van Vliet | Nel Streef | Agnes Koeman-van Helvoirt |
| 1978 | Keetie van Oosten-Hage | Bella van der Spiegel-Hage | Truus van der Plaat |
| 1979 | Tineke Fopma | Hennie Top | Keetie van Oosten-Hage |
| 1980 | Hennie Top | Leontine van der Lienden | Mary Barendregt |
| 1981 | Hennie Top | Tineke Fopma | Leontine van der Lienden |
| 1982 | Hennie Top | Leontine van der Lienden | Wil Bezemer |
| 1983 | Thea van Rijnsoever | Mieke Havik | Leontine van der Lienden |
| 1984 | Connie Meijer | Leontine van der Lienden | Hennie Top |
| 1985 | Thea van Rijnsoever | Heleen Hage | Hanneke Lieverse |
| 1986 | Heleen Hage | Mieke Havik | Thea van Rijnsoever |
| 1987 | Mieke Havik | Jolanda Cools-van Dongen | Karin Schuitema |
| 1988 | Monique Knol | Leontien van Moorsel | Cyntha Lutke Schipholt |
| 1989 | Leontien van Moorsel | Petra Groen | Astrid Donkersloot |
| 1990 | Leontien van Moorsel | Agnes Loohuis-Damveld | Manon de Rooy |
| 1991 | Petra Grimbergen | Monique Knol | Leontien van Moorsel |
| 1992 | Leontien van Moorsel | Petra Grimbergen | Monique Knol |
| 1993 | Leontien van Moorsel | Daniëlle Overgaag | Elsbeth van Rooy-Vink |
| 1994 | Yvonne Brunen | Elsbeth van Rooy-Vink | Edith Klep-Moerenhout |
| 1995 | Yvonne Brunen | Margaretha Groen | Maria Jongeling |
| 1996 | Yvonne Brunen | Meike de Bruijn | Ingrid Haringa |
| 1997 | Nicole Vermast | Yvonne Brunen | Edith Klep-Moerenhout |
| 1998 | Leontien van Moorsel-Zijlaard | Chantal Beltman | Wendy Kramp |
| 1999 | Leontien van Moorsel-Zijlaard | Mirjam Melchers | Yvonne Brunen |
| 2000 | Mirjam Melchers | Leontien van Moorsel-Zijlaard | Chantal Beltman |
| 2001 | Sissy van Alebeek | Bertine Spijkerman | Martine Bras |
| 2002 | Arenda Grimberg | Leontien van Moorsel-Zijlaard | Mirjam Melchers |
| 2003 | Suzanne de Goede | Christine Mos | Esther van der Helm |
| 2004 | Leontien van Moorsel-Zijlaard | Chantal Beltman | Loes Markerink |
| 2005 | Janneke Vos | Sharon van Essen | Josephine Groenveld |
| 2006 | Marianne Vos | Sharon van Essen | Suzanne de Goede |
| 2007 | Marlijn Binnendijk | Marianne Vos | Suzanne de Goede |
| 2008 | Marianne Vos | Mirjam Melchers-van Poppel | Regina Bruins |
| 2009 | Marianne Vos | Chantal Blaak | Andrea Bosman |
| 2010 | Loes Gunnewijk | Marianne Vos | Irene van den Broek |
| 2011 | Marianne Vos | Irene van den Broek | Chantal Blaak |
| 2012 | Annemiek van Vleuten | Marianne Vos | Lucinda Brand |
| 2013 | Lucinda Brand | Marianne Vos | Annemiek van Vleuten |
| 2014 | Iris Slappendel | Lucinda Brand | Marianne Vos |
| 2015 | Lucinda Brand | Amy Pieters | Annemiek van Vleuten |
| 2016 | Anouska Koster | Janneke Ensing | Marianne Vos |
| 2017 | Chantal Blaak | Anouska Koster | Floortje Mackaij |
| 2018 | Chantal Blaak | Amy Pieters | Marianne Vos |
| 2019 | Lorena Wiebes | Marianne Vos | Amy Pieters |
| 2020 | Anna van der Breggen | Annemiek van Vleuten | Anouska Koster |
| 2021 | Amy Pieters | Nancy van der Burg | Karlijn Swinkels |
| 2022 | Riejanne Markus | Shirin van Anrooij | Lorena Wiebes |
| 2023 | Demi Vollering | Lorena Wiebes | Marianne Vos |
| 2024 | Chantal van den Broek-Blaak | Mischa Bredewold | Nina Kessler |
| 2025 | Lorena Wiebes | Charlotte Kool | Nienke Veenhoven |
| 2026 | Lieke Nooijen | Femke Markus | Loes Adegeest |

== See also ==
- Dutch National Time Trial Championships
- National road cycling championships
