= Dutch National Track Championships – Women's individual pursuit =

The Dutch National Track Championships – Women's individual pursuit is the Dutch national championship individual pursuit event held annually at the Dutch National Track Championships.

== Medalists ==
| Championships | Gold | Silver | Bronze |
|---|---|---|---|
| 1966 | Keetie van Oosten-Hage | | |
| 1967 | Keetie van Oosten-Hage | | |
| 1968 | Keetie van Oosten-Hage | | |
| 1969 | Keetie van Oosten-Hage | | |
| 1970 | Keetie van Oosten-Hage | | |
| 1971 | Keetie van Oosten-Hage | | |
| 1972 | Keetie van Oosten-Hage | Minie Brinkhoff | |
| 1973 | Keetie van Oosten-Hage | | Minie Brinkhoff |
| 1974 | Keetie van Oosten-Hage | | Minie Brinkhoff |
| 1975 | Keetie van Oosten-Hage | | |
| 1976 | Keetie van Oosten-Hage | | |
| 1977 | Keetie van Oosten-Hage | | |
| 1978 | Anne Riemersma | Keetie van Oosten-Hage | Petra de Bruin |
| 1979 | Anne Riemersma | Hennie Top | Petra de Bruin |
| 1980 | Anne Riemersma | Petra de Bruin | Monique Kaufmann |
| 1981 | Petra De Bruin | Monique Kaufmann | Hennie Top |
| 1982 | Hennie Top | Petra De Bruin | Thea van Rijnsoever |
| 1983 | Monique Kaufmann | Petra De Bruin | Mieke Havik] |
| 1984 | Mieke Havik | | |
| 1985 | Petra De Bruin | Monique Kaufmann | Linda Van de Berg |
| 1986 | Linda van de Berg | Petra De Bruin | Monique Kaufmann |
| 1987 | Petra De Bruin | Linda van de Berg | Gré Tijmes |
| 1989 | Petra De Bruin | Esther van Verseveld | Linda van de Berg |
| 1990 | Leontien Zijlaard-van Moorsel | | |
| 1991 Alkmaar | Leontien Zijlaard-van Moorsel | Ingrid Haringa | Monique Knol |
| 1992 Alkmaar | Leontien Zijlaard-van Moorsel | Ingrid Haringa | Petra Grimbergen |
| 1993 Alkmaar | Maria Jongeling | Ingrid Haringa | Petra Grimbergen |
| 1994 | Maria Jongeling | Natascha den Ouden | Saskia van de Maat |
| 1995 | Maria Jongeling | Jet Jongeling | Mariëlle van Scheppingen |
| 1996 | Ingrid Haringa | Jet Jongeling | Mariëlle van Scheppingen |
| 1997 | Leontien Zijlaard-van Moorsel | Karin Leine | Anouska van der Zee |
| 1998 | Leontien Zijlaard-van Moorsel | Anouska van der Zee | Mariëlle van Scheppingen |
| 1999 | Leontien Zijlaard-van Moorsel | Anouska van der Zee | Marije Gemser |
| 2000 | Leontien Zijlaard-van Moorsel | Anouska van der Zee | Debby Mansveld |
| 2001 | Leontien Zijlaard-van Moorsel | Mariëlle van Scheppingen | Anouska van der Zee |
| 2002 | Leontien Zijlaard-van Moorsel | Anouska van der Zee | Vera Koedooder |
| 2003 Amsterdam | Adrie Visser | Vera Koedooder | Loes Gunnewijk |
| 2004 Alkmaar | Adrie Visser | Marlijn Binnendijk | Vera Koedooder |
| 2005 Amsterdam | Adrie Visser | Marlijn Binnendijk | Roxane Knetemann |
| 2006 Alkmaar | Vera Koedooder | Marlijn Binnendijk | Ellen van Dijk |
| 2007 Alkmaar | Ellen van Dijk | Marianne Vos | Kirsten Wild |
| 2008 Apeldoorn | Ellen van Dijk | Kirsten Wild | Vera Koedooder |
| 2009 Alkmaar | Kirsten Wild | Vera Koedooder | Amy Pieters |
| 2010 Apeldoorn | Ellen van Dijk | Kirsten Wild | Vera Koedooder |
| 2011 Apeldoorn | Ellen van Dijk | Kirsten Wild | Amy Pieters |
| 2012 Apeldoorn | Kirsten Wild | Amy Pieters | Laura van der Kamp |
| 2013 Apeldoorn | Kirsten Wild | Amy Pieters | Winanda Spoor |
| 2014 Apeldoorn | Kirsten Wild | Amy Pieters | Winanda Spoor |
| 2015 Alkmaar | Kirsten Wild | Amy Pieters | Judith Bloem |
| 2016 | Kirsten Wild | Marjolein van 't Geloof | Michelle de Graaf |
| 2017 | Amy Pieters | Loes Adegeest | Michelle de Graaf |
| 2018 | Amy Pieters | Loes Adegeest | Marjolein van 't Geloof |
| 2019 | Amy Pieters | Juliet Eickhof | Michelle de Graaf |
| 2021 | Daniek Hengeveld | Juliet Eickhof | Tessa Dijksman |
| 2022 | Marit Raaijmakers | Lisa van Belle | Tessa Dijksman |
| 2023 | Mischa Bredewold | Marjolein van 't Geloof | Juliet Eickhof |

Results from cyclebase.nl and cyclingarchives.com.

== Multiple champions ==
| Wins | Name | Years |
|---|---|---|
| 12 | Keetie van Oosten-Hage | 1966-1977 |
| 9 | Leontien Van Moorsel | 1990-1992, 1997-2002 |
| 6 | Kirsten Wild | 2009, 2012-2016 |
| 4 | Ellen van Dijk | 2007, 2008, 2010, 2011 |
| 4 | Petra De Bruin | 1981, 1985, 1987, 1989 |
| 3 | Anne Riemersma | 1978, 1979, 1980 |
| 3 | Maria Jongeling | 1993, 1994, 1995 |
| 3 | Adrie Visser | 2003, 2004, 2005 |
| 3 | Amy Pieters | 2017, 2018, 2019 |
