= Sport in the Netherlands =

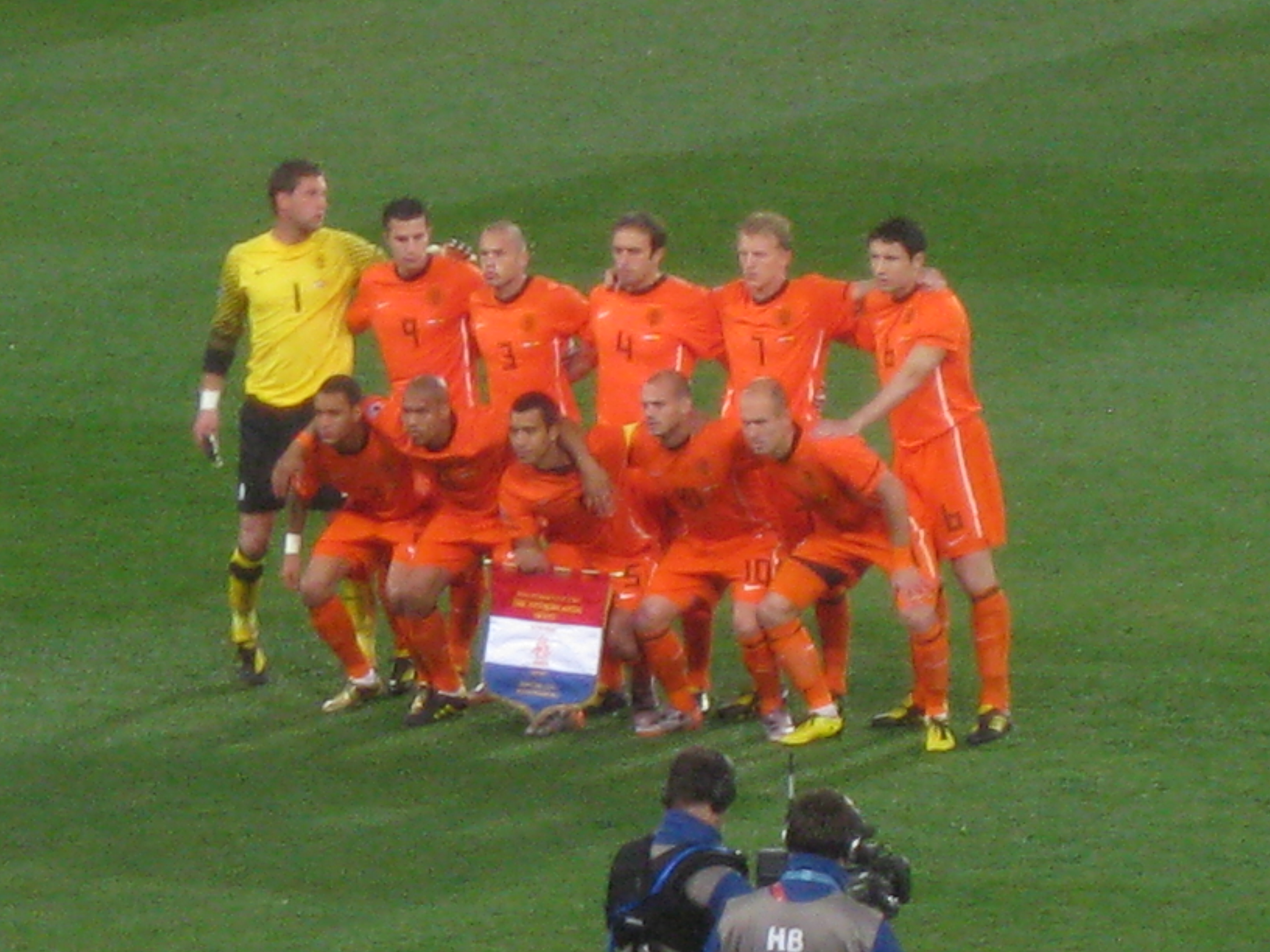
Men's national football team

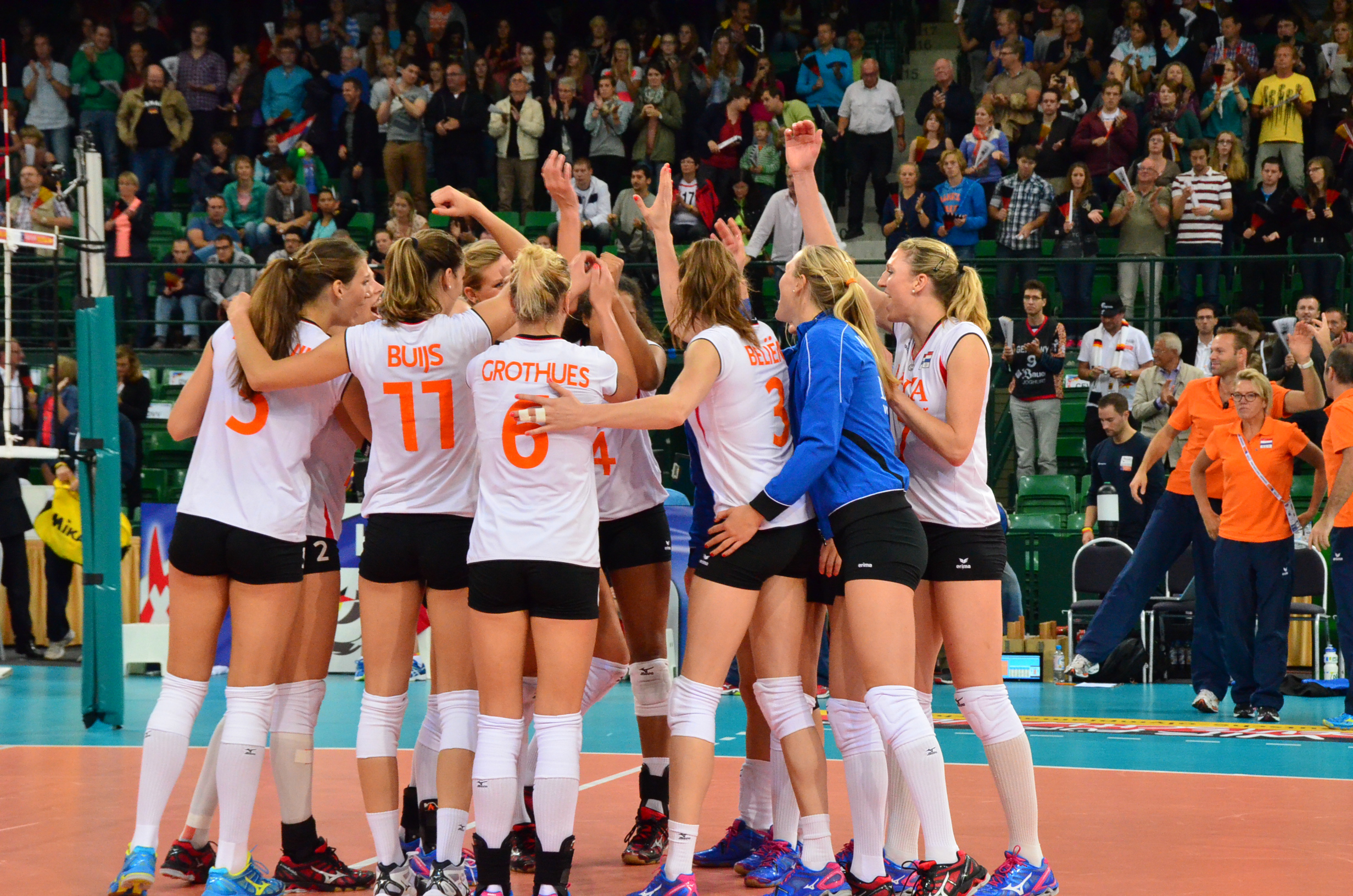
Women's national volleyball team

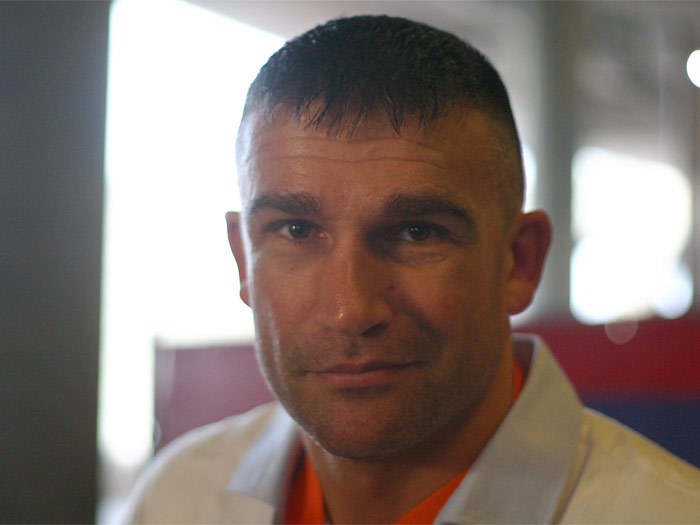
Peter Aerts is considered to be one of the greatest kickboxers ever.

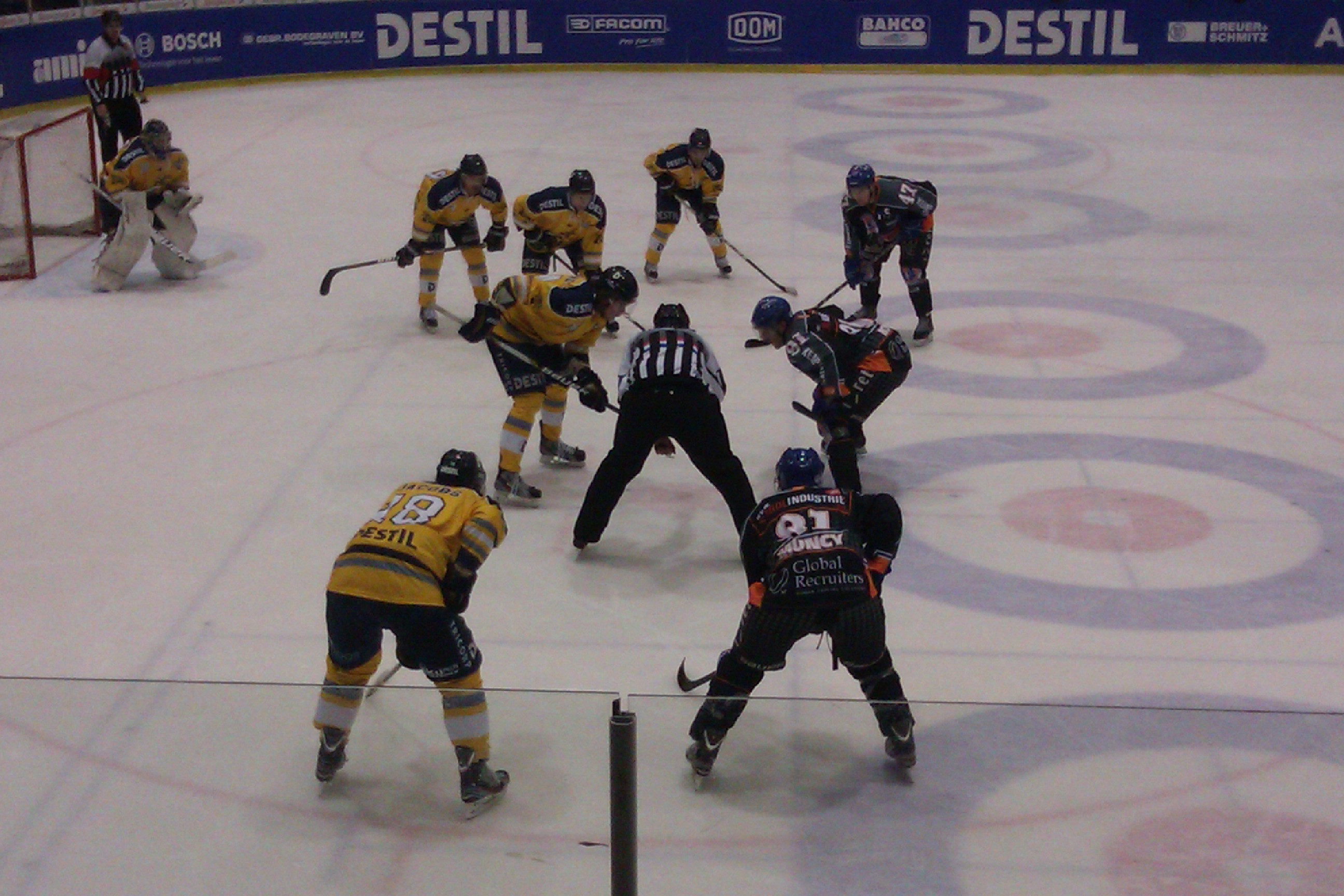
Match of the Eredivisie ice hockey league

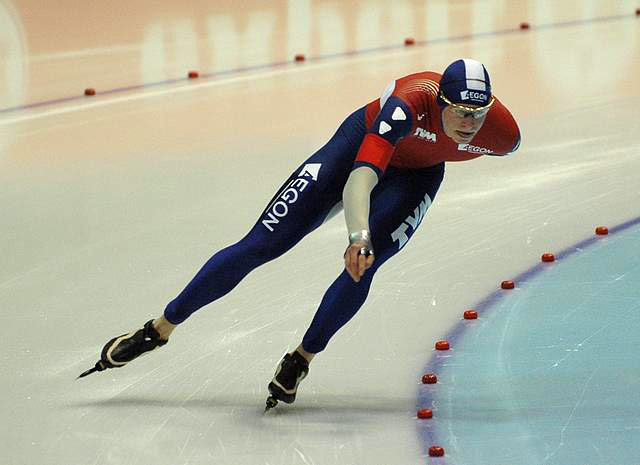
Sven Kramer, speed skater

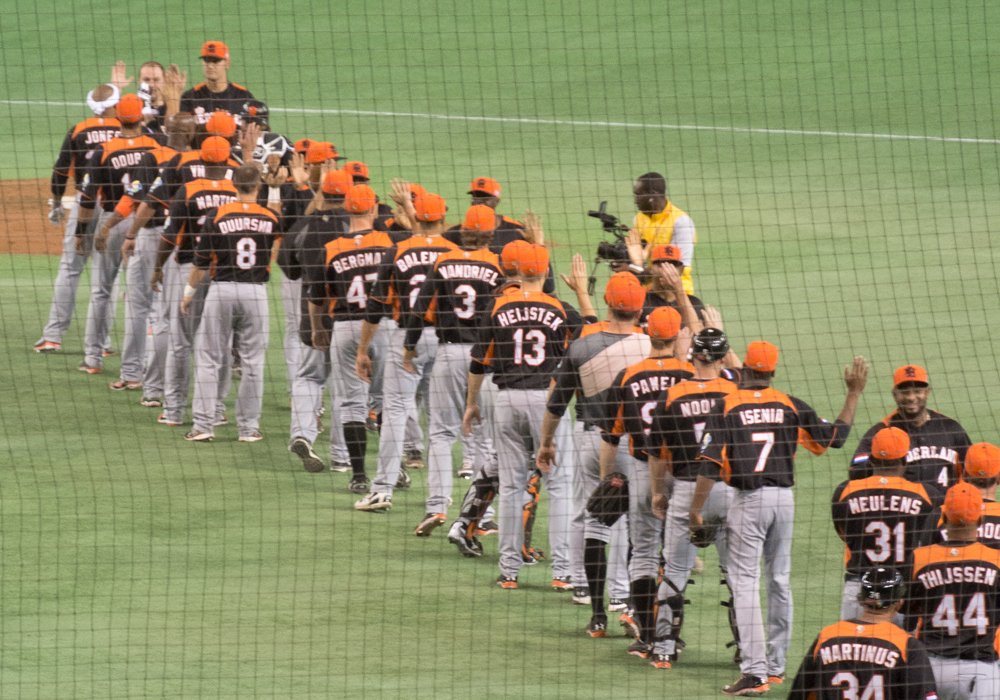
The Netherlands national baseball team during the 2013 World Baseball Classic.

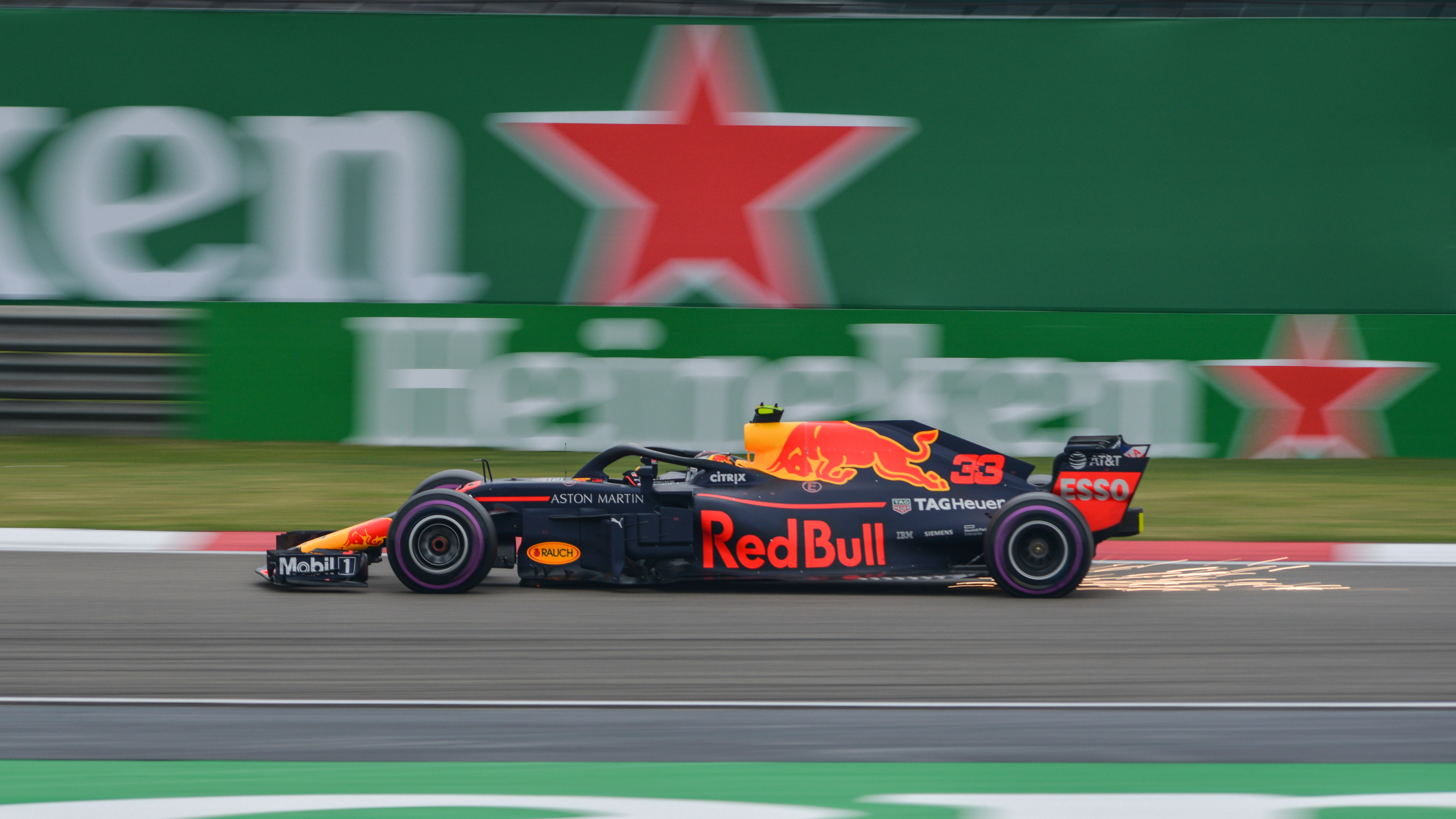
Max Verstappen, Formula One World Champion driver for Red Bull Racing.

Approximately 5 million of the 17 million people in the Netherlands are registered to one of the 35,000 sports clubs in the country. About two thirds of the population older than 15 years participates in sports weekly.

Football is the most popular sport in the Netherlands, with field hockey (including indoor hockey) and volleyball as the second and third most popular team sports. Speed skating, cycling, tennis and golf are the four most widely played individual sports. A number of native Dutch sports are also practiced, such as fierljeppen (polsstokverspringen), beugelen, kaatsen, klootschieten, kolven and korfball.

Organization of sports began at the end of the 19th century and the beginning of the 20th century. Federations for sports were established (such as the speed skating federation in 1882), rules were unified and sports clubs came into existence. A Dutch National Olympic Committee was established in 1912. Thus far, the nation has won 356 medals at the Summer Olympic Games and another 147 medals at the Winter Olympic Games.

An influential figure in Dutch sport was Pim Mulier. In 1879, he founded the first rugby union and football club in the Netherlands, and he was involved in forming the first tennis club in 1884. He also established the predecessor of the Royal Dutch Football Association five years later, and introduced field hockey in 1896, as well as bandy. His hometown Haarlem and the English Bury Fen Bandy Club played the first international match.

== Team sports ==
=== Football ===
The Royal Dutch Football Association (KNVB) is the largest sports federation in the country with 1,076,759 players (in 2005). According to the KNVB's website, it has over 1.2 million members as of 2016. The organization came into being on 19 December 1899, and was one of the founding members of FIFA (the world Football Association) in 1904.

Dutch football teams won three Olympic bronze medals in 1908, 1912 and 1920. Other successes came in the 1970s, when the national team played in the 1974 and 1978 FIFA World Cup finals, losing to the tournament's host on both occasions. In the same period, Dutch league sides Ajax and Feyenoord won European Cups from 1970 to 1973. In 1988, the national team won the only international title so far at the European Championships. PSV won the European Cup that year too. Ajax won the European Cup again in 1995.

Despite their wealth of individual talent, the Dutch national men team have only been able to claim one trophy in their entire history. This came at the UEFA Euro 1988 in which they defeated the Soviet Union to claim the coveted Henri Delaunay Trophy. In 2017 the Dutch national woman team equalized this result when they beat Denmark, claiming their European title on home ground.

Many Dutch football players have gained international fame, such as Johan Cruyff, Marco van Basten, Ruud Gullit, Dennis Bergkamp, Patrick Kluivert, Ruud van Nistelrooy, Clarence Seedorf, Wesley Sneijder, Arjen Robben, Robin van Persie and Frenkie de Jong. Rinus Michels was named Coach of the Century by FIFA in 1999. Additional football notoriety came with the Dutch team's participation in the 2010 World Cup finals, in which they lost to Spain, giving Spain its first World Cup title. In June 2019 the Netherlands reached their 6th major final, where they lost to Portugal in the UEFA Nations League final. A month later the national woman team reached their first World Cup Final against USA.

Football stadiums Johan Cruyff Arena and De Kuip have UEFA's 5-star rating, enabling them to host finals of the UEFA Champions League and the European Championship.

=== Baseball ===
The Royal Dutch Baseball Federation was established on 12 March 1912. They merged with the softball federation to form the Royal Dutch Baseball and Softball Federation in 1971 In 2008 there were over 24,000 players active at one of the 184 clubs in the country.

The Netherlands boasts the most successful national baseball team in Europe, winning the European Baseball Championship 20 times and frequently representing the continent in international competitions such as the World Baseball Classic and Baseball World Cup. There is a domestic professional baseball league whose best team, Neptunus of Rotterdam, regularly contends for the European club championship, including five consecutive titles from 2000 to 2004.

Baseball is especially popular on the island of Curaçao. In 2005, the Pabao Little League Champions of Willemstad advanced all the way to the championship game in the Little League World Series. Former Atlanta Braves outfielder Andruw Jones, now of the Tohoku Rakuten Golden Eagles in Japan's Pacific League, is arguably the most successful and popular baseball player to emerge from Curaçao, and in 2006 was a member of the Netherlands national team that participated in the inaugural World Baseball Classic. Jair Jurrjens, pitcher for the Atlanta Braves, became the first pitcher from Curaçao to pitch in the major leagues. John Houseman became the first Dutch-born player in the Major Leagues when he made his debut for the Chicago Colts in 1894. Bert Blyleven was an All-Star, a two-time World Series champion and was elected to the National Baseball Hall of Fame in 2011.

In 2009, the Netherlands twice upset the Dominican Republic in the 2009 World Baseball Classic. The Dominican Republic's entire roster played in Major League Baseball (MLB), while the Netherlands only had one player on an MLB roster. The Dominican teams' combined salary total in the MLB was about $84 million, while the Netherlands totals for $400,000. The Dominican Republic were highly favoured but in its first game against the Dominican, the Dutch won 3–2. The Dominican Republic won its next game against Panama to set up a rematch against the Netherlands. The Dutch stunned the Dominicans again and won 2–1 in extra innings. At the 2013 World Baseball Classic the Netherlands performed even better. With a mix of experienced veterans and talented youngsters they progressed through the preliminary rounds to the semi-final, where the team lost to the Dominican Republic. The team again reached the semifinals at the 2017 World Baseball Classic, but again fell one game shy of the championship, losing this time to Puerto Rico.

=== Field hockey ===
The Royal Dutch Hockey Federation was formed on 8 October 1898 and is, with 185,923 members (in 2005), the fifth largest sports federation. Men's Hoofdklasse Hockey and Women's Hoofdklasse Hockey are the country's primary hockey competitions, which are contested by 12 clubs in both the male and female league.

As of 2024, the Netherlands women's national field hockey team is the most successful team in World Cup and Olympic history, having won the title nine and five times respectively. The Dutch male hockey team has won both the World Cup and Olympic gold on three occasions. Several Dutch hockey league clubs have won the European Cup. At the Paris 2024 Olympics both the men's and women's teams won the gold medal.

=== Korfball ===
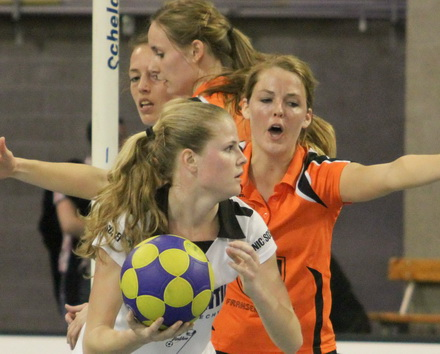
Dutch korfball match "De Korfrakkers" (Erp) vs. "Swift" (Velden)

Korfball is a mixed gender or only female ball sport, with similarities to netball and basketball. It is played by two teams of eight players with four females and four males in each team or with eight female players in each team. The objective is to throw a ball through a bottomless basket that is mounted on a 3.5 m (11.5 feet) high pole. Mixed gender korfball is more generally played in the north of the Netherlands, while all female korfball is generally played in the south of the Netherlands. The sport was invented by Dutch schoolteacher Nico Broekhuysen in 1902. In the Netherlands, there are around 580 clubs and over 100,000 people playing korfball. The sport is also very popular in Belgium and Taiwan, and is played in 54 other countries. The Dutch korfball union is called Koninklijk Nederlands Korfbalverbond (KNKV).

=== Basketball ===
Basketball is also a popular sport in the Netherlands. The national team had its most successful time during the 1980s. At the 1983 European Basketball Championship the team finished in the final four and qualified to the 1986 FIBA World Championship where the Dutch left behind strong competition such as Team Australia and Team Germany. During that time, the Dutch had its strong players in Jelle Esveldt and a young Rik Smits. Smits later became an NBA All-Star and emerged as the Dutch basketball-icon for years to come.

Since 2000, basketball in the Netherlands went through some revival and has been home to several National Basketball Association (NBA) players, including Francisco Elson and Dan Gadzuric.

=== Handball ===
While the men's national handball team has only qualified for the World Championship once and also once for the European Championship and never for the Olympic Games, the women's team have been more successful, with a gold medal at the 2019 World Women's Handball Championship as the best result.

=== Volleyball ===
Volleyball is the third most participated team sport in the country. Founded on 6 September 1947, the Dutch Volleyball Federation is with 128,693 players (in 2005) the ninth largest sports association. The A-League is the highest division in which eight men's and women's teams compete for the national championships.

The national men's team is the most successful exponent, winning the silver medal at the 1992 Summer Olympics and the gold medal four years later in Atlanta. The biggest success of the women's national team was winning the European Championship in 1995 and the World Grand Prix in 2007

The Netherlands featured national teams in beach volleyball that competed at the women's and men's section at the 2018–2020 CEV Beach Volleyball Continental Cup.

=== Cricket ===
The Royal Dutch Cricket Federation was formed in 1883. In 2021 the federation had 5000 members, which indicates that cricket is a minority sport in the Netherland yet still growing. The premier division is called the Topklasse, in which ten teams compete for the national championships.

The Netherlands national cricket team qualified for the cricket World Cup on five occasions; 1996, 2003, 2007, 2011 and 2023. The country has been considered one of the stronger associate in the world and in Europe alongside Scotland. Netherlands is ranked within the top 15 teams in the world and has co-hosted the ICC Cricket World Cup in 1999.

Most recently at the 2009 World Twenty20 in England, the Dutch team made a name for themselves by their victory over hosts, England, in the opening match of the tournament. Though they failed to qualify for the Super Eight stage afterward, their win against England, considered one of the biggest wins in Dutch cricket history. Recently the Dutch have managed to beat two time world champions West Indies in the ICC Men's Cricket World Cup Qualifiers Zimbabwe 2023 considered ones of the biggest upsets in Cricket history due to it eventually leading to the West Indies not being able to qualify for the World Cup in India 2023.

In ICC Men's Cricket World Cup 2023 Dutch team led by captain Scott Edwards has surprised the cricket world by beating South Africa and Bangladesh by big margins.

=== Bandy ===
In terms of licensed athletes, bandy is the second biggest winter sport in the world.

Bandy was introduced to the Netherlands in the 1890s and enjoyed some following for a couple of decades before ice hockey took over as the most popular winter team sport in the 1920s. However, bandy lived on in the Netherlands, and in the 1970s, it got a more organised form again. Bandy Bond Nederland became the first non-founding member of Federation of International Bandy in 1973. The national team normally plays in Division B of the World Championships. After winning the division in 2018, the team played in Division A in 2019. In 2025 a new Division B gold medal came.

== Individual sports ==
=== Ice skating ===
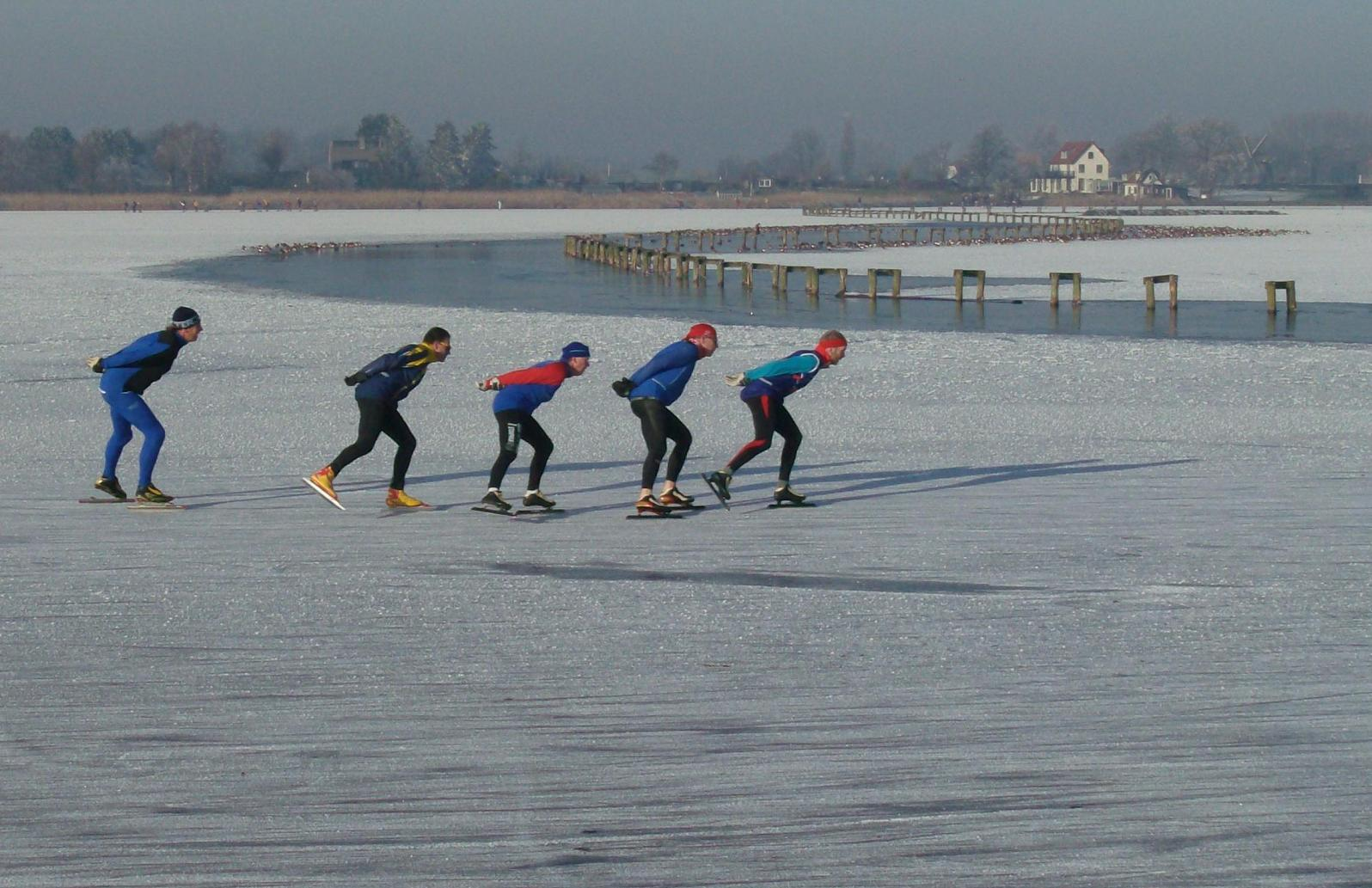
Ice skating is one of the most popular sports.

The Royal Dutch Speed Skating Association (KNSB) was formed on 17 September 1882. With 161,673 members they are the seventh largest sports federation (in 2005).

==== Speed skating ====
The first official known speed skating competition ever for women was held in Leeuwarden from 1 to 2 February 1805 and was won by Trijntje Pieters Westra.

After a successful period around 1900, with Jaap Eden and Coen de Koning as World Champions, Dutch speed skating successes became numerous in the 1960s. Champions Kees Verkerk and Ard Schenk were immensely popular, causing a real speed skating hype in the country. Successes continue up to today, with the likes of Yvonne van Gennip (3 Olympic gold medals in 1988), Rintje Ritsma (4-time World Allround Champion), Jochem Uytdehaage (2 Olympic gold medals in 2002), Marianne Timmer (3 Olympic gold medals in 1998 and 2006), Ireen Wüst (5 Olympic golds in 2006, 2010, 2014, 2018 and 6 World Allround Speed Skating Championships) and Sven Kramer (4 Olympic gold medals in 2010, 2014, 2018 and 9 World Allround Championships). The Dutch speed skaters' performance at the 2014 Winter Olympics, where they won 8 out of 12 events, 23 out of 36 medals, including 4 clean sweeps, is the most dominant performance in a single sport in Olympic history. Thialf Stadium in Heerenveen was the second indoor 400m speed skating oval in the world, the first to host an international championship and remains a world-class facility today. The stadium will host the long track speed skating competition at the 2030 Winter Olympics.

Dutch speed skaters have won 77 world single distance championships (since 1996).

==== Figure skating ====
Sjoukje Dijkstra is the most successful Dutch figure skater, winning the World Championships three times, the European Championships five times and two Olympic medals. Her Olympic gold in 1964 in Innsbruck was the first time an athlete from the Netherlands won gold at an Olympic Winter Games. Dianne de Leeuw won the silver medal in figure skating at the 1976 Winter Olympics.

=== Cycling ===
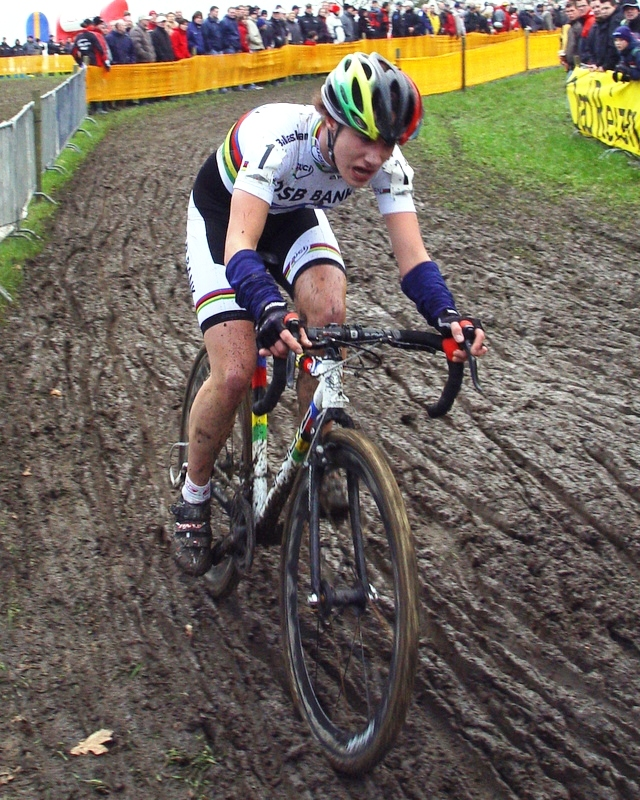
Marianne Vos, one of the most successful female cyclists of all-time

The Royal Dutch Cycling Union was instituted on 26 January 1928. Two Dutch road racing cyclists have won the Tour de France: Jan Janssen and Joop Zoetemelk. In 2017, Tom Dumoulin won the Giro d'Italia, becoming the first Dutchman to win the race and the first Dutch Grand Tour winner since Zoetemelk's Tour win in 1980. Eight Dutchmen have been World Champion on the road (Theo Middelkamp (1947), Jan Janssen (1964), Harm Ottenbros (1969), Hennie Kuiper (1975), Gerrie Knetemann (1978), Jan Raas (1979), Joop Zoetemelk (1985) and Mathieu van der Poel (2023)), but only one Dutchman has won the time trial World Championship Tom Dumoulin (2017). Nine women have been road race World Champions (Keetie van Oosten-Hage (1968, 1976), Tineke Fopma (1975), Petra de Bruijn (1979), Leontien van Moorsel (1991, 1993), Marianne Vos (2006, 2012, 2013), Chantal Blaak (2017), Anna van der Breggen (2018, 2020), Annemiek van Vleuten (2019, 2022) and Demi Vollering (2026)) and four have been World Champions in the time trial (Leontien van Moorsel (1998, 1999), Ellen van Dijk (2013, 2021, 2022), Annemiek van Vleuten (2017, 2018) and Anna van der Breggen (2020)). At the Olympic Games the Netherlands has won 23 gold medals in cycling (ten in road cycling, 11 in track cycling and one each in mountain biking and BMX). Only three countries have won more gold cycling medals at the Olympics. Erik Dekker won the 2001 Cycling World Cup. Mathieu van der Poel is a seven-time world champion in cyclo-cross and Dutch women have won more medals than any other country at the cyclo-cross World championships.

=== Tennis ===
The Royal Dutch Tennis Federation was founded on 5 June 1899 and is, with 709,277 members (in 2005), the second largest sports federation in the Netherlands.

One of the most successful tennis players was Tom Okker, nicknamed The Flying Dutchman who was ranked among the world's top 10 singles players for seven consecutive years from 1968 through 1974, reaching a career high of World No. 3 in 1969. Betty Stöve reached the ladies' singles final at Wimbledon in 1977 and won 10 Grand Slam titles in women's doubles and mixed doubles between 1972 and 1981. Also noticeable is Richard Krajicek, who won Wimbledon in 1996, and the Paul Haarhuis/Jacco Eltingh doubles team, which won five Grand Slam titles and two world championships. Esther Vergeer is a four-time Paralympics tennis champion.

Netherlands is home to several tennis tournaments, including The ABN AMRO World Tennis Tournament in Rotterdam, one of the best visited indoor tournaments in the world.

=== Athletics ===
The Royal Dutch Athletics Federation came into existence on 28 April 1901 and is, with 108,934 members (in 2005), the 13th largest sports federation.

Most successful competitor was Fanny Blankers-Koen, who won four gold medals at the 1948 Summer Olympics. In 1999, she was voted "Female Athlete of the Century" by the International Association of Athletics Federations. Other Dutch world outdoor, world indoor, and/or Olympic champions are Ria Stalman (1984), Elly van Hulst (1985, 1989), Nelli Cooman (1987, 1989), Ellen van Langen (1992), Rens Blom (2005), Nadine Broersen (2014), Dafne Schippers (2015, 2017), Sifan Hassan (2016, 2019, 2020, 2024), Femke Broeders-Bol (2023, 2024, 2025), Jessica Schilder (2025), and Sofie Dokter (2026).

Road races are the Amsterdam Marathon (platinum label), the Rotterdam Marathon, (gold label), the Enschede Marathon (elite label), the Egmond Half Marathon, the 10 mi Dam tot Damloop in Amsterdam, and the 15 km Zevenheuvelenloop in Nijmegen. The Fanny Blankers-Koen Games (gold meeting) in Hengelo is a track and field meeting.

=== Equestrianism ===
The Royal Dutch Equestrian Federation in its present form was founded after a fusion on 1 January 2002. It is the sixth largest sports federation in the country, with 180,023 members in 2005. Numerous Dutch horseback riders have become world and Olympic champions in their field, including Charles Pahud de Mortanges, Anky van Grunsven, Jos Lansink, Piet Raymakers, Jeroen Dubbeldam and Gerco Schröder.

=== Golf ===
Joost Luiten has won four tournaments in the European Tour, also he has represented Europe at the 2013 Seve Trophy and 2014 EurAsia Cup. Meanwhile, Christel Boeljon has four wins in the Ladies European Tour and represented Europe at the 2011 Solheim Cup.

The national professional golf tournaments in the Netherlands are the KLM Open (European Tour), Dutch Ladies Open (Ladies European Tour) and Dutch Senior Open (European Senior Tour).

=== Swimming ===
Formed on 14 August 1888, The Royal Dutch Swimming Federation has 148,599 members and is the eight largest sports federation. Famous competitors include Rie Mastenbroek, who won the gold medal at the 1936 Summer Olympics in the 100 m freestyle, 400 m and 4 × 100 m freestyle. Recent champions include triple Olympic gold medalists Pieter van den Hoogenband and Ranomi Kromowidjojo, four-time Olympic champion Inge de Bruijn, and former world record holder of the 50 metres freestyle, Marleen Veldhuis.

=== Kickboxing ===
Jan Plas, who learned kickboxing from Kenji Kurosaki, brought kickboxing to the Netherlands in 1978 where he founded Mejiro Gym and the NKBB (The Dutch Kickboxing Association). Ever since its inception in 1993, Dutch kickboxers have dominated the K-1 scene, causing "Wimbledon effects", with two record holding title champions Ernesto Hoost and Semmy Schilt, other world champions and contenders include Peter Aerts, Remy Bonjasky, Andy Souwer, Albert Kraus, Rob Kaman, Ramon Dekkers, Alistair Overeem, Badr Hari, Rico Verhoeven and many more world champions. The Netherlands are considered one of the best countries in the world when it comes to kickboxing.

=== Judo ===
The Dutch Judo Federation in its current form was instituted on 15 September 1979. Anton Geesink was the first non-Japanese competitor to become World Champion in Judo in 1961. Other notable judoka include Angelique Seriese, Wim Ruska, Dennis van der Geest and Mark Huizinga.

=== Walking ===
Walking on a defined route as part of an organised event is a popular activity in the Netherlands. The main national walking organisation is the Royal Dutch Walking Association (Koninklijke Wandel Bond Nederland, or KWBN), which is affiliated to the Dutch Olympic Committee/Dutch Sports Federation. KWBN affiliated groups organise over 1,500 events a year, attracting an estimated 500,000 participants. This includes the annual Nijmegen Four Day Marches, which has nearly 50,000 participants from around the world. Although these events are non-competitive, the KWBN promote walking as a sport, in order to "contribute to a healthier, fitter and more vital Netherlands”.

== Other notable athletes ==
- Jan Lammers is a former Formula One driver, who won the 24 Hours of Le Mans with Jaguar in 1988.
- Jan de Rooy is a rally truck driver, with his TurboTwin DAF racing truck he won the truck category of the Dakar Rally in 1987 and also finished 11th overall.
- Hans Stacey is a rally car driver. Won in 2007 the Dakar Rally for trucks with his MAN truck.
- Raymond van Barneveld is a professional darts player. He was ranked number one in the world from January 2008 to June 2008. He has won five world championships, four in the now-defunct British Darts Organisation and one in the Professional Darts Corporation.
- Auto racing driver Arie Luyendyk is a two-time winner of the Indianapolis 500, in 1990 and 1997.
- Rower Nico Rienks was awarded the prestigious Thomas Keller Medal by the International Rowing Federation in 2004.
- Basketball player Rik Smits was selected for the NBA All-Star Game in 1998, and helped the Indiana Pacers reach their first NBA Finals in 2000.
- Michael van Gerwen is a professional darts player. He was the number-one ranked darts player in the world from 2014 to 2021, and was the 2014, 2017 & 2019 PDC World Darts Champion.
- Ryan Ten Doeschate is a cricket player who has the highest batting average in ODI Cricket. In January 2011, ten Doeschate was signed by Kolkata Knight Riders in the Indian Premier League 2011 Auction, becoming the first Associate player to win an IPL contract. In 2012, he also became the first and till date the only Dutchman to win the Indian Premier League with KKR.
- Max Verstappen is a Formula One driver. Having made his debut in 2015 at the age of 17, he holds the record for being the youngest driver to have entered a Formula One race. In 2016, he took his first win at the Spanish Grand Prix, making him both the youngest driver and first Dutch driver to win a Formula One race. In 2021, he won the Formula One drivers' championship, the first Dutch driver to do so. He won the drivers' championship again in 2022, 2023 and 2024. Max's father, Jos Verstappen, was a Formula One driver from 1994 to 2003.
- Vivianne Miedema is a professional footballer who plays as a forward for FA WSL club Arsenal and the Netherlands women's national football team. She has scored more goals at international level for the Netherlands than any other player, across both the women's and men's teams.
- Rinus VeeKay, whose full name is Rinus van Kalmthout, is a driver in the IndyCar Series.
- Jeffrey Herlings is a professional motocross racer. He has competed in the Motocross World Championships since 2010. Herlings won the 2018 and 2021 MXGP Championships and has the most Grand Prix wins in MXGP history.

== See also ==
- Netherlands at the Olympics
- The Dutch Sportsman and Sportswoman of the Year
