= Dutch National Track Championships – Women's omnium =

The Dutch National Track Championships – Women's omnium is the Dutch national championship omnium event held annually at the Dutch National Track Championships. The event was first introduced in 1977. After 1989 the event wasn't held for 21 years. Because the omnium discipline was introduced at the 2012 Summer Olympics, the Dutch national omnium championship was recontinued in 2010.

== Medalists ==
Championships	Gold	Silver	Bronze
1977 Rotterdam	Marijke Lagerlof	Anne Riemersma	Trijntje Fopma
1978 Rotterdam	Anne Riemersma	Keetie van Oosten-Hage	
1979 Rotterdam	Keetie van Oosten-Hage	Anne Riemersma	Petra de Bruin
1981	Sandra de Neef	Petra de Bruin	Mieke Havik
1982 Rotterdam	Mieke Havik	Connie Meijer	Petra de Bruin
1983	Mieke Havik	Connie Meijer	Wendy Lisser
1988	Petra de Bruin	Monique de Bruin	Linda van de Berg
1989	Esther van Verseveld	Petra de Bruin	Linda van de Berg
2010 Alkmaar	Vera Koedooder	Ellen van Dijk	Yvonne Hijgenaar
2011 Alkmaar	Marie-Louise Konkelaar	Laura van der Kamp	Birgitta Roos
2012 Alkmaar	Kirsten Wild	Amy Pieters	Laura van der Kamp

Results from cyclingarchives.com and cyclebase.nl.

== Multiple champions ==
2 times champion: Mieke Havik
