= Profronde van Oostvoorne =

Race details
- Date: August
- Region: Oostvoorne, Netherlands
- Local name(s): Profronde van Oostvoorne (in Dutch)
- Discipline: Road race
- Type: criterium
- Web site: www.profrondeoostvoorne.com

History
- First edition: 1985
- Editions: Men: 28 (as of 2012); Women: 23 (as of 2012)
- First winner: Men; Joop Zoetemelk (NED); Women; Hege Stendaal (NOR)
- Most wins: Men; Jelle Nijdam (NED) (2 wins); Women; Marianne Vos (NED) (5 wins)
- Most recent: Men; Niki Terpstra (NED); Women; Linda Ringlever (NED)

Profronde van Oostvoorne (English: Proftour of Oostvoorne) is an elite men's and women's professional road bicycle racing event held annually in Oostvoorne, the Netherlands. The first edition was in 1985. The event is one of the post-Tour de France criteriums.

== Honours ==
=== Men's ===
Year	Winner	Second	Third
2012	Niki Terpstra (NED)	Laurens ten Dam (NED)	Tom Veelers (NED)
2011	Fränk Schleck (LUX)	Johnny Hoogerland (NED)	Laurens ten Dam (NED)
2010	Robert Gesink (NED)	Martijn Maaskant (NED)	Koos Moerenhout (NED)
2009	Martijn Maaskant (NED)	Albert Timmer (NED)	Koos Moerenhout (NED)
2008	Steven de Jongh (NED)	Martijn Maaskant (NED)	Erik Zabel (GER)
2007	Mauricio Soler (COL)	Gert Steegmans (BEL)	Bram de Groot (NED)
2006	Michael Boogerd (NED)	Philippe Gilbert (BEL)	Maarten den Bakker (NED)
2005	Léon van Bon (NED)	Pieter Weening (NED)	Bram Tankink (NED)
2004	Robbie McEwen (AUS)	Rudie Kemna (NED)	Servais Knaven (NED)
2003	Alessandro Petacchi (NED)	Jans Koerts (NED)	Maarten den Bakker (NED)
2002	Bart Voskamp (NED)	Max van Heeswijk (NED)	Stefan van Dijk (NED)
2001	Stuart O'Grady (AUS)	Servais Knaven (NED)	Maarten den Bakker (NED)
2000	Servais Knaven (NED)	Sergei Ivanov (RUS)	Maarten den Bakker (NED)
1999	Bart Voskamp (NED)	Maarten den Bakker (NED)	Ján Svorada (CZE)
1998	Koos Moerenhout (NED)	Steven de Jongh (NED)	Maarten den Bakker (NED)
1997	Erik Breukink (NED)	John Talen (NED)	Tristan Hofmann (NED)
1996	Maarten den Bakker (NED)	John Talen (NED)	Michael Boogerd (NED)
1995	Mario Cipollini (ITA)	Léon van Bon (NED)	Jans Koerts (NED)
1994	Marko Vermey (NED)	John Talen (NED)	Gerrit de Vries (NED)
1993	Gert Jakobs (NED)	Maarten den Bakker (NED)	Rob Mulders (NED)
1992	Johan Capiot (BEL)	Jean-Paul van Poppel (NED)	Jacques Hanegraaf (NED)
1991	Steven Rooks (NED)	Jean-Paul van Poppel (NED)	Wiebren Veenstra (NED)
1990	Maarten Ducrot (NED)	Gerrit Solleveld (NED)	Louis de Koning (NED)
1989	Jelle Nijdam (NED)	Eddy Schürer (NED)	Jacques Hanegraaf (NED)
1988	Matthieu Hermans (NED)	Peter Pieters (NED)	Nico Verhoeven (NED)
1987	Jelle Nijdam (NED)	Gerrie Knetemann (NED)	John Talen (NED)
1986	Gerrie Knetemann (NED)	Jelle Nijdam (NED)	Bert Oosterbosch (NED)
1985	Joop Zoetemelk (NED)	Gerrie Knetemann (NED)	Henk Lubberding (NED)

=== Women's ===
Year	Winner	Second	Third
2012	Linda Ringlever (NED)	Chantal Blaak (NED)	Natalie van Gogh (NED)
2011	Marianne Vos (NED)	Chantal Blaak (NED)	Amy Pieters (NED)
2010	Marianne Vos (NED)	Chantal Blaak (NED)	Ellen van Dijk (NED)
2009	Marianne Vos (NED)	Chantal Blaak (NED)	Katie Colclough (GBR)
2008	Chantal Blaak (NED)	Elise van Hage (NED)	Suzanne Kuiper (NED)
2007	Marianne Vos (NED)	Mirjam Melchers (NED)	Regina Bruins (NED)
2006	Marianne Vos (NED)	Suzanne de Goede (NED)	Ellen van Dijk (NED)
2005	Mirjam Melchers (NED)	Arenda Grimberg (NED)	Sissy van Alebeek (NED)
2004	Mirjam Melchers (NED)	Angela Hillenga (NED)	Sandra Rombouts (NED)
2003	Arenda Grimberg (NED)	Chantel Beltman (NED)	Anouska van der Zee (NED)
2002	Vera Koedooder (NED)	Sandra Misbach (GER)	Vanja Vonckx (BEL)
2001	Leontien Zijlaard (NED)	Sissy van Alebeek (NED)	Mariëlle van Scheppingen (NED)
2000	Leontien Zijlaard (NED)	Sissy van Alebeek (NED)	Anouska van der Zee (NED)
1999	Andrea Bosman (NED)	Leontien Zijlaard (NED)	Debby Mansveld (NED)
1998	Leontien Zijlaard (NED)	Wendy Kramp (NED)	Hester-Marieke Kroes (NED)
1997	Martine Bras (NED)	Marion Borst (NED)	Wendy Kramp (NED)
1996	Ina Teutenberg (GER)	Petra van der Giessen (NED)	Leontien van Moorsel (NED)
1995	Ingrid Haringa (NED)	Margarethe Groen (NED)	Monique Knol (NED)
1994	Astrid Hoek (NED)	Monique Knol (NED)	Henriëtte Vos (NED)
1993	Daniëlle Overgaag (NED)	Ingrid Haringa (NED)	Margarethe Groen (NED)
1992	Margarethe Groen (NED)	Monique Knol (NED)	Astrid Donkersloot (NED)
1991	Margarethe Groen (NED)	Manon de Rooij (NED)	Astrid Schop (NED)
1985	Hege Stendaal (NOR)	G. van de Mosselaar (NED)	Monique Kaufmann (NED)
