= Van Den Spiegel =

Van den Spiegel, Van de Spiegel or Van der Spiegel is a surname. Literally meaning "from the mirror", it is thought to usually refer to the home of a mirror maker. Notable people with the surname include:

- Adriaan van den Spiegel (1578–1625), Flemish physician active in Italy
- Bella van der Spiegel-Hage (born 1948), Dutch racing cyclist
- Laurens Pieter van de Spiegel (1736–1800), Dutch Grand Pensionary of Zeeland and Holland
- Tomas Van Den Spiegel (born 1978), Belgian basketball player
- Harry Vanderspeigle, a fictional alien and protagonist of Resident Alien (comics) (2012–2025) and Resident Alien (TV series) (2021–2025)
