= Yvonne Brunen =

Dutch cyclist

Personal information
- Full name: Yvonne Anna Margaretha Brunen
- Born: 4 February 1971 (age 55) Nunspeet, Netherlands

Cycling career
- Sport: Cycling
- Current team: Retired
- Discipline: Road
- Role: Rider

Professional teams
- 1997–1998: Rabobank
- 1999: The Greenery Grisley
- 2000–2001: Farm Frites-Hartol
- 2002: Power Plate-Bik
- 2003: Bik-Powerplate

Yvonne Anna Margaretha Brunen (born 4 February 1971) was a Dutch professional cyclist from Nunspeet, the Netherlands. She turned professional in 1993. She competed in two events at the 1996 Summer Olympics.

== Palmarès ==
1994
1st Dutch National Road Race Championships

1995
1st Dutch National Road Race Championships

1996
1st Dutch National Road Race Championships

1997
1st Dutch National Mountain Bike Championships
2nd Dutch National Road Race Championships

1998
3rd Dutch National Time Trial Championships

1999
3rd Dutch National Mountain Bike Championships
3rd Dutch National Road Race Championships

== See also ==
- List of Dutch Olympic cyclists
