= Monique Kaufmann =

Dutch cyclist and speed skater

Monique Kauffman
Personal information
- Born: 13 March 1963 (age 63) The Hague, the Netherlands

Cycling career
- Sport: Cycling
- Disciplines: Track cycling Road cycling Speed skating
- Role: Rider
- Rider type: endurance

Professional teams
- 1979: MS-mode - Hitachi-Beck's Bier
- 1985: Fer van Duuren - Lundbeck

Monique Kauffman (born 13 March 1963 in The Hague) is a Dutch road cyclist, track cyclist and speed skater.

== Personal ==
In 1979 she moved with her parents from The Hague to Kijkduin.

== Career ==
=== Road cycling ===
On the road she competed in the late 1970s and 1980s in criteriums and in local races in the Netherlands and was very good for her age. When she was sixteen years old she was part of the Dutch National selection. She won in Clinge on 16 July 1979 her third victory of the season by beating among others the World Champion Beate Habetz. She also won the Profronde van Almelo that year. Kauffman was aiming for a spot at the 1979 UCI Road World Championships. The years later she won several races in the Netherlands, finished third in the Parel van de Veluwe in 1985 and finished also third the same year in the Profronde van Oostvoorne.

=== Track cycling ===
On the track she was selected to compete in the individual pursuit event at the 1981 UCI Track Cycling World Championships. At the Dutch National Track Championships she won the silver medal in the individual pursuit in 1985. The year later she won the bronze medal in 1986 by over taking her opponent Wesly Post.

=== Speed skating ===
As a junior speed skater she competed at the World Junior Speed Skating Championships in Norway in 1981, finishing 19th. During the 1981 UCI Track Cycling World Championships the Dutch Speed Skating Union announced that Kauffmann was taken out of the national selection because she focussed too much upon track cycling. As an elite skater she competed at the KNSB Dutch Allround Championships in 1982, 1983 and 1984. Her best classification was seventh; both in 1982 and 1983. She competed at the KNSB Dutch Sprint Championships in 1983 finishing ninth.
