= George Damen =

Dutch cyclist (1887–1954)

Personal information
- Full name: Georgius Bernardus Damen
- Born: 18 June 1887 Rotterdam, Netherlands
- Died: 23 June 1954 (aged 67) Rotterdam, Netherlands

Cycling career
- Sport: Cycling
- Disciplines: road and track

George Damen (18 June 1887 – 23 June 1954) was a Dutch cyclist. He competed in four track events at the 1908 Summer Olympics. He was also active on the road, among other results finishing third in the 1909 Dutch National Road Race Championships.

== See also ==
- List of Dutch Olympic cyclists
