= Nancy van der Burg =

Dutch cyclist

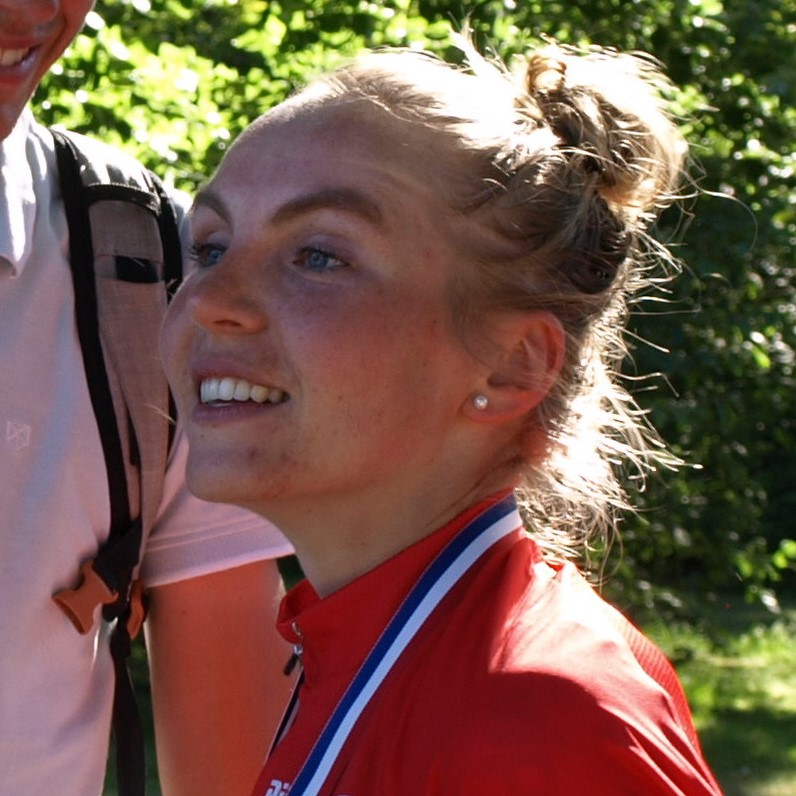
- Van der Burg at the 2019 Dutch National Road Race Championships

Personal information
- Full name: Nancy van der Burg
- Born: 18 May 1992 (age 34) Delfgauw, Netherlands

Cycling career
- Sport: Cycling
- Current team: Visma–Lease a Bike
- Discipline: Road
- Role: Rider

Amateur teams
- 2011–2016: Restore–Reppel–SK Bouw
- 2017: Jos Feron Lady Force
- 2019: Jos Feron Lady Force

Professional teams
- 2018: Parkhotel Valkenburg
- 2020: Parkhotel Valkenburg
- 2021–: Team Jumbo–Visma

Nancy van der Burg (born 18 May 1992) is a Dutch racing cyclist, who currently rides for UCI Women's Continental Team Visma–Lease a Bike.

== Career ==
She rode for Restore–Reppel–SK Bouw from 2011 to 2016, before switching to Jos Feron Lady Force for 2017. During 2017 she won stage three of the Tour de Feminin-O cenu Českého Švýcarska, in which she eventually finished in ninth in the points classification, and was second on stage one of the Tour Cycliste Féminin International de l'Ardèche. In 2018, she stepped up to Parkhotel Valkenburg to participate in the 2018 UCI Women's World Tour, but after a few months, and no top-ten finishes, she left Parkhotel Valkenburg by mutual consent as she was unable to balance racing professionally and working as a sport nutrition coach at LottoNL–Jumbo. She returned to the Jos Feron Lady Force team for 2019, and finished fourth at Draai rond de Kraai, and later sixth at the Dutch National Road Race Championships.

== Major results ==
2017
1st Stage 4 Tour de Feminin – O cenu Českého Švýcarska
2019
6th Overall Tour de Feminin – O cenu Českého Švýcarska
2021
2nd Road race, National Junior Road Championships
