= Heleen Hage =

Dutch cyclist (born 1958)

Personal information
- Born: 13 October 1958 (age 68) Sint-Maartensdijk, Netherlands

Cycling career
- Sport: Cycling
Medal record
Representing Netherlands
Women's road cycling
World Championships
Silver medal – second place	1987 Austria	Road race

Heleen Hage (born 13 October 1958) is a Dutch former road racing cyclist who was active from 1983 to 1989. In her career, she achieved second place overall 1984 Grande Boucle (women's Tour de France), winning stages 4, 13 and 15. In 1986 she became the Dutch national road cycling champion and in 1987 secured the silver medal in the road race at the World Championships. She also competed in the women's individual road race at the 1988 Summer Olympics.

She comes from a family of cyclists and is the sister of Keetie Hage, Bella Hage and Ciska Hage, and is an aunt to Jan van Velzen.

== See also ==
- List of Dutch Olympic cyclists
