= Hennie Top =

Dutch cyclist (born 1956)

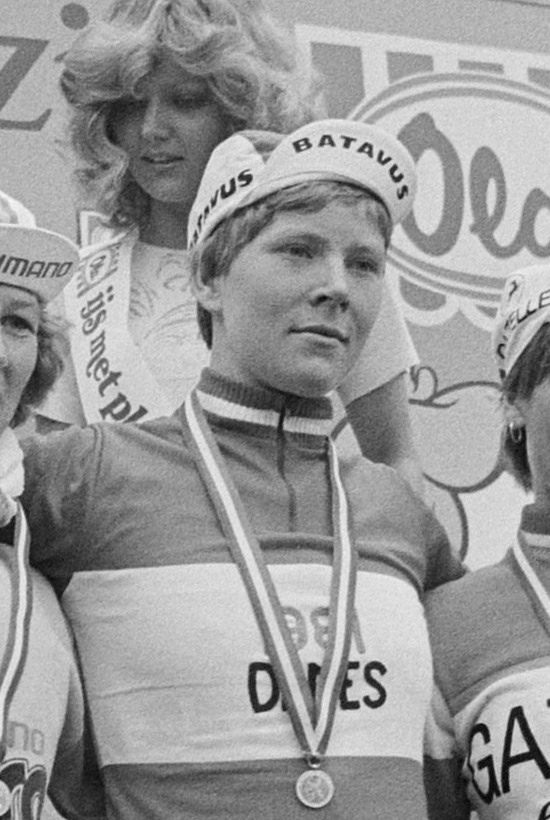
- Hennie Top in 1981

Personal information
- Full name: Hennie Top
- Born: 23 August 1956 (age 70) Wekerom, Netherlands
- Height: 175 cm (5 ft 9 in)
- Weight: 66 kg (146 lb)

Cycling career
- Sport: Cycling
- Discipline: Road
- Role: Rider

Hennie Top (born 23 August 1956) is a former professional cyclist from Wekerom, Netherlands. She competed in the women's road race at the 1984 Summer Olympics, finishing 37th. During the 1990s Top was the cycling coach of the United States women's team.

== Palmarès ==
1979
2nd Dutch National Road Race Championships

1980
1st Dutch National Road Race Championships

1981
1st Dutch National Road Race Championships

1982
1st Dutch National Road Race Championships

1984
3rd Dutch National Road Race Championships

1985
1st Stage 1, Grande Boucle Féminine
3rd Stage 4, Grande Boucle Féminine
1st Stage 16, Grande Boucle Féminine

== See also ==
- List of Dutch Olympic cyclists
