= Anouska van der Zee =

Dutch cyclist (born 1976)

Personal information
- Full name: Annuska Johanna Maria van der Zee
- Born: 5 April 1976 (age 50) Utrecht, the Netherlands

Cycling career
- Sport: Cycling
- Disciplines: Road and track
- Role: Rider
- Rider type: Endurance

Annuska Johanna Maria 'Anouska' van der Zee (born 5 April 1976 in Utrecht) is a retired Dutch racing cyclist. She participated both on track and at the road.

Van der Zee represented the Netherlands at the 2004 Summer Olympics in Athens where she took part in the road race, but did not reach the finish. After the Olympics she ended her career.

== Highlights ==
1997
1st Stage 2, GP Boekel
3rd Dutch National Track Championships, Individual Pursuit

1998
2nd European Track Championships, Individual Pursuir u-23s
2nd Dutch National Track Championships, Individual Pursuit
3rd Omloop der Groene Gemeente

1999
2nd Dutch Track Championships, Individual Pursuit
3rd Dutch Track Championships, Points Race
3rd Luba Classic

2000
2nd Dutch National Track Championships, Individual Pursuit
2nd Dutch National Time Trial Championships

2001
3rd Dutch National Track Championships, Individual Pursuit
1st Stage 1, Ster van Zeeland, Kwadendamme
2nd General classification, Ster van Zeeland
2nd Dutch National Time Trial Championships

2002
1st Stage 1, GP Boekel
2nd General classification, GP Boekel
2nd Dutch National Track Championships, Individual Pursuit
2nd Ronde rond het Ronostrand

2003
1st Stage 3, Holland Ladies Tour

2004
3rd General classification, Vuelta Castilla y Leon
2nd Omloop van Borsele

== See also ==
- List of Dutch Olympic cyclists
