= Dianne de Leeuw =

Dutch figure skater and coach

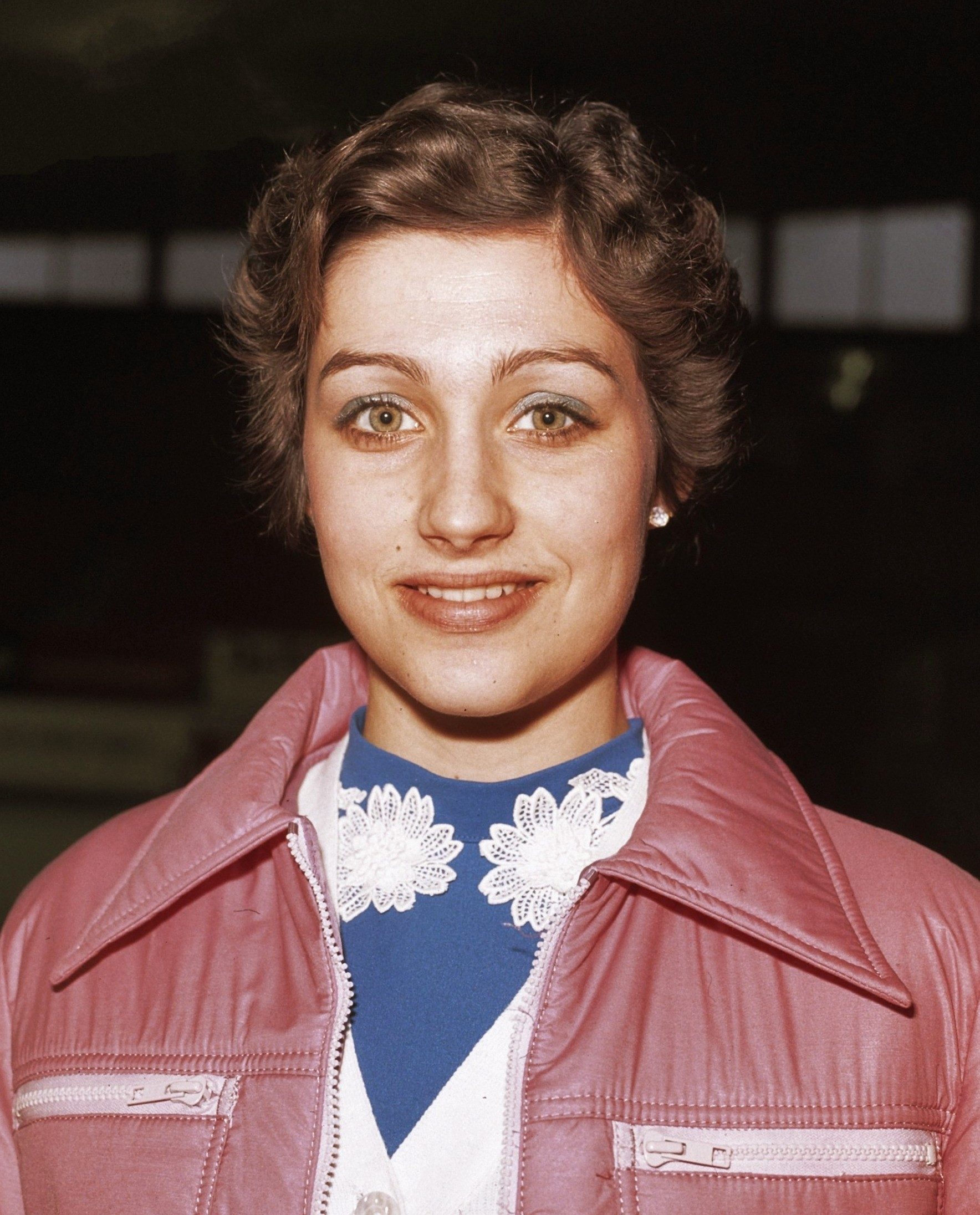
- Dianne de Leeuw in 1974

Personal information
- Full name: Dianne Margaret de Leeuw
- Born: November 19, 1955 (age 70) Orange, California, U.S.
- Height: 5 ft 5 in (1.65 m)

Figure skating career
- Country: Netherlands
- Retired: 1976
Medal record
Figure skating: Ladies' singles
Representing the Netherlands
Olympic Games
Silver medal – second place	1976 Innsbruck	Ladies' singles
World Championships
Gold medal – first place	1975 Colorado Springs	Ladies' singles
Bronze medal – third place	1976 Gothenburg	Ladies' singles
Bronze medal – third place	1974 Munich	Ladies' singles
European Championships
Gold medal – first place	1976 Geneva	Ladies' singles
Silver medal – second place	1975 Copenhagen	Ladies' singles
Silver medal – second place	1974 Zagreb	Ladies' singles

Dianne Margaret de Leeuw (born November 19, 1955) is a Dutch-American former competitive figure skater who represented the Netherlands. She is the 1975 World champion, the 1976 European champion, and the 1976 Olympic silver medalist.

== Personal life ==
De Leeuw was born in Orange, California, United States to a Dutch mother and a father with dual United States and Dutch citizenship. She married her former coach, Doug Chapman.

== Career ==
Since there were few international opportunities for U.S. skaters, de Leeuw's mother decided she should try to compete for the Netherlands. She won her first national title in the 1970–71 season and was assigned to the 1971 European Championships in Zürich, where she placed 19th. To gain a berth to the 1972 Winter Olympics, de Leeuw was required to finish in the top ten at the 1972 European Championships. She managed to place ninth and made her Olympic debut, finishing 16th. She then made her first appearance at the World Championships.

De Leeuw's international breakthrough came in the 1973–74 season. Her first ISU Championship medal was silver at the 1974 European Championships in Zagreb, behind Christine Errath. At the 1974 World Championships in Munich, she was awarded the bronze medal and stepped onto the podium with Errath and Dorothy Hamill.

In 1975, de Leeuw repeated as silver medalist at the European Championships in Copenhagen, while Errath again won gold. She became World champion at the 1975 World Championships in Colorado Springs, Colorado, finishing ahead of Hamill and Errath, and was voted the 1975 Dutch female athlete of the year.

De Leeuw won gold at the 1976 European Championships in Geneva. At the 1976 Winter Olympics in Innsbruck, she carried the Dutch flag and made daily trips to Germany for ice time. She received the silver medal, while Hamill and Errath obtained gold and bronze respectively. After taking bronze at the 1976 World Championships in Gothenburg, de Leeuw retired from ISU competition. She toured with Holiday on Ice and the Ice Follies and then became a coach, working at the Westminster Ice Palace in Westminster, California and Anaheim Ice.

== Results ==
International
Event	70–71	71–72	72–73	73–74	74–75	75–76
Olympics		16th				2nd
Worlds		17th	15th	3rd	1st	3rd
Europeans	19th	9th	6th	2nd	2nd	1st
Prague Skate				3rd		
Richmond Trophy				1st		
National
Dutch Champ.	1st	1st	1st	1st	1st	1st

Olympic Games
Preceded by Atje Keulen-Deelstra	Flagbearer for Netherlands; Innsbruck 1976	Succeeded by Piet Kleine
Awards
Preceded by Enith Brigitha	Dutch Sportswoman of the Year; 1975	Succeeded by Keetie van Oosten
