= Bella van der Spiegel-Hage =

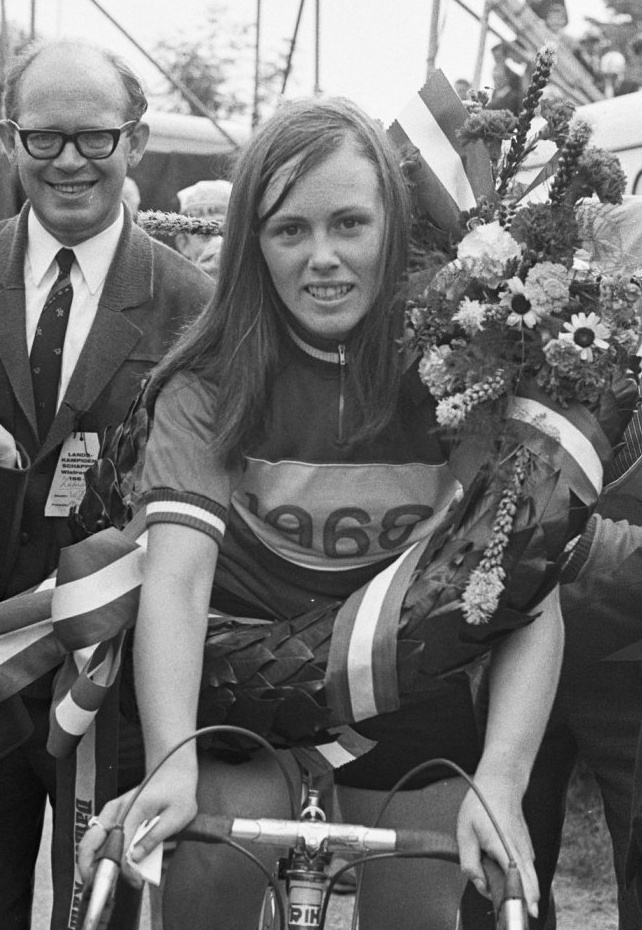
- Bella Hage with father in 1968

Personal information
- Full name: Bella van der Spiegel-Hage
- Born: 5 May 1948 (age 78) Sint-Maartensdijk, the Netherlands

Cycling career
- Sport: Cycling
- Disciplines: Road & Track
- Role: Rider
- Rider type: Pursuit/Endurance

Professional team
- 1977: Beck's Bier

Bella Hage, commonly known by her married name Bella van der Spiegel-Hage, (born 5 May 1948) is a Dutch former professional cyclist from Sint-Maartensdijk, in the province of Zeeland. She comes from a family of cyclists and is the sister of Keetie Hage, Heleen Hage and Ciska Hage, and an aunt to Jan van Velzen.

== Palmarès ==
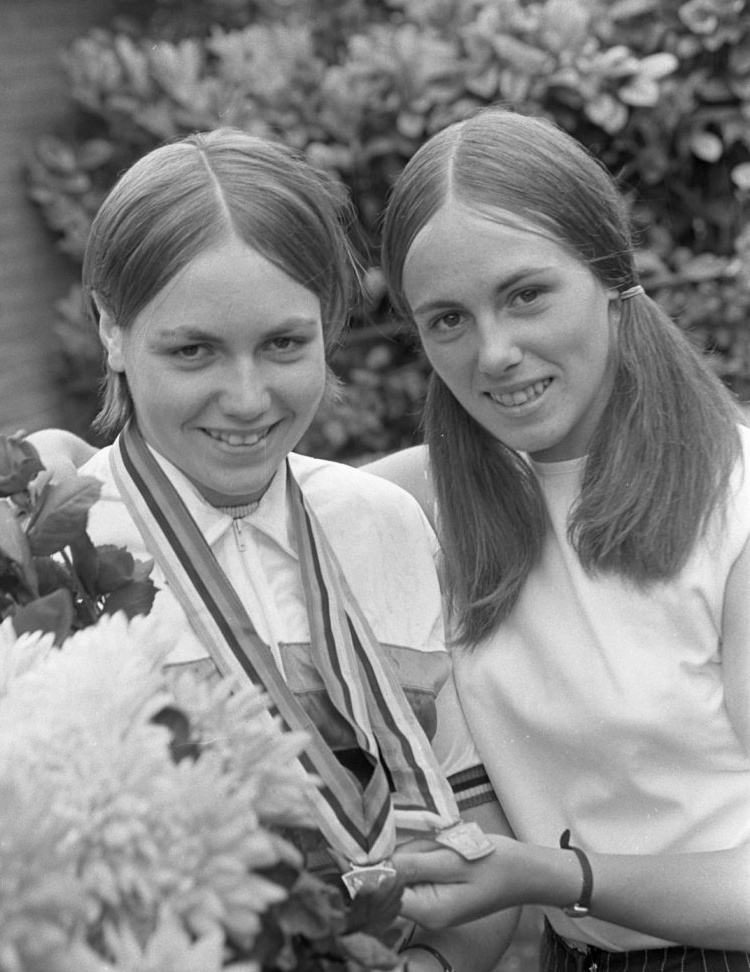
Keetie and Bella Hage (right) in 1968

1966
1st Dutch National Road Race Championships

1967
1st Dutch National Road Race Championships

1968
1st Dutch National Road Race Championships

1970
3rd Dutch National Road Race Championships

1972
2nd Dutch National Road Race Championships

1978
2nd Dutch National Road Race Championships
