= Truus van der Plaat =

Dutch cyclist

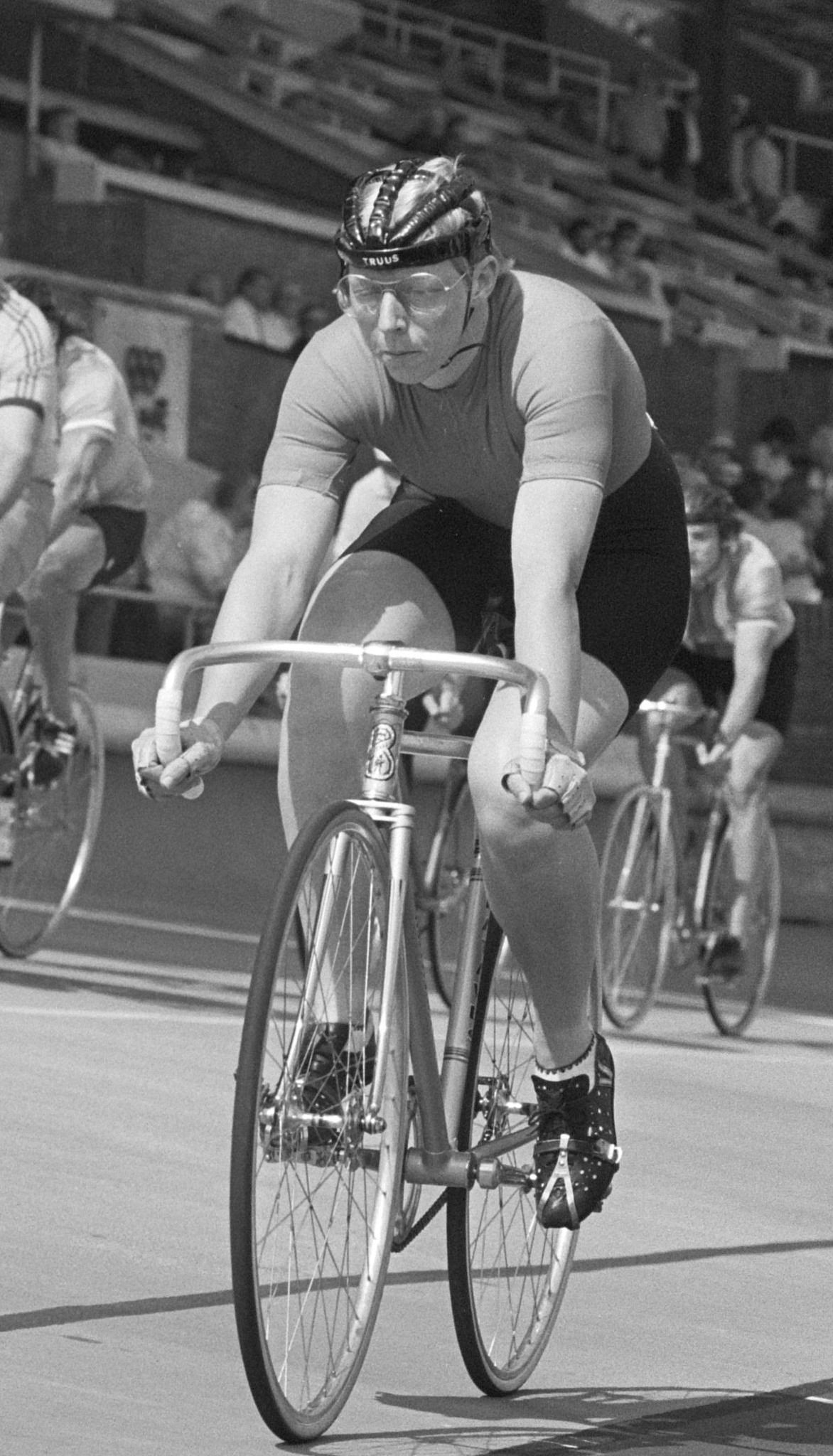
- Truus Van der Plaat in 1979

Personal information
- Born: Geldermalsen, the Netherlands

Sport
- Sport: Cycling
Medal record
Representing the Netherlands
Track World Championships
Silver medal – second place	1979 Amsterdam	Sprint

Truus van der Plaat is a retired Dutch track and road cyclist who was active between 1970 and 1980. She won a silver medal in the sprint at the 1979 world championships.

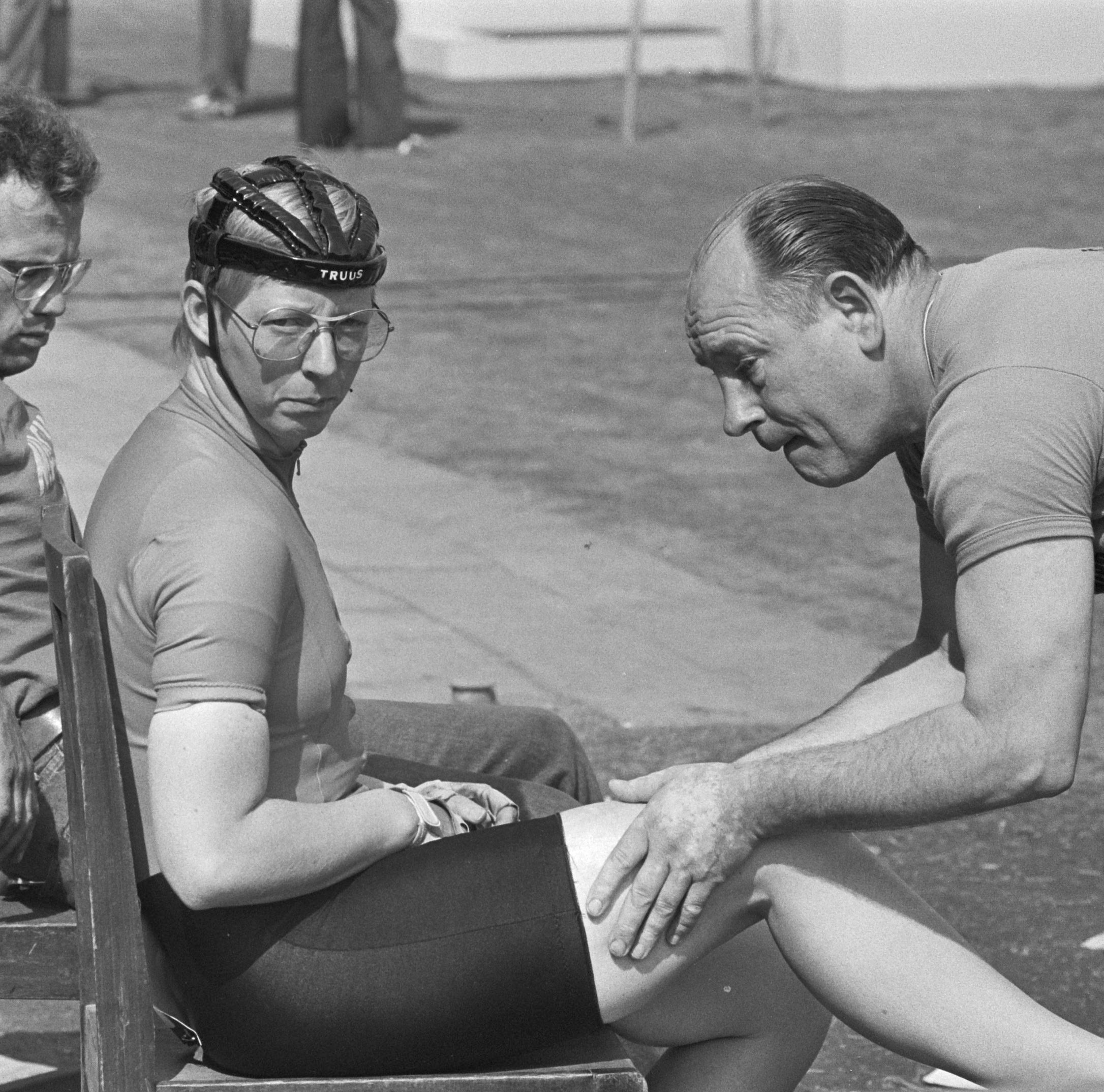
Truus van der Plaat is getting massage at the 1979 world championships
