= John Braspennincx =

Dutch cyclist

Personal information
- Born: 24 April 1914
- Died: 7 January 2008 (aged 93)

Cycling career
- Sport: Cycling
- Discipline: Road
- Role: Rider

John Braspennincx (24 April 1914 – 7 January 2008) was a Dutch racing cyclist. He rode in the 1937 Tour de France.
