= Leontine van der Lienden =

Dutch cyclist

Personal information
- Born: 4 April 1959 (age 67) Utrecht, Netherlands
- Height: 166 cm (5 ft 5 in)
- Weight: 56 kg (123 lb)

Cycling career
- Sport: Cycling

Leontine van der Lienden (born 4 April 1959 in Utrecht) is a Dutch cyclist. She competed in the women's road race at the 1984 Summer Olympics, finishing 28th. She was formerly married to fellow racing cyclist Jean-Paul van Poppel, and is the mother of cyclists Boy van Poppel and Danny van Poppel.

== See also ==
- List of Dutch Olympic cyclists
