= Thea van Rijnsoever =

Dutch cyclist

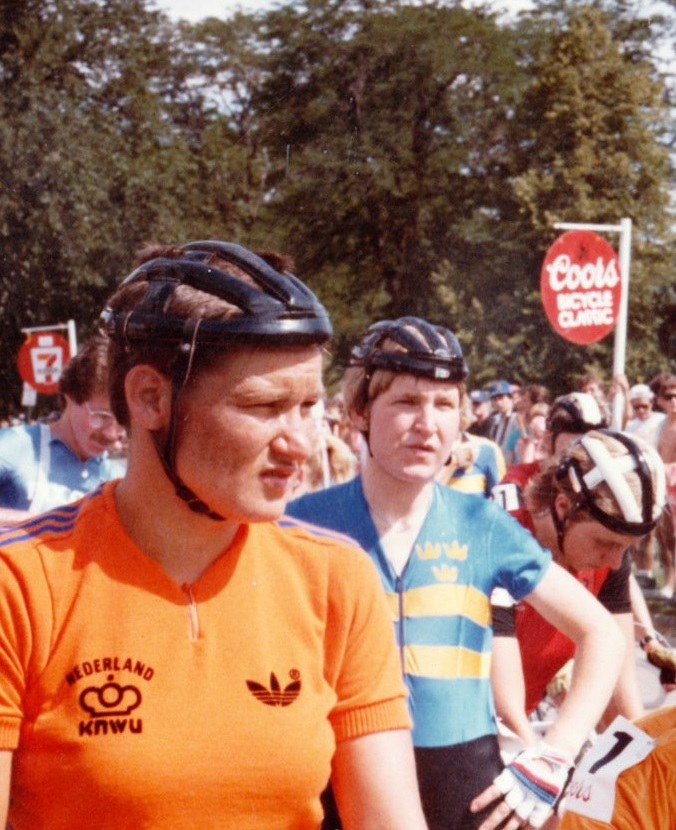

Personal information
- Full name: Theodora Maria van Rijnsoever
- Born: 27 November 1956 Ruwiel, Netherlands
- Height: 176 cm (5 ft 9 in)
- Weight: 68 kg (150 lb)

Cycling career
- Sport: Cycling

Theodora Maria "Thea" van Rijnsoever (born 27 November 1956 in Ruwiel) is a Dutch cyclist. She competed in the women's road race at the 1984 Summer Olympics, finishing 39th.

== See also ==
- List of Dutch Olympic cyclists
