= Linda van de Berg =

Dutch cyclist

Personal information
- Born: Netherlands

Cycling career
- Sport: Cycling
- Role: Rider (track)
- Rider type: Endurance

Professional team
- 1984: Batavus

Linda van de Berg is a former Dutch track racing cyclist. She became national track cycling champion in the individual pursuit in 1986.
