= Tineke Fopma =

Dutch cyclist (born 1953)

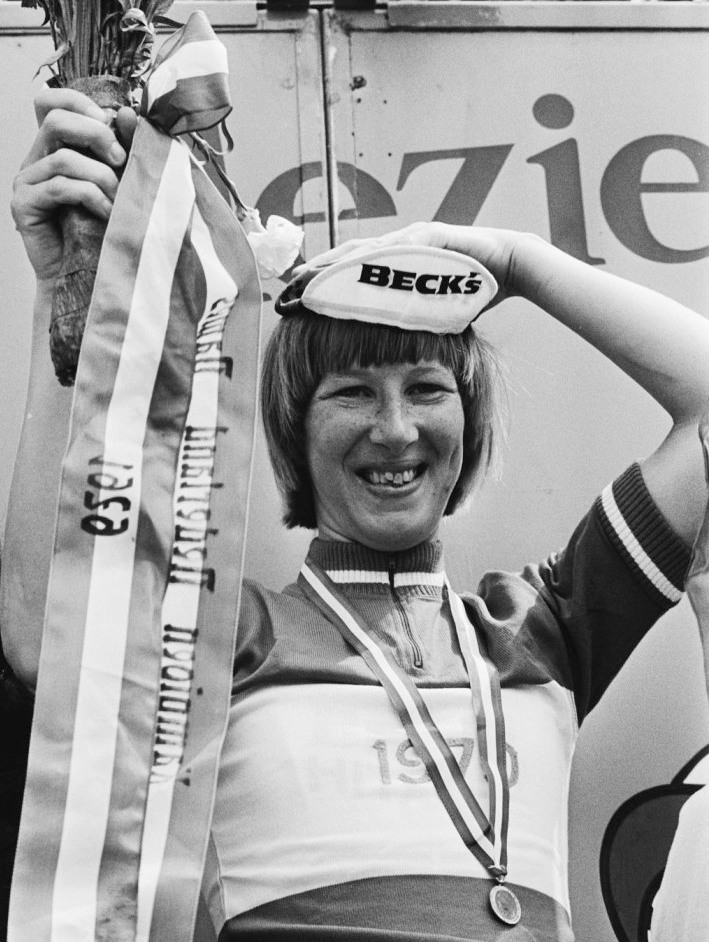
- Tineke Fopma in 1979

Personal information
- Born: 21 July 1953 (age 73) Húns, the Netherlands

Sport
- Sport: Cycling
Medal record
Representing the Netherlands
UCI Road World Championships
Gold medal – first place	1975 Mettet	Road race

Tineke "Trijntje" Fopma (born 21 July 1953) is a retired Dutch cyclist who was active between 1973 and 1981. She won the road race at the 1975 UCI Road World Championships.
