= Mariëlle van Scheppingen =

Dutch cyclist

Personal information
- Born: 2 May 1973 (age 53) Netherlands

Cycling career
- Sport: Cycling
- Discipline: Road cycling

Professional teams
- 2000-2001: Rabobank Women Cycling Team
- 2002: Ondernemers van Nature

Mariëlle van Scheppingen (born 2 May 1973) is a road cyclist from the Netherlands. She represented her nation at the 2000 UCI Road World Championships. She married the speed skater Gianni Romme in 2001.

== Major results ==
2000
10th UCI Road World Championships – Women's time trial
