= Mieke Havik =

Dutch cyclist

Personal information
- Born: 18 January 1957 (age 69) Heeze, Netherlands

Cycling career
- Sport: Cycling
- Discipline: Road cycling

Professional team
- 1981-1982: Shimano-Wolber

Mieke Havik (born 18 January 1957) is a road cyclist from the Netherlands. She participated at the 1987 UCI Road World Championships in the Women's team time trial.
