= Petra de Bruin =

Dutch cyclist

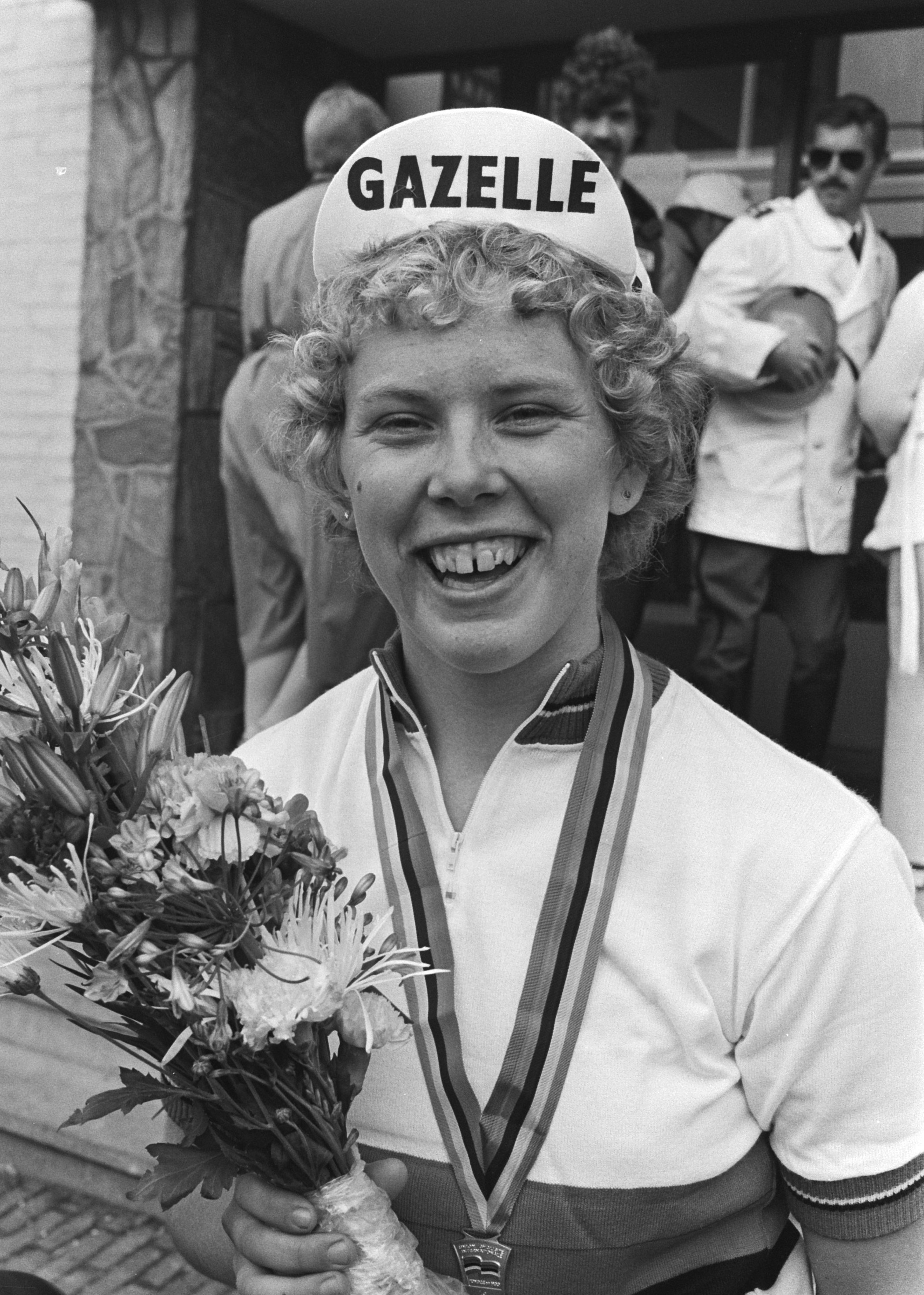
- Petra de Bruin in 1979

Personal information
- Born: 22 February 1962 (age 64) Nieuwkoop, the Netherlands

Sport
- Sport: Cycling
- Club: Dextro; Groen Transport
Medal record
Representing the Netherlands
World Championships
Gold medal – first place	1979 Valkenburg	Road race
Bronze medal – third place	1980 Besançon	3 km individual pursuit

Petra de Bruin (born 22 February 1962) is a Dutch former cyclist.

== UCI Track Cycling World Championships ==
In 1979 Petra de Bruin won the road race at the World Cycling Championships. She came third in 3 km pursuit at the UCI Track Cycling World Championships in 1980.

== Dutch Sportsman of the year ==
Petra de Bruin was selected as Dutch Sportsman of the year.

== After retirement ==
Petra de Bruin has spoken about the years of sexual abuse she endured as a young cyclist, stating that she had a lot of grief every day because of it

Awards
Preceded by Keetie van Oosten	Dutch Sportswoman of the Year; 1979	Succeeded by Annie Borckink
