= Keetie van Oosten-Hage =

Dutch cyclist (born 1949)

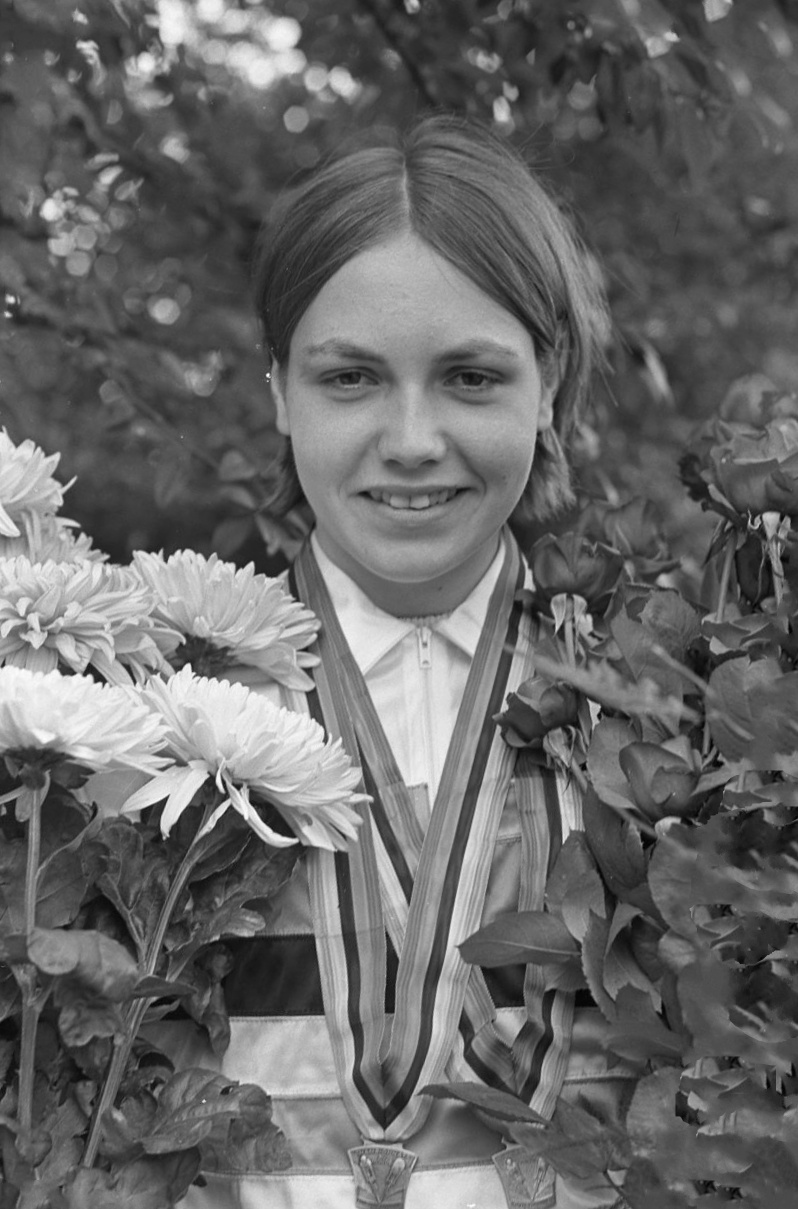
- Keetie van Oosten-Hage in 1968

Personal information
- Full name: Keetie van Oosten-Hage
- Born: 21 August 1949 (age 77) Sint-Maartensdijk, Netherlands

Cycling career
- Sport: Cycling
- Disciplines: Road & Track
- Role: Rider
- Rider type: Pursuit/Endurance

Professional team
- 1977: Beck's Bier

Major wins
- World Pursuit Champion (1975–1976 & 1978–1979); World Road Race Champion (1968 & 1976)
Medal record
Representing Netherlands
UCI Road World Championships
Silver medal – second place	1966 Nürburgring	Road race
Gold medal – first place	1968 Imola	Road race
Bronze medal – third place	1971 Mendrisio	Road race
Silver medal – second place	1973 Barcelona	Road race
Bronze medal – third place	1974 Montreal	Road race
Bronze medal – third place	1975 Yvoir	Road race
Gold medal – first place	1976 Ostuni	Road race
Silver medal – second place	1978 Nürburgring	Road race
UCI Track World Championships
Bronze medal – third place	1968 Rome	3 km pursuit
Bronze medal – third place	1969 Brno	3 km pursuit
Silver medal – second place	1971 Varese	3 km pursuit
Silver medal – second place	1972 Marseille	3 km pursuit
Silver medal – second place	1973 San Sebastian	3 km pursuit
Bronze medal – third place	1974 Montreal	3 km pursuit
Gold medal – first place	1975 Rocourt	3 km pursuit
Gold medal – first place	1976 Monteroni	3 km pursuit
Gold medal – first place	1978 Munich	3 km pursuit
Gold medal – first place	1979 Amsterdam	3 km pursuit

Cornelia (Keetie) Hage, known by her married name Keetie van Oosten-Hage, (born 21 August 1949) is a Dutch former cyclist from Sint-Maartensdijk, Zeeland. She came from a family of cyclists, sister of Bella Hage, Heleen Hage and Ciska Hage, and aunt to Jan van Velzen. She was the national pursuit champion 12 times consecutively and won the national road championship nine times, eight times consecutively. She was the World Road Cycling Champion twice, first in 1968 under her maiden name of Cornelia (Keetie/Katie) Hage, then again in 1976 in her married name (shown here). She is one of the great women competitors of all time in international cycling.

On 16 September 1978, Hage set a world hour record at Munich with 43.082 km. She improved the world 5 km, 10 km and 20 km records in the same ride. She was Dutch sportswoman of the year in 1976 and 1978 and the trophy awarded each year to the Netherlands' best woman cyclist is named after her. There were few international stage races for women in her period and no women's cycling in the Olympic Games.

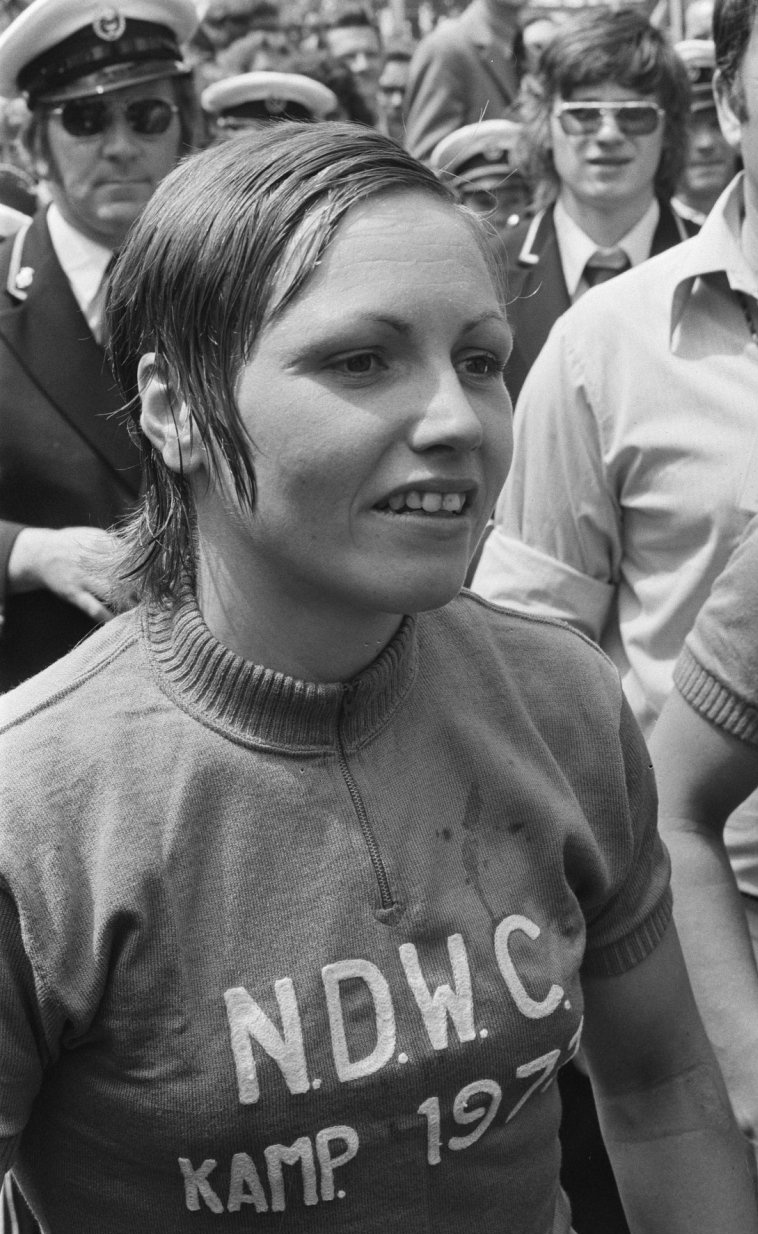
Keetie van Oosten-Hage in 1974

She retired, she said, because:

I had won all the races there were. They included six world championships and several Dutch championships and a big race in America. There comes a point when it makes your ambitions less. I was still winning, but I had done it all. But I would love to have ridden the Tour Féminin.

The Dutch cycling federation, the KNWU, gave her a job working with women coming up in her place. She became what the federation called its coordinator from 1985.

But it did not work. There was a coach and I was the coordinator for a couple of years from 1985 but it did not work. I would make all the arrangements but then the coach would be off after me to the KNWU and changed everything. And that made me so angry. I couldn't carry on like that, so I stopped.

She considered becoming the coach or taking some other defined job within cycling. But that would have involved taking a course and passing examinations, which did not appeal, and there were reports that the KNWU did not encourage her to do so.

She taught handicrafts part-time at a college near her home in Kloetinge outside Goes, in Zeeland, and rode a bike a lot less, saying in 1990 that she missed that but not racing. She gave away all the rainbow jerseys she won as world champion.

At the time they are nice to have, but then they are not so important and they mean more to other people, so I gave them away one by one. Now, of course, I regret it, but it is too late. I still have the medals, though.

She rode 40 to 60 road races a year:

Usually I won. A lot of people said at least now you have gone it will give other people a chance and we can use different tactics and so on. I can understand the other girls getting disillusioned because I usually won, and I suppose in retrospect that is not necessarily so good for the sport:

She never enjoyed meeting journalists. She said:

Journalists always ask difficult questions. It is quite a strain in a way, having your picture in the papers and things about you, and getting your picture on television. It was not so bad, but I never enjoyed it. Now there are girls here in Holland who go out of their way to seek publicity, and it is good because it draws attention to women's racing, but I could never go running after the reporters and so on.

== Notes and references ==
Awards
Preceded by Dianne de Leeuw	Dutch Sportswoman of the Year; 1976	Succeeded by Betty Stöve
Preceded by Betty Stöve	Dutch Sportswoman of the Year; 1978	Succeeded by Petra de Bruin
