= Rudie Kemna =

Dutch cyclist (born 1967)

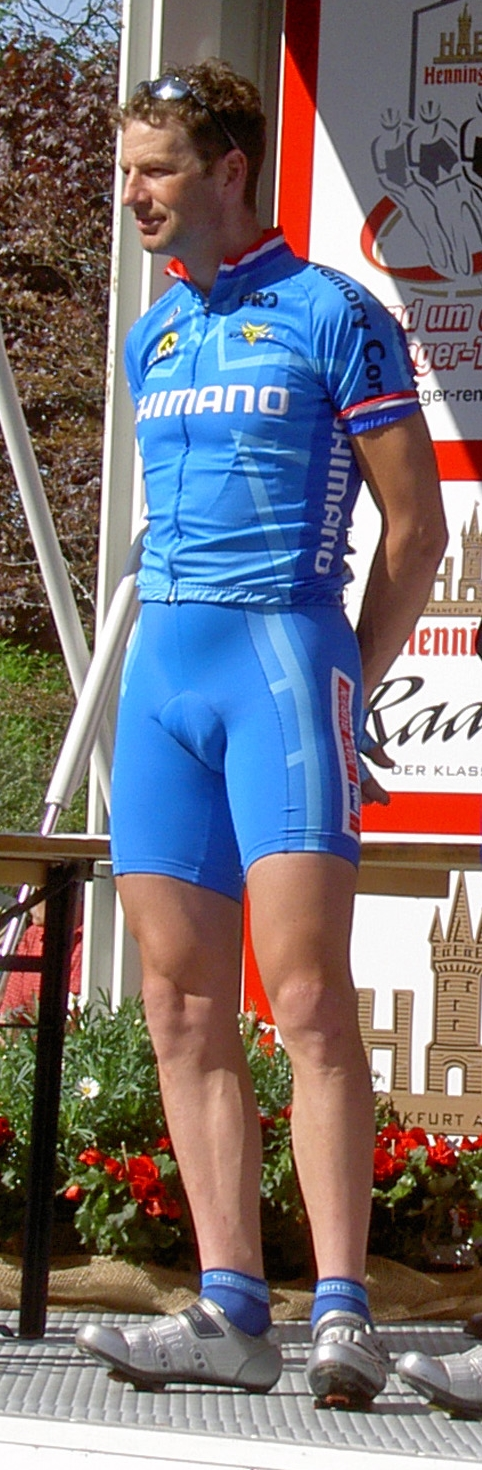
- Kemna in 2005

Personal information
- Born: 5 October 1967 (age 59) Oldenzaal, Netherlands

Cycling career
- Sport: Cycling
- Current team: Team Picnic–PostNL
- Discipline: Road
- Role: Rider; Directeur sportif
- Rider type: Sprinter

Amateur teams
- 1991: Team Telekom (stagiaire)
- 1998: Giant–Löwik

Professional teams
- 1999–2004: BankGiroLoterij–Batavus
- 2005: Shimano–Memory Corp

Managerial team
- 2006–: Skil–Shimano

Rudie Kemna (born 5 October 1967) is a Dutch former racing cyclist, who is currently a directeur sportif for Team Picnic–PostNL.

== Major results ==
1989
3rd Ronde van Midden-Nederland
1991
1st Stage 5 Teleflex Tour
1996
1st Ronde van Noord-Holland
1st Stage 3 Boland Bank Tour
2nd Ronde van Overijssel
1997
1st Ronde van Overijssel
1st Omloop der Kempen
1st Stages 2 & 7 Sachsen Tour
1st Stage 4 Teleflex Tour
1st GP Wieler Revue
1998
4th Ronde van Overijssel
1999
1st Stages 1 & 4 Ster ZLM Toer
1st Stage 3 Ronde van Nederland
1st Woudenomloop
2nd Dwars door Gendringen
2nd Grand Prix Rudy Dhaenens
3rd Ronde van Drenthe
6th Overall Olympia's Tour

1st Stages 1, 7, 8 & 9

9th GP Aarhus
2000
5th Kampioenschap van Vlaanderen
6th Overall Olympia's Tour

1st Stage 1

7th Ronde van Noord-Holland
2001
1st GP Herning
1st Ster van Zwolle
1st Stage 3 Course de la Solidarité Olympique
1st Stage 6 Ster Elektrotoer
2nd Road race, National Road Championships
2nd Arnhem–Veenendaal Classic
3rd Henk Vos Memorial
7th GP Rudy Dhaenens
8th Ronde van Noord-Holland
2002
1st Ronde van Noord-Holland
1st Ronde van Drenthe
1st GP Herning
1st Stage 2 Ster Elektrotoer
2nd Road race, National Road Championships
3rd Overall Tour of Qatar
4th Dwars door Gendringen
4th Trofeo Cala Millor-Cala Bona
5th Overall Circuit Franco-Belge
5th Tour Beneden-Maas
7th Nokere Koerse
9th Scheldeprijs
2003
1st Road race, National Road Championships
1st Ronde van Drenthe
4th Trofeo Manacor
5th Overall Tour of Rhodes

1st Stage 4

5th Trofeo Cala Millor-Cala Bona
8th Nokere Koerse
10th Brussels–Ingooigem
10th Ronde van Noord-Holland
2004
1st Noord-Nederland Tour (tied with 21 riders)
2nd Nokere Koerse
2nd Grand Prix Rudy Dhaenens
4th Road race, National Road Championships
9th Trofeo Alcudia
2005
3rd Nationale Sluitingsprijs
5th Road race, National Road Championships
6th Tour de Rijke
8th Ronde van Overijssel

Sporting positions
Preceded by Stefan van Dijk	Dutch National Road Race Champion; 2003	Succeeded by Erik Dekker
