= 2004 Paris–Brussels =

Race details
- Dates: 11 September 2004
- Stages: 1
- Distance: 226 km (140.4 mi)
- Winning time: 4h 59' 00"

Results
| | Winner | Nick Nuyens (BEL) | (Quick-Step–Davitamon) |
| | Second | Philippe Gilbert (BEL) | (FDJeux.com) |
| | Third | Allan Johansen (DEN) | (BankGiroLoterij) |

The 2004 Paris–Brussels was the 84th edition of the Paris–Brussels cycling race and was held on 11 September 2004. The race started in Soissons and finished in Anderlecht. The race was won by Nick Nuyens of the Quick-Step-Davitamon team.

== Race Report ==
In the first 2 hours of racing there were breakaway attempts by Juan Antonio Flecha, Michele Bartoli, Dmitry Fofonov, and Sylvain Chavanel before Benoît Poilvet and Rudie Kemna successfully got away. The duo stayed together out front, building a lead as large as 13 minutes, until 46km to go, when Kemna distanced Poilvet on the Mont St Roch climb. Meanwhile behind, on the same climb, Paolo Bettini, Tom Boonen, Gerben Löwik, and Nico Mattan broke away from the peloton. Those four riders ultimately waited for the peloton, while Kemna continued on in front. With 11km to go Bettini attacked again and quickly caught a cramping Kemna, while behind the peloton had reduced to 20 riders. Bettini allowed himself to be caught with 5km remaining, allowing his teammate Nick Nuyens to try a couple of attacks. First getting away with Christophe Mengin and Stefan van Dijk, before getting caught and going away on his with 1.5km to go. Philippe Gilbert and Allan Johansen attempted to follow, but Nuyens was able to stay away to the line.

== General classification ==
Final general classification

| Rank | Rider | Team | Time |
|---|---|---|---|
| 1 | Nick Nuyens (BEL) | Quick-Step–Davitamon | 4h 59' 00" |
| 2 | Philippe Gilbert (BEL) | FDJeux.com | + 1" |
| 3 | Allan Johansen (DEN) | BankGiroLoterij | + 2" |
| 4 | Jeremy Hunt (GBR) | Mr. Bookmaker–Palmans–Collstrop | + 4" |
| 5 | Paolo Bettini (ITA) | Quick-Step–Davitamon | + 10" |
| 6 | Marc Wauters (BEL) | Rabobank | s.t." |
| 7 | Rik Reinerink (NED) | Chocolade Jacques–Wincor Nixdorf | s.t." |
| 8 | Matthé Pronk (NED) | BankGiroLoterij | s.t." |
| 9 | Manuele Mori (ITA) | Saunier Duval–Prodir | s.t." |
| 10 | Nico Eeckhout (BEL) | Lotto–Domo | s.t." |
