= 2002 Scheldeprijs =

Race details
- Dates: 24 April 2002; 22 years ago
- Stages: 1
- Distance: 205 km (127.4 mi)
- Winning time: 4h 54' 00"

Results
	Winner	Robbie McEwen (AUS)	(Lotto–Adecco)
	Second	Tom Steels (BEL)	(Mapei–Quick-Step)
	Third	Stefan van Dijk (NED)	(Lotto–Adecco)

The 2002 Scheldeprijs was the 89th edition of the Scheldeprijs cycle race and was held on 24 April 2002. The race was won by Robbie McEwen of the Lotto team.

== General classification ==
Final general classification

Rank	Rider	Team	Time
1	Robbie McEwen (AUS)	Lotto–Adecco	4h 54' 00"
2	Tom Steels (BEL)	Mapei–Quick-Step	+ 0"
3	Stefan van Dijk (NED)	Lotto–Adecco	+ 0"
4	Michel Vanhaecke (BEL)	Landbouwkrediet–Colnago	+ 0"
5	Oleg Grishkin (RUS)	Navigators	+ 0"
6	Ján Svorada (CZE)	Lampre–Daikin	+ 0"
7	Mauro Zanetti (ITA)	Index–Alexia Alluminio	+ 0"
8	Ludovic Capelle (BEL)	AG2R Prévoyance	+ 0"
9	Rudie Kemna (NED)	Bankgiroloterij–Batavus	+ 0"
10	Nico Mattan (BEL)	Cofidis	+ 0"
