= Jans Koerts =

Dutch cyclist (born 1969)

Personal information
- Full name: Jans Koerts
- Born: 24 August 1969 (age 57) Eefde, the Netherlands
- Height: 1.85 m (6 ft 1 in)
- Weight: 78 kg (172 lb)

Cycling career
- Sport: Cycling
- Discipline: Road
- Role: Rider
- Rider type: Sprinter

Professional teams
- 1992: PDM–Ultima–Concorde
- 1993–1994: Festina–Lotus
- 1995–1996: Palmans–Ipso
- 1997–1998: Rabobank
- 1999: Team Cologne
- 2000: Farm Frites
- 2001: Mercury–Viatel
- 2002: Domo–Farm Frites
- 2003: BankGiroLoterij–Batavus
- 2004: Vlaanderen–T Interim
- 2005: Cofidis
- 2006–2007: Time-Van Hemert

Major wins
- Grand Tours Vuelta a España 1 individual stage (2000) Single-day races and Classics National Road Race Championships (2001)

Jans Koerts (born 24 August 1969) is a Dutch former professional road bicycle racer. He was professional from 1992 until 2007. He won Stage 3 of the 2000 Vuelta a España.

== Career ==
Koerts started his career at PDM–Concorde–Ultima in 1991. At the 2000 Vuelta a España, he won the Stage 3 mass sprint.

In 2005 during stage four of the Trofeo Joaquim Agostinho Koerts crashed heavily breaking both ankles, his ribs and fractured his femur. He did not race again until Ster van Zwolle in March 2007. Following his crash he left Cofidis.

== Doping ==
In 2007 Koerts admitted to doping over a span of eleven years. In 1993 while at Festina–Lotus, he started taking testosterone under guidance from the team doctor. In 1997 at Rabobank, he was encouraged to microdose on erythropoietin (EPO), but refused. However, in 1999, after being demoted to a lower level team he started to dope. He continued to dope occasionally until 2004.

== Post professional cycling ==
After retiring from professional cycling, Koerts started a coaching company which is still running as of 2024. He also works as a sales assistant at bike shop in Australia.

== Major results ==
1989
1st Omloop Houtse Linies
10th Overall ZLM Tour
1990
1st Overall, Sachsen Tour
5th Overall ZLM Tour

1st Stage 4

1991
1st Stage 1, OZ Wielerweekend
1st Ronde van Noord-Holland
1st Ster van Zwolle
1st Stages 4 & 5a, Circuit Franco-Belge
1992
1st Ronde van Limburg
3rd Overall Dwars door West-Vlaanderen
5th Tour de Midi-Pyrenees
1993
1st Stage 2 Route Adélie de Vitré
1st Stage 1 Volta a Portugal
4th GP Wielerrevue
5th Trofeo Luis Puig
1994
1st Grand Prix de Denain
1st Stage 1, Tour du Poitou-Charentes
1st Sprints classification Ronde van Nederland
3rd Tour of Leuven
3rd Clásica de Almería
6th Kuurne-Brussel-Kuurne
6th Classic Haribo
1995
1st GP Briek Schotte
1st GP Stad Sint-Niklaas
1st Dentergem
1st Buggenhout
1st Omloop van het Houtland
2nd Omloop van de Vlaamse Scheldeboorden
4th Memorial Rik Van Steenbergen
1996
1st Stages 2 & 3, Commonwealth Bank Classic
1st GP Rik Van Steenbergen
1st Stage 2, Teleflex Tour
1st Wielsbeke
1st Strombeek-Bever
1st Grote Prijs Jef Scherens
1st Stage 2 Vuelta a Burgos
1997
3rd Schaal Sels
5th Trofeo Luis Puig
7th Druivenkoers Overijse
1998
1st Affligem
1st Stages 1 & 6, Commonwealth Bank Classic
1st Ruddervoorde
1st Stage 5, Post Danmark Rundt
1st Sprints classification Ronde van Nederland
4th Flèche Hesbignonne
4th Omloop van de Vlaamse Scheldeboorden
6th Delta Profonde
7th Acht Van Chaam
1999
1st Stage 1, Commonwealth Bank Classic
1st Overall, OZ Wielerweekend

1st Stage 1,

1st Profronde van Surhuisterveen
1st Ronde van Noord-Holland
1st Stages 3 & 6, Rapport Toer
1st Stages 1 & 4, Giro del Capo
1st Stage 2, Ster der Beloften
1st Stages 1 & 2, Niedersachsen-Rundfahrt
1st Ronde van Drenthe
1st Izegem
1st Stage 3, Rheinland-Pfalz Rundfahrt
1st GP Wielerrevue
Commonwealth Bank Classic

1st Points classification
1st Stages 1 & 4

8th Ronde van Limburg
10th Omloop van het Houtland
2000
1st Stages 1 & 2, Commonwealth Bank Classic
1st Eindhoven
1st Omloop van het Waasland-Kemzeke
1st Stage 3a, Three Days of De Panne
1st Sparkassen Giro
1st Epe, Derny
1st Stage 3, Vuelta a España
2001
1st Road race, National Championships
1st Profronde van Zwolle
1st Stages 4 & 6, Tour de Langkawi
1st Stage 3, Paris–Nice
1st Stage 4, Tour de Picardie
1st Clarendon Cup
1st Profronde van Heerlen
2003
1st Stage 2, Tour of Belgium
1st Brussel–Ingooigem
1st Stage 4, Sachsen Tour
1st Stage 4, Post Danmark Rundt
1st Tour Beneden-Maas (Tour de Rijke)
1st Grand Prix d'Isbergues
1st Ronde van Noord-Holland
2004
1st Tour de Rijke
2021
2nd Just Ride Zwift Challenge

Sporting positions
Preceded by Léon van Bon	Dutch National Road Race; Champion; 2001	Succeeded by Stefan van Dijk
