= Haueisen =

Haueisen is a German surname. Notable people with the surname include:

- Lutz Haueisen (born 1956), German amateur cyclist
- Dennis Haueisen (born 1978), German professional cyclist, son of Lutz
- Michael Haueisen (born 1969), German born American businessman
