= Robbie McEwen =

Australian cyclist (born 1972)

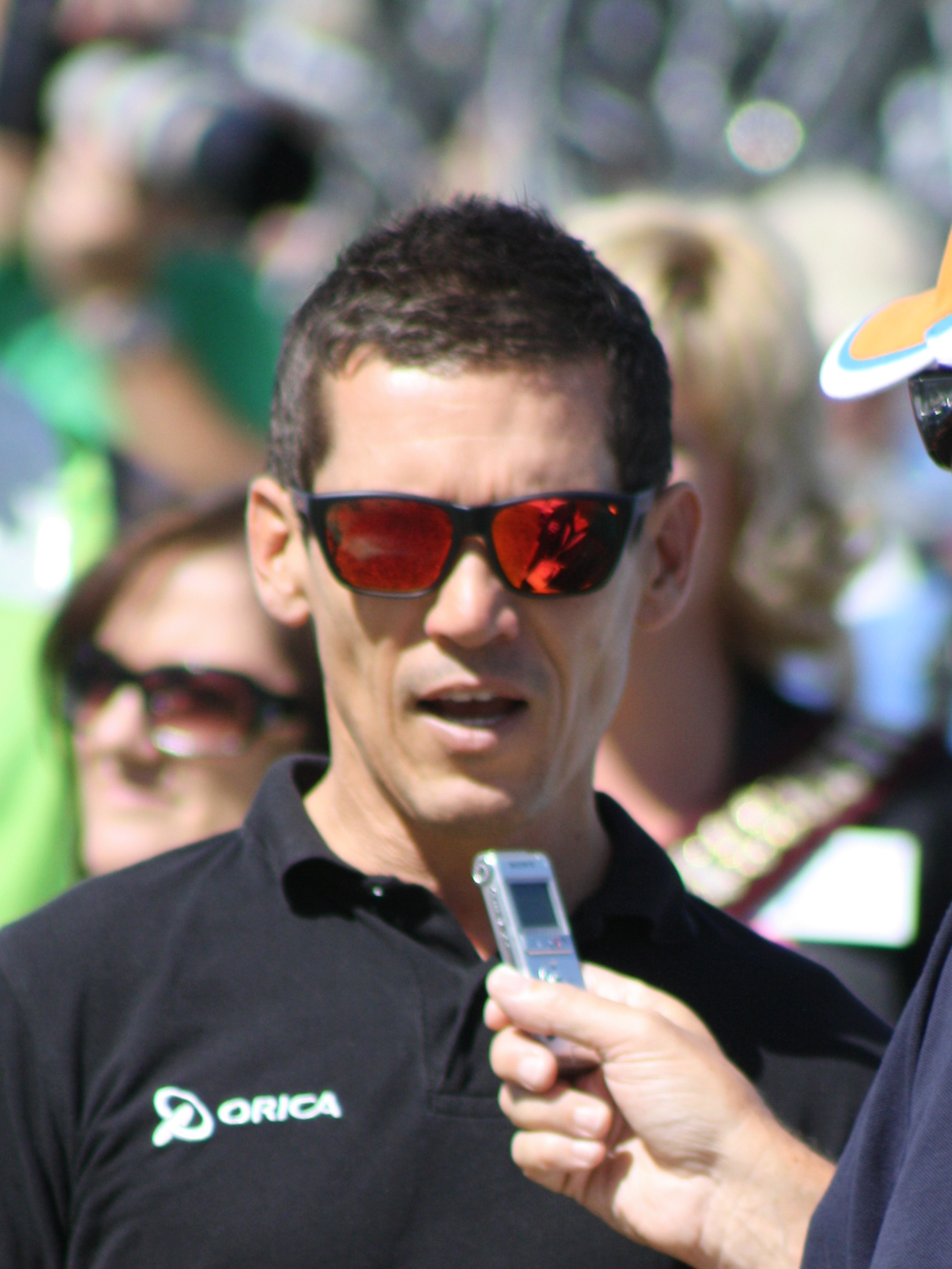
- McEwen at the 2013 Tour Down Under

Personal information
- Full name: Robert McEwen
- Nickname: Rocket Robbie
- Born: 24 June 1972 (age 54) Brisbane, Australia
- Height: 1.71 m (5 ft 7 1/2 in)
- Weight: 70 kg (154 lb; 11 st 0 lb)

Cycling career
- Sport: Cycling
- Discipline: Road
- Role: Rider
- Rider type: Sprinter

Professional teams
- 1996–1999: Rabobank
- 2000–2001: Domo–Farm Frites
- 2002–2008: Lotto–Adecco
- 2009–2010: Team Katusha
- 2011: Team RadioShack
- 2012: GreenEDGE

Managerial team
- 2012–2013: Orica–GreenEDGE

Major wins
- Grand Tours Tour de France Points classification (2002, 2004, 2006) 12 individual stages (1999, 2002, 2004, 2005, 2006, 2007) Giro d'Italia 12 individual stages (2002, 2003, 2004, 2005, 2006, 2007) One-day races and Classics National Road Race Championships (2002, 2005) Paris–Brussels (2002, 2005, 2006, 2007, 2008) Scheldeprijs (2002) Dwars door Vlaanderen (2003) Vattenfall Cyclassics (2008) GP de Fourmies (2005)
Medal record
Representing Australia
Men's road bicycle racing
World Championships
Silver medal – second place	2002 Zolder	Road race

Robbie McEwen AM (born 24 June 1972) is an Australian former professional road cyclist. He is a three-time winner of the Tour de France points classification in 2002, 2004 and 2006 and, at the peak of his career, was considered the world's fastest sprinter.

He last rode for Orica–GreenEDGE on the UCI World Tour.

A former Australian BMX champion, McEwen switched to road cycling in 1990 at 18 years of age. He raced as a professional from 1996 until 2012.

McEwen retired from the World Tour after riding the 2012 Tour of California and is now a cycling broadcast commentator on the Tour Down Under, the Tour de France, the Giro d'Italia and most of the major races for Warner Brothers Discovery networks like Eurosport, Discovery+ and Max Sports.

== Career ==
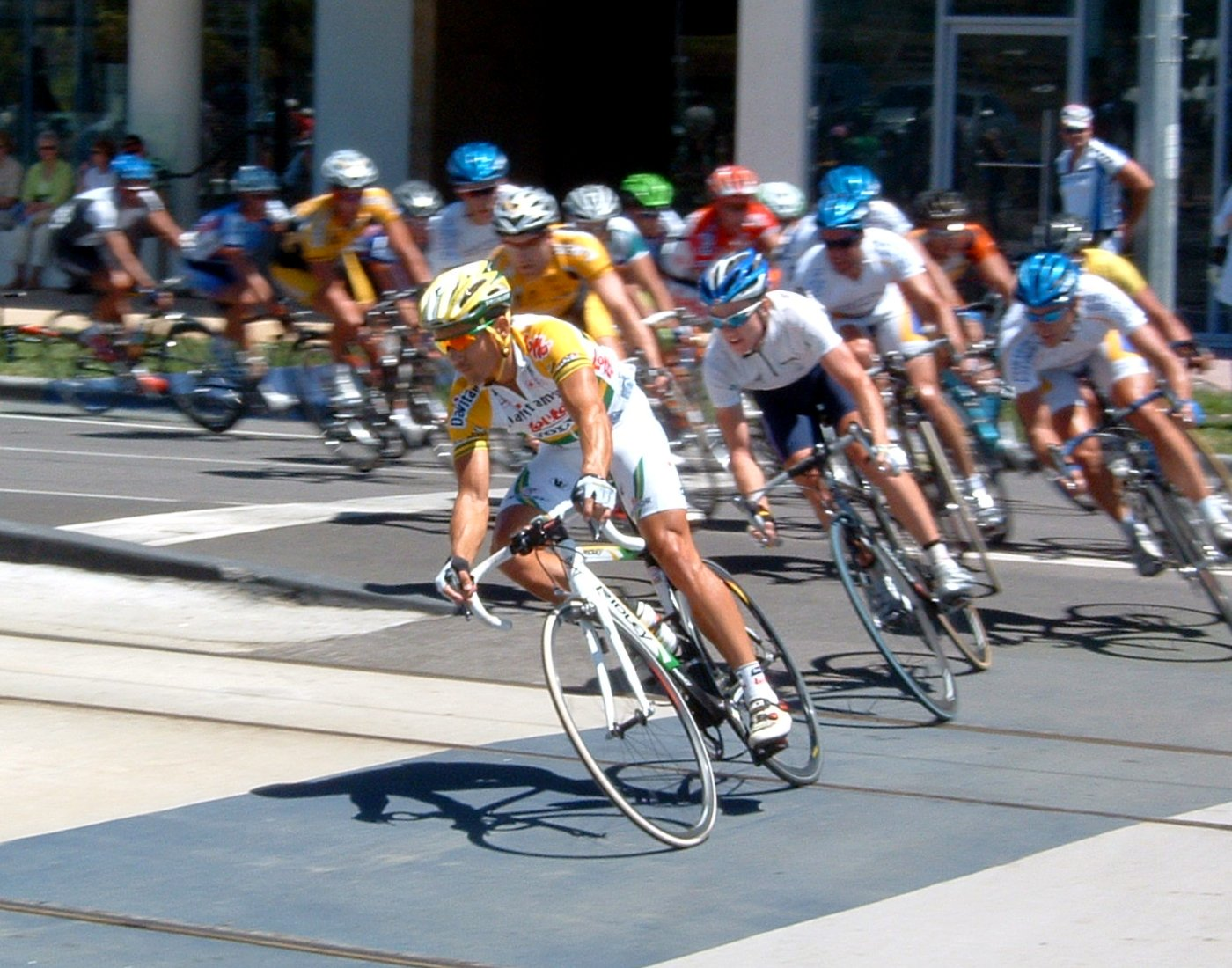
McEwen at the 2006 Bay Cycling Classic

McEwen was born in Brisbane. After four years of moving through the regional, state and national levels of cycling, he started at the Australian Institute of Sport in Canberra under road cycling coach Heiko Salzwedel. The first signs of his sprinting prowess on the international stage were at the Peace Race, winning three stages for the Australian national team.

McEwen competed in the road race at the 1996 Atlanta Olympic Games (23rd) and the 2000 Sydney Olympic Games (19th). He was also included on the Australian team for the 1994 UCI Road Cycling World Championship in Italy, and the 2002 UCI Road Cycling World Championship in Belgium, where he won a silver medal. McEwen was again selected for Australia at the 2004 Athens Olympic Games (11th) as part of the road race team.

McEwen was named 2002 Australian Cyclist of the Year, 2002 Male Road Cyclist of the Year and 1999 Male Road Cyclist of the Year. After spending 16 seasons racing for foreign teams (Dutch: Rabobank & Farm Frites; Belgian: Lotto; Russian: Katusha; USA: RadioShack), McEwen signed for the new Australian GreenEDGE team in September 2011 after it gained a ProTeam licence for the 2012 season.

=== Tour de France ===
McEwen participated in the Tour de France on 12 occasions: 1997 (117th), 1998 (89th), 1999, 2000, 2002, 2003, 2004, 2005, 2006, 2007, 2008 and 2010. Over the years, he has won 12 stages. In 1999, McEwen won the final stage sprint in Paris on the Champs-Élysées. In 2002, McEwen won stage 3 (Metz–Reims) and stage 20 (Melun–Paris). In 2004, McEwen won stages 3 and 9. In 2005, McEwen won stage 5 to Montargis, stage 7 to Karlsruhe in Germany, and stage 13 to Montpellier. In 2006, McEwen won stages 2, 4 and 6 to Esch-sur-Alzette, St Quentin and Vitré respectively.

He started the 2007 Tour with a victorious sprint on stage 1 to Canterbury. The stage win was seen as remarkable as he had crashed with 20 kilometres (12 mi) to go. He injured his knee and wrist but with the help of his team he clawed his way back to the bunch to win the sprint by over a bike length. The injuries he sustained from this crash did not prevent him from continuing but eventually he was forced out of the race when the Tour entered the Mountains, his knee injury became worse and he failed to finish stage eight within the time limit.

In 2002, McEwen became the first Australian to win the Tour de France points classification. By 2006, McEwen had won the Tour de France green points jersey three times in this race – in 2002, 2004 and, again, in 2006 – defeating rivals such as fellow Australians Baden Cooke and Stuart O'Grady, and international competitors like Erik Zabel of Germany, Tom Boonen of Belgium and Thor Hushovd of Norway.

McEwen's first win in the 2002 Tour de France saw him win the green jersey from German legend Erik Zabel, with O'Grady third and Cooke fourth. In 2004, McEwen won the points classification for a second time, defeating Hushovd and Erik Zabel. McEwen had fractured two transverse process (vertebrae) in a mass pile up on stage 6 and continued the race in extreme pain, making his stage 9 win in Guéret all the more remarkable.

McEwen won his third and final Points classification in the 2006 Tour de France, this time with Zabel second and Hushovd third.

In 2012, he announced that the Tour of California would be the last professional race of his career. He struggled to reach the finishing line of the mountain stages in the gruppetto. He humorously said after his arrival on the final stage in Los Angeles: "This was a good race to pick as my last because I suffered so much this week I won't miss it." He was awarded the "Most Courageous Rider" jersey at the end of the race to commemorate his last day of professional cycling. After retiring from racing, McEwen remained with Orica–GreenEDGE as a technical adviser and sprint coach.

=== Commentating ===
In 2017, 2018, 2019 and 2020, Robbie McEwen commentated on the Tour de France's world feed in English, alongside fellow Australian Matthew Keenan.

In 2021 he featured on SBS Australia's coverage of a number of cycling races, but his contract was not renewed for 2022.

He commentated on the Santos Festival of Cycling for the 7 Network Australia, and joined GCN (Global Cycling Network) in March 2022.

McEwen co-hosted the Seven Network broadcast of the 2023 & 2024 Santos Men's Tour Down Under used by Peacock in the US alongside Anna Meares and Phil Liggett. He then went on to feature on Eurosport's coverage of the 2024 Tour de France as both a pundit on The Breakaway and as a race commentator.

== Sprinting style ==
McEwen was known as a particularly cunning and tactical sprinter. Where many teams would use lead-out trains to secure a stage win for their selected sprinter, McEwen achieved many of his victories either with one lead-out man, or often none at all, by aggressively and intelligently positioning himself within the peloton in the final kilometres.

Fellow Australian cyclist Stuart O'Grady considers McEwen to be "one of the fastest, most powerful accelerators the planet has ever seen".

== Personal life ==
McEwen lives in Australia's Gold Coast with his Belgian wife, Angélique Pattyn, his son, Ewan, and his daughters, Elena and Claudia. In 2011, McEwen published an autobiography entitled 'One Way Road'. McEwen previously lived for many years in the Belgian town of Everbeek and is fluent in Dutch. He is a supporter of the Gold Coast Suns in the Australian Football League.

== Major results ==
1994
Peace Race

1st Stages 3, 6b & 9

1st Stage 1 Tour de l'Avenir
1995
Overall winner - Tour of Wellington
1st Stage 4 Regio-Tour
1st Stage 6 Tour de l'Avenir
1996
1st Luk-Cup Bühl
1st Stage 4 Vuelta a Murcia
1st Stage 2 Rheinland-Pfalz Rundfahrt
1st Stage 3b Regio-Tour
1st Stage 4 Tour de l'Avenir
4th Overall Herald Sun Tour

1st Stages 1b, 8b & 10b

1997
1st Overall Geelong Bay Classic Series

1st Stages 1, 2 & 4

Ronde van Nederland

1st Stages 2 & 3a

1st Stage 2 Four Days of Dunkirk
1st Stage 3 Tour de Luxembourg
4th Trofeo Alcúdia
5th GP Stad Zottegem
10th Overall Danmark Rundt
1998
1st Stage 1 Vuelta a Andalucía
1st Stage 5 Geelong Bay Classic Series
9th Overall Ronde van Nederland

1st Stages 3a & 5

1999
1st Overall Geelong Bay Classic Series

1st Stages 1, 4 & 5

Tour de France

1st Stage 20

1st Stage 2 Tour de Luxembourg
1st Stage 1a Route du Sud
Herald Sun Tour

1st Stages 3 & 6

2nd Trofeo Luis Puig
4th Dwars door Gendringen
9th Overall Ronde van Nederland

1st Stage 2

2000
1st Trofeo Alcúdia
1st Stage 6 Tour Down Under
2001
1st Trofeo Calvià
Herald Sun Tour

1st Stages 3 & 4 (ITT)

International Uniqa Classic

1st Points classification
1st Stages 2 & 3

1st Stage 2 Ronde van Nederland
1st Stage 2 Tour Méditerranéen
8th Overall Tour de Wallonie

1st Stage 4

8th Nokere Koerse
2002
1st Road race, National Road Championships
1st Overall Étoile de Bessèges

1st Stage 1

1st Overall Circuit Franco-Belge

1st Stages 2 & 3

1st Scheldeprijs
1st Paris–Brussels
1st Delta Profronde
1st RaboRonde Heerlen
Tour de France

1st Points classification
1st Stages 3 & 20

Giro d'Italia

1st Stages 4 & 10

Paris–Nice

1st Stages 2 & 7

Tour Down Under

1st Points classification
1st Stages 1, 3, 4 & 6

2nd Road race, UCI Road World Championships
2nd GP Rik Van Steenbergen
3rd Tour du Haut Var
3rd Veenendaal–Veenendaal
4th Omloop Het Volk
2003
1st Dwars door Vlaanderen
Giro d'Italia

1st Stages 4 & 11

1st Stage 2 Tour de Suisse
1st Stage 3 Tour Down Under
1st Stage 4 Étoile de Bessèges
3rd Veenendaal–Veenendaal
4th Grand Prix de Fourmies
6th Overall Circuit Franco-Belge

1st Stage 3

7th Delta Profronde
Tour de France

Held after Stages 1–5, 18 & 19

2004
1st Gouden Pijl
1st Memorial Samyn-Fayt-le-Franc
1st Profronde van Oostvoorne
Tour de France

1st Points classification
1st Stages 2 & 9
Held after Stage 3

Giro d'Italia

1st Stage 5
Held after Stage 5

Tour de Suisse

1st Stages 2 & 4

2nd Overall Tour Down Under

1st Points classification
1st Stages 1 & 4

2nd Overall Tour of Qatar
2nd Scheldeprijs
2nd Delta Profronde
2nd Veenendaal–Veenendaal
4th Overall Circuit de la Sarthe

1st Points classification

8th Sparkassen Giro Bochum
2005
1st Road race, National Road Championships
1st Overall Bay Classic

1st Stages 1 & 4

1st Paris–Brussels
1st Grand Prix de Fourmies
Tour de France

1st Stages 5, 7 & 13

Giro d'Italia

1st Stages 2, 6 & 10
Held after Stage 2
Held after Stages 2–3, 6 & 10–12

Tour Down Under

1st Points classification
1st Stages 1, 2 & 6

1st Stage 4 Tour de Suisse
1st Stage 5 Tour of Qatar
1st Stage 4 Niedersachsen Rundfahrt
3rd Grand Prix d'Isbergues
4th Paris–Tours
2006
1st Overall Grande Prémio Internacional Costa Azul

1st Points classification
1st Stage 1

1st Paris–Brussels
1st Down Under Classic
Tour de France

1st Points classification
1st Stages 2, 4 & 6

Giro d'Italia

1st Stages 2, 4 & 6
Held after Stages 4–12

1st Stage 1 Tour de Romandie
1st Stage 7 Herald Sun Tour
2nd Overall Driedaagse van West-Vlaanderen

1st Stage 2

2nd Memorial Rik Van Steenbergen
3rd Overall Tour Down Under
4th Grand Prix de Fourmies
5th Road race, UCI Road World Championships
2007
1st Paris–Brussels
Tour de France

1st Stage 1
Held after Stage 1

Giro d'Italia

1st Stage 2
Held after Stages 2 & 4

1st Stage 2 Tour de Romandie
1st Stage 1 Tirreno–Adriatico
1st Stage 5 Tour de Suisse
1st Stage 5 Tour Down Under
1st Stage 3 Jayco Bay Classic
1st Stage 3 Eneco Tour
2nd Scheldeprijs
3rd Schaal Sels
4th Milan–San Remo
6th Gent–Wevelgem
6th Paris–Tours
8th Overall Circuit Franco-Belge
9th Omloop Het Volk
2008
1st Vattenfall Cyclassics
1st Paris–Brussels
Tour de Suisse

1st Stages 3 & 4

1st Stage 2 Tour de Romandie
3rd Scheldeprijs
6th Paris–Tours
2009
1st Down Under Classic
1st Trofeo Cala Millor
1st Stage 3 Tour de Picardie
2010
1st Trofeo Palma de Mallorca
1st Stage 1 Eneco Tour
2nd Scheldeprijs
2nd Memorial Rik Van Steenbergen
4th Overall Tour Down Under
6th Grand Prix de Fourmies
7th Grote Prijs Jef Scherens
2011
1st Overall Tour de Wallonie-Picarde

1st Stages 1 & 4

1st Stage 4 Tour de Wallonie
2nd Tour de Mumbai
4th Kampioenschap van Vlaanderen
5th Scheldeprijs
8th Grand Prix de Fourmies

=== Grand Tour general classification results timeline ===
Grand Tour	1997	1998	1999	2000	2001	2002	2003	2004	2005	2006	2007	2008	2009	2010	2011
Giro d'Italia	—	—	—	DSQ	—	DNF	DNF	DNF	DNF	DNF	DNF	DNF	—	DNF	DNF
Tour de France	117	89	122	114	—	130	143	122	134	114	DNF	119	—	165	—
// Vuelta a España	—	DNF	DNF	—	139	—	—	—	—	DNF	—	—	—	—	—

Legend
—	Did not compete
DNF	Did not finish
DSQ	Disqualified

== Recognition ==
In 2015, he was an inaugural Cycling Australia Hall of Fame inductee. In 2019, inducted into Sport Australia Hall of Fame.
