= Tour de Rijke =

Race details
- Date: Mid September
- Region: Spijkenisse, Netherlands
- Local name(s): Tour de Rijke (in Dutch)
- Discipline: Road
- Competition: UCI Europe Tour
- Type: One-day race
- Web site: www.tourderijke.nl

History
- First edition: 1989
- Editions: 22 (as of 2011)
- First winner: Tim Steijger (NED)
- Most wins: Stefan van Dijk (NED); Jans Koerts (NED) (2 wins)
- Most recent: Theo Bos (NED)

Tour de Rijke is a single-day road bicycle race held annually in June in Spijkenisse, Netherlands. Since 2005, the race is organized as a 1.1 event on the UCI Europe Tour.

== Winners ==
| Year | Country | Rider | Team |
|---|---|---|---|
| 1989 | Netherlands | Tim Steijger | |
| 1990 | Netherlands | Rob Lenting | |
| 1991 | Netherlands | Eric Cent | |
| 1992 | Netherlands | Henny Beijer | |
| 1993 | Netherlands | Herman Woudenberg | |
| 1994 | Netherlands | Tommy Post | |
| 1995 | Netherlands | Perry Bothof | |
| 1996 | Netherlands | Emiel Van Dijk | |
| 1997 | Netherlands | Stefan Van Dijk | |
| 1998 | Netherlands | Marcel Duijn | |
| 1999 | Netherlands | Daniel Van Elven | |
| 2000 | Netherlands | Fulco Van Gulik | Cyclingteam Tegeltoko |
| 2001 | South Africa | Robert Hunter | Lampre–Daikin |
| 2002 | Great Britain | Roger Hammond | Palmans-Collstrop |
| 2003 | Netherlands | Jans Koerts | BankGiroLoterij |
| 2004 | Netherlands | Jans Koerts | Chocolade Jacques-Wincor Nixdorf |
| 2005 | Netherlands | Stefan van Dijk | MrBookmaker.com-SportsTech |
| 2006 | Australia | Graeme Brown | Rabobank |
| 2007 | Belgium | Gert Steegmans | Quick-Step–Innergetic |
| 2008 | Netherlands | Steven De Jongh | Quick-Step |
| 2009 | Netherlands | Kenny van Hummel | Skil–Shimano |
| 2010 | No race | | |
| 2011 | Netherlands | Theo Bos | Rabobank |
