= ZLM Tour =

ZLM Tour has been the name of two men's cycling races:

- ZLM Tour (UCI ProSeries), a race first held in 1987, which adopted its current name in 2019
- ZLM Tour (UCI Under 23 Nations' Cup), a defunct race, that ran as the ZLM Tour for under-23 riders between 2000 and 2018
