= 2005 Paris–Brussels =

Race details
- Dates: 10 September 2005
- Stages: 1
- Distance: 219 km (136 mi)
- Winning time: 4h 52' 00"

Results
	Winner	Robbie McEwen (AUS)	(Davitamon–Lotto)
	Second	Stefan Van Dijk (NED)	(MrBookmaker.com–SportsTech)
	Third	Jean-Patrick Nazon (FRA)	(AG2R Prévoyance)

The 2005 Paris-Bruxelles was the 85th edition of the Paris–Brussels cycling race and was held on 10 September 2005. The race started in Soissons and finished in Anderlecht. The race was won by Robbie McEwen of the Davitamon-Lotto team.

== Results ==
Results

Rank	Rider	Team	Time
1	Robbie McEwen (AUS)	Davitamon–Lotto	4h 52' 00"
2	Stefan Van Dijk (NED)	MrBookmaker.com–SportsTech	s.t."
3	Jean-Patrick Nazon (FRA)	AG2R Prévoyance	s.t."
4	Nico Eeckhout (BEL)	Chocolade Jacques–T Interim	s.t."
5	Igor Astarloa (SPA)	Barloworld	s.t."
6	Jon Bru (SPA)	Kaiku	s.t."
7	Ruggero Marzoli (ITA)	Acqua & Sapone–Adria Mobil	s.t."
8	Igor Abakoumov (BEL)	Jartazi Granville Team	s.t."
9	Alain van Katwijk (NED)	Shimano–Memory Corp	s.t."
10	Sjef De Wilde (BEL)	Bodysol–Win for Life–Jong Vlaanderen	s.t."
