= 2021 Bingoal Pauwels Sauces WB season =

Bingoal Pauwels Sauces WB
- 2021 season
- UCI code: BWB
- Status: UCI ProTeam
- World Tour Rank: 25th
- Manager: Christophe Brandt (BEL)
- Main sponsor(s): Bingoal; Fédération Wallonie-Bruxelles; Pauwels Sauces
- Based: Belgium
- Bicycles: De Rosa
- Groupset: Shimano

Season victories
- One-day races: 1
- Stage race stages: 2
- Most wins: Five riders (1)
- Best ranked rider: Timothy Dupont (BEL) (138th)

The 2021 season for Bingoal Pauwels Sauces WB was the eleventh season in the team's existence and the fifth as a UCI ProTeam.

The team started the season under the name Bingoal WB, with the title sponsors being Bingoal, a Belgian sports betting website, and the Wallonia-Brussels government. On 25 March, it was announced that Belgian condiment brand Pauwels Sauces would be promoted to co-title sponsor, having increased their investment into the team. The team made their debut under their new name, Bingoal Pauwels Sauces WB, the following day at the E3 Saxo Bank Classic.

== Team roster ==
As of 15 December 2021.

Rider	Date of birth
Stanisław Aniołkowski (POL)	20 January 1997 (aged 23)
Jonas Castrique (BEL)	13 January 1997 (aged 23)
Sean De Bie (BEL)	3 October 1991 (aged 29)
Dorian De Maeght (Note: De Maeght and Desal joined as stagiaires on 1 August from CT Borgonjon–Dewasport and EFC–L&R–Vulsteke, respectively.) (BEL)	13 August 1997 (aged 23)
Cerial Desal (BEL)	20 October 1999 (aged 21)
Timothy Dupont (BEL)	1 November 1987 (aged 33)
Laurens Huys (BEL)	24 September 1998 (aged 22)
Arjen Livyns (BEL)	1 September 1994 (aged 26)
Milan Menten (BEL)	31 October 1996 (aged 24)
Rémy Mertz (BEL)	17 July 1995 (aged 25)
Kenny Molly (BEL)	24 December 1996 (aged 24)

Rider	Date of birth
Mathijs Paasschens (NED)	18 March 1996 (aged 24)
Tom Paquot (BEL)	22 September 1999 (aged 21)
Dimitri Peyskens (BEL)	26 November 1991 (aged 29)
Laurenz Rex (BEL)	15 December 1999 (aged 21)
Ludovic Robeet (BEL)	22 May 1994 (aged 26)
Joel Suter (SUI)	25 October 1998 (aged 22)
Boris Vallée (BEL)	3 June 1993 (aged 27)
Jelle Vanendert (BEL)	19 February 1985 (aged 35)
Quentin Venner (BEL)	15 June 1998 (aged 22)
Luc Wirtgen (LUX)	7 July 1998 (aged 22)
Tom Wirtgen (LUX)	4 March 1996 (aged 24)

Riders who joined the team for the 2021 season

Rider	2020 team
Stanisław Aniołkowski	CCC Development Team
Timothy Dupont	Circus–Wanty Gobert
Milan Menten	Sport Vlaanderen–Baloise
Rémy Mertz	Lotto–Soudal
Tom Paquot	Wallonie–Bruxelles Development Team
Laurenz Rex	Wallonie–Bruxelles Development Team
Quentin Venner	Wallonie–Bruxelles Development Team

Riders who left the team during or after the 2020 season

Rider	2021 team
Kevyn Ista	Retired
Eliot Lietaer	B&B Hotels p/b KTM
Julien Mortier	Dunkerque Grand Littoral–Cofidis
Aksel Nõmmela	
Baptiste Planckaert	Intermarché–Wanty–Gobert Matériaux
Franklin Six	Retired
Lionel Taminiaux	Alpecin–Fenix

== Season victories ==
Date	Race	Competition	Rider	Country	Location	Ref.
4 February	Étoile de Bessèges, Stage 2	UCI Europe Tour	Timothy Dupont (BEL)	France	La Calmette	
17 March	Nokere Koerse	UCI Europe Tour; UCI ProSeries	Ludovic Robeet (BEL)	Belgium	Nokere	
5 September	Benelux Tour, Combativity classification	UCI World Tour	Arjen Livyns (BEL)	Belgium		
18 September	Tour de Luxembourg, Mountains classification	UCI Europe Tour; UCI ProSeries	Kenny Molly (BEL)	Luxembourg		
30 September	CRO Race, Stage 3	UCI Europe Tour	Milan Menten (BEL)	Croatia	Makarska	
