= Lammertink =

Lammertink is a surname. Notable people with the surname include:

- Jos Lammertink (born 1958), Dutch cyclist
- Maurits Lammertink (born 1990), Dutch cyclist
- Steven Lammertink (born 1993), Dutch cyclist, brother of Maurits
