= Paul van Schalen =

Dutch cyclist

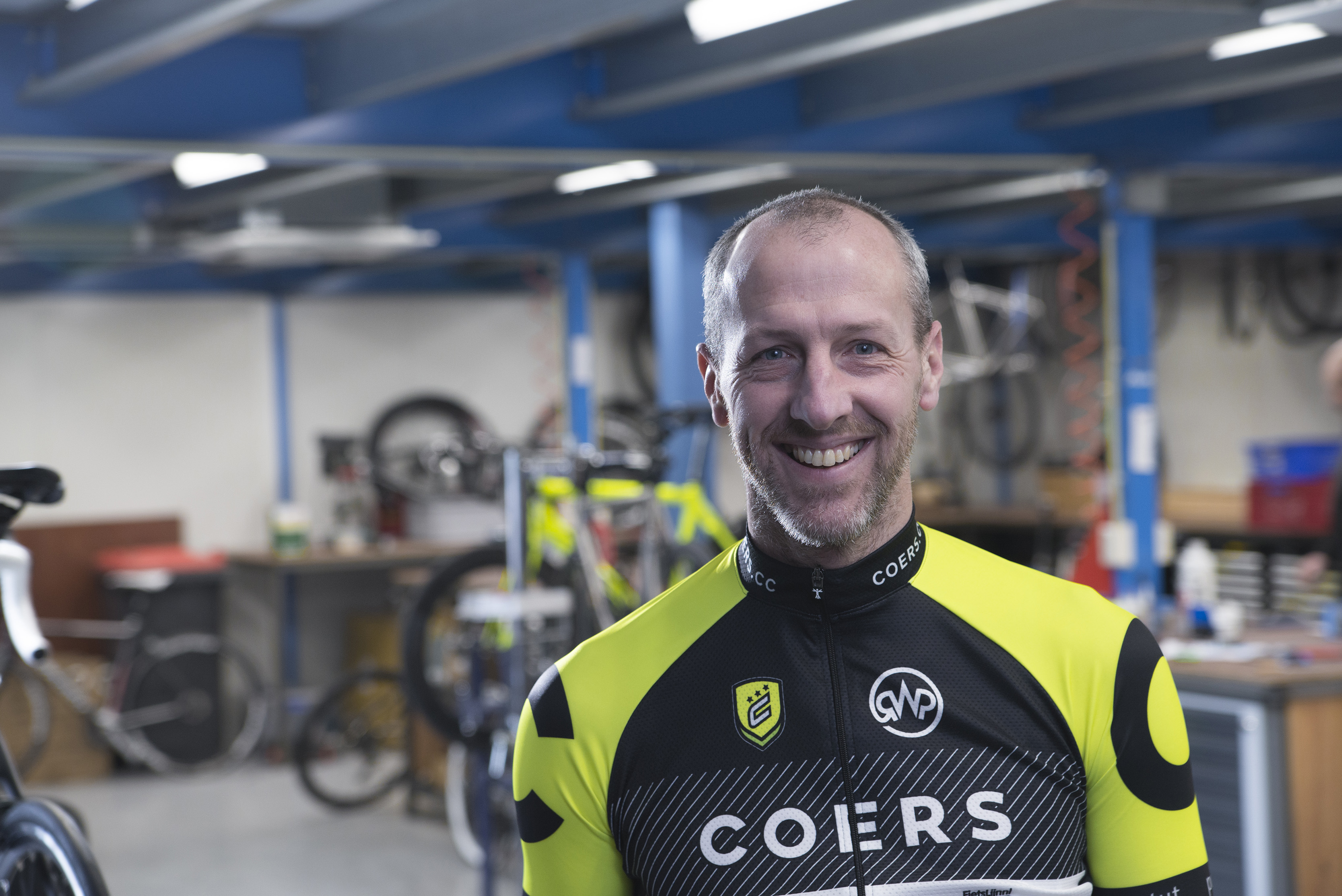

Personal information
- Born: 25 February 1972 (age 54) Heeze, Netherlands

Cycling career
- Sport: Cycling
- Current team: Retired
- Discipline: Road
- Role: Rider

Amateur team
- 1997–1998: Giant–Löwik

Professional teams
- 1999–2000: Batavus–BankGiroLoterij
- 2001: Team Cologne
- 2002–2007: Axa–VVZ Professional

Paul van Schalen (born 25 February 1972 in Heeze) is a Dutch former professional racing cyclist.

== Major results ==
1998
1st Stage 1 Thüringen Rundfahrt der U23
1st Prologue Olympia's Tour
1st Stage 4 Ster der Beloften
2nd Ronde van Drenthe
3rd Ster van Zwolle
2000
1st Ster van Zwolle
2002
3rd National Time Trial Championships
2005
1st Veenendaal–Veenendaal
1st Ronde van Noord-Holland
2007
1st Stage 9 Olympia's Tour
1st Stage 1 OZ Wielerweekend
