= ZLM Tour (UCI Under 23 Nations' Cup) =

Dutch road cycling race

ZLM Tour Grote Prijs Arjaan de Schipper
Race details
- Date: April
- Region: Goes, Zeeland
- Discipline: Road
- Web site: www.gparjaandeschipper.nl

History
- First edition: 1996
- Editions: 24
- Final edition: 2019
- First winner: Pascal Appeldoorn (NED)
- Most wins: Luke Rowe (GBR) (2 wins)
- Final winner: Jonas Castrique (BEL)

The ZLM Tour was a cycling race held annually between 1996 and 2019 in Goes and its surroundings, in the Dutch province of Zeeland. From 2008 to 2018, it was held as part of the UCI Under 23 Nations' Cup, and as such, was contested by national teams. In 2019, the race was known as the Grote Prijs Arjaan de Schipper, with the ZLM Tour nomenclature moving to the former Ster ZLM Toer.

== Winners ==
| Year | Country | Rider | Team |
|---|---|---|---|
| 1996 | Netherlands | Pascal Appeldoorn | |
| 1997 | Netherlands | Ronald van der Tang | |
| 1998 | Netherlands | Gerben Löwik | Giant–Löwik |
| 1999 | Netherlands | Mark ter Schure | Giant–Löwik |
| 2000 | Belgium | Wesley Van Speybroeck | Lotto–Adecco |
| 2001 | Estonia | Peep Mikli | |
| 2002 | Switzerland | Fabian Cancellara | Mapei–Quick-Step |
| 2003 | Netherlands | Angelo van Melis | Van Vliet–EBH Advocaten–Gazelle |
| 2004 | Netherlands | Kenny van Hummel | Van Hemert-Eurogifts |
| 2005 | Netherlands | Jos Pronk | Eurogifts.com |
| 2006 | Netherlands | Klaas van Hage | |
| 2007 | Netherlands | Ismaël Kip | KrolStonE Continental Team |
| 2008 | Italy | Jacopo Guarnieri | Italy (national team) |
| 2009 | Great Britain | Luke Rowe | Great Britain (national team) |
| 2010 | Kazakhstan | Arman Kamyshev | Kazakhstan (national team) |
| 2011 | Great Britain | Luke Rowe | Great Britain (national team) |
| 2012 | France | Maxime Daniel | France (national team) |
| 2013 | Netherlands | Yoeri Havik | Netherlands (national team) |
| 2014 | France | Thomas Boudat | France (national team) |
| 2015 | Denmark | Søren Kragh Andersen | Denmark (national team) |
| 2016 | Norway | Amund Grøndahl Jansen | Norway (national team) |
| 2017 | Great Britain | Chris Lawless | Great Britain (national team) |
| 2018 | Italy | Matteo Moschetti | Italy (national team) |
| 2019 | Belgium | Jonas Castrique | Wallonie–Bruxelles Development Team |
