= Asito-Craft Cycling Team =

Dutch cycling team

Team information
- UCI code: LMP (2003); LOW (2004–2007)
- Registered: Netherlands
- Founded: 1996
- Disbanded: 2009
- Discipline: Road
- Status: National (1996–2002); UCI Continental (2003–2007); National (2008–2009)

Team name history
- 1996–1999; 2000; 2001–2003; 2004; 2005; 2006–2007; 2008; 2009: Giant–Löwik; Cyclingteam Tegeltoko; Cyclingteam Löwik–Tegeltoko; Team Löwik Meubelen–Tegeltoko; Team Löwik Meubelen–Van Losser; Team Löwik Meubelen; Asito Cycling Team; Asito-Craft Cycling Team

Asito-Craft Cycling Team was a Dutch UCI Continental cycling team focusing on road bicycle racing. As a National level team they were invited to some UCI sanctioned events such as the Flèche du Sud in 2009.

== Final roster ==
As of 31 December 2009

Rider	Date of birth
Remco Broers (NED)	15 May 1988 (aged 21)
Sandro Harings (NED)	7 May 1990 (aged 19)
Sebastiaan Kamphuis (NED)	9 February 1987 (aged 22)
Maurits Lammertink (NED)	31 August 1990 (aged 19)
Dennis Luyt (NED)	12 February 1987 (aged 22)
Tim Nederlof (NED)	23 February 1987 (aged 22)
Sander Oostlander (NED)	25 November 1984 (aged 25)
Dirk Oude Ophuis (NED)	2 October 1985 (aged 24)
Niels Pieters (NED)	20 September 1985 (aged 24)
Peter Jan Polling (NED)	26 September 1990 (aged 19)

Rider	Date of birth
Marc Reef (NED)	22 March 1986 (aged 23)
Dirk Reuling (NED)	15 June 1984 (aged 25)
Geert van der Horst (NED)	28 March 1990 (aged 19)
Julian van Dijk (NED)	12 June 1989 (aged 20)
Steven van Leijen (NED)	31 March 1990 (aged 19)
Stefan van Winden (NED)	12 October 1989 (aged 20)
Martijn Verschoor (NED)	4 May 1985 (aged 24)
Bas Waaijer (NED)	6 September 1981 (aged 28)
Henk Wildeman (NED)	10 January 1990 (aged 19)

== Major wins ==
1996
Olympia's Tour

Stage 8a, Louis de Koning
Stage 10, Rik Reinerink

1997
Ronde van Noord-Holland, Bjorn Vonk
Stage 8a Olympia's Tour, Anthony Theus
1998
ZLM Tour, Gerben Löwik
Olympia's Tour

Prologue, Paul van Schalen
Stage 7, Anthony Theus

Ster van Zwolle, Renger Ypenburg
1999
ZLM Tour, Mark ter Schure
2000
Netherlands National Under-23 Road race, Bram Tankink
OZ Tour Beneden-Maas, Fulco van Gulik
2001
Netherlands National Under-23 Road race, Arno Wallaard
2002
Stage 4 Olympia's Tour, Maarten Lenferink
2004
Netherlands National Under-23 Time trial, Thom van Dulmen
Noord-Nederland Tour (Note: In view of the difficulties following the last 15 km of the race, the jury decided that the leading group of 22 should be placed equal and all of the individual classification prizes are shared equally between the 22 riders.)
2005
Ronde van Midden-Nederland, Wim Stroetinga
2006
Stage 2 Vuelta Ciclista a León, Bauke Mollema
2007
Overall GP Cycliste de Gemenc, Sander Oostlander

Stage 1, Sander Oostlander

2008
Ronde van Overijssel, Robin Chaigneau
Prologue Tour of Romania, Sander Oostlander
2009
Stage 3 Tour de Berlin, Dennis Luyt
Stage 7 Tour of Rwanda, Dirk Oude Ophuis

== World, Continental & National Champions ==
2000
National Under-23 Road race Championships, Bram Tankink
2001
National Under-23 Road race Championships, Arno Wallaard
2004
National Under-23 Time trial Championships, Thom van Dulmen
