= Julius van den Berg =

Dutch bicycle racer

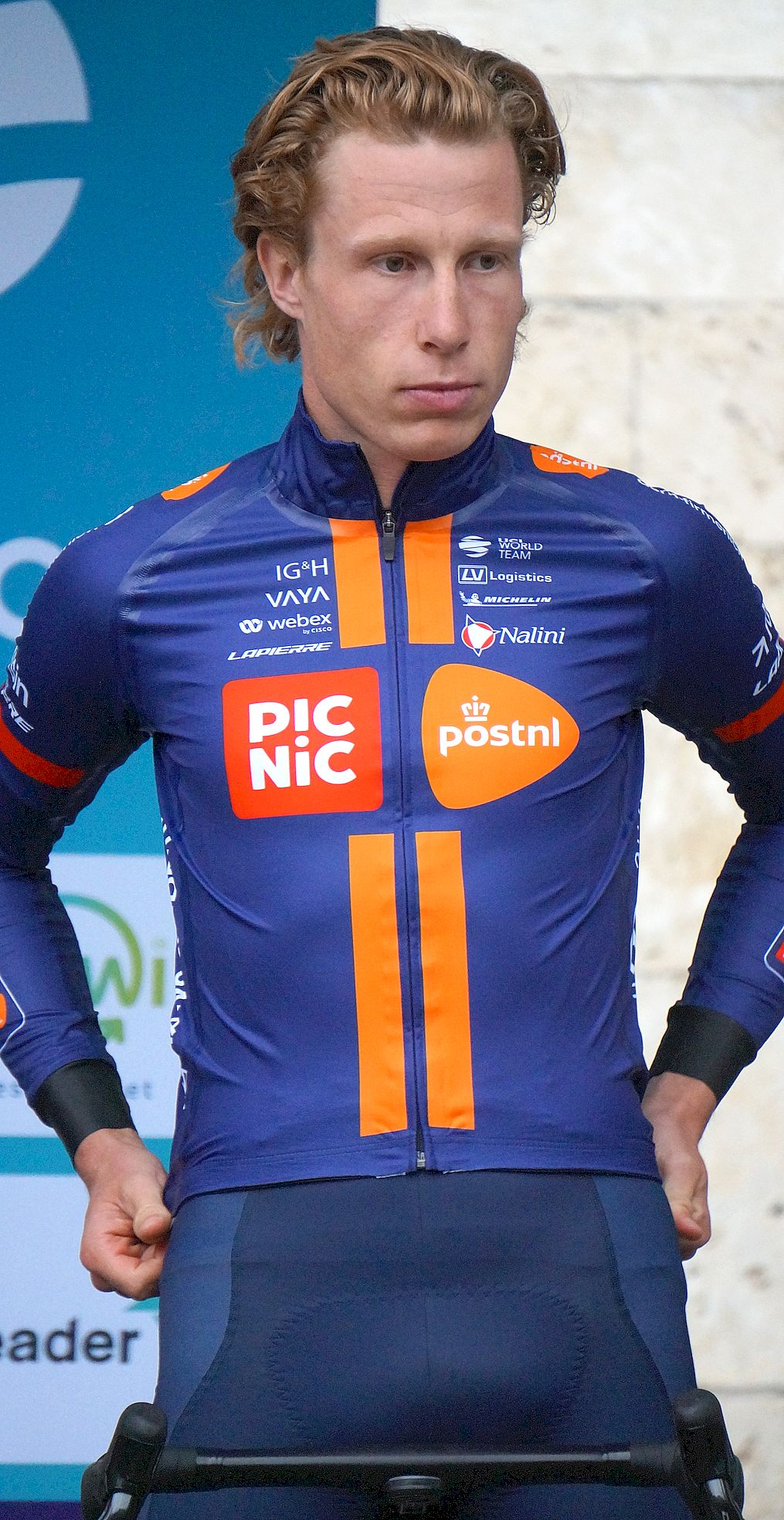
- Van den Berg in 2026.

Personal information
- Full name: Julius van den Berg
- Born: 23 October 1996 (age 29) Purmerend, Netherlands
- Height: 1.90 m (6 ft 3 in)
- Weight: 78 kg (172 lb)

Cycling career
- Sport: Cycling
- Current team: Team Picnic–PostNL
- Discipline: Road
- Role: Rider

Professional teams
- 2015–2018: SEG Racing
- 2018–2023: EF Education First–Drapac p/b Cannondale
- 2024–: Team dsm–firmenich PostNL

Julius van den Berg (born 23 October 1996 in Purmerend) is a Dutch professional road racing cyclist, who currently rides for UCI WorldTeam Team Picnic–PostNL.

In July 2018, van den Berg joined UCI WorldTeam EF Education First–Drapac p/b Cannondale, after spending three years with the SEG Racing Academy. In October 2020, he was named in the startlist for the 2020 Vuelta a España.

== Major results ==
2014
1st Overall Coupe du Président de la Ville de Grudziądz

1st Stage 3

1st Stage 2b Internationale Niedersachsen-Rundfahrt der Junioren
2nd Road race, National Junior Road Championships
2nd Overall Sint–Martinusprijs Kontich
3rd Trofeo Comune di Vertova
2016
5th Ronde van Noord-Holland
2017
1st Time trial, National Under-23 Road Championships
4th Overall Olympia's Tour
6th Ronde van Noord-Holland
10th Slag om Norg
2018
1st Road race, National Under-23 Road Championships
1st Ronde van Noord-Holland
1st Midden–Brabant Poort Omloop
2nd Paris–Roubaix Espoirs
4th Overall Tour de Normandie

1st Young rider classification
1st Stage 5

7th Overall Tour de Bretagne

1st Stage 6

2021
1st Stage 7 Tour de Pologne
5th Time trial, National Road Championships
2022
Vuelta a España

Held after Stages 2—3

=== Grand Tour general classification results timeline ===
Grand Tour	2020	2021	2022	2023	2024	2025	2026
Giro d'Italia	—	125	140	—	DNF	—	—
Tour de France	—	—	—	—	—	—	156
Vuelta a España	126	—	130	120	131	—	

Legend
—	Did not compete
DNF	Did not finish
