= Ab Sluis =

Dutch cyclist

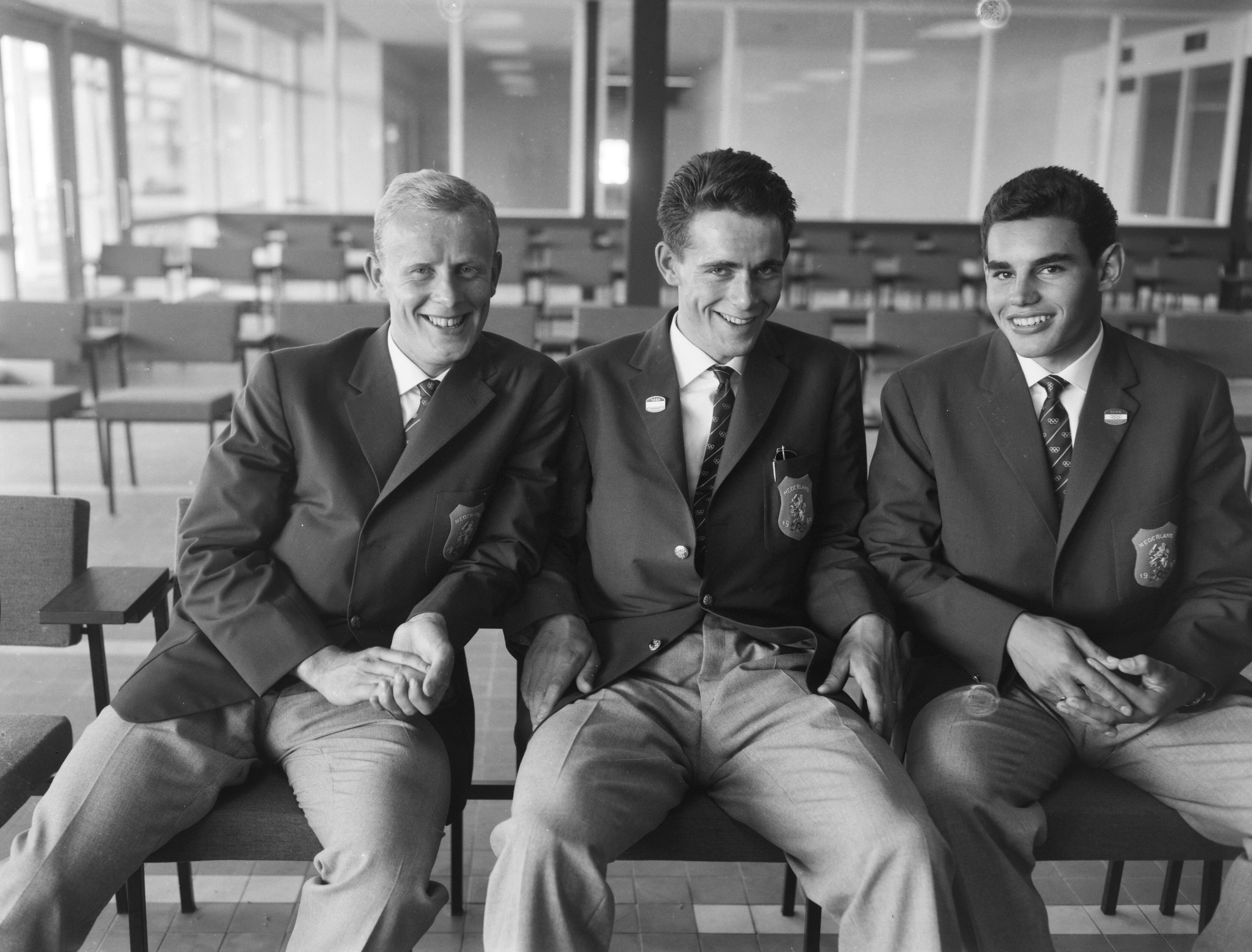
- René Lotz, Jan Hugens, Ab Sluis, 1960

Personal information
- Born: 26 November 1937 (age 88) Badhoevedorp, the Netherlands
- Height: 1.79 m (5 ft 10 in)
- Weight: 75 kg (165 lb)

Sport
- Sport: Cycling

Albert Herman "Ab" Sluis (born 26 November 1937) is a retired Dutch road cyclist. In 1960 he won the Ronde van Noord-Holland and finished in fourth place in the 100 km team time trial at the 1960 Summer Olympics.

== See also ==
- List of Dutch Olympic cyclists
