= Ronde van Noord-Holland =

Dutch road cycling race

Race details
- Date: Late April (until 2018); June (2019)
- Region: Noord-Holland, Netherlands
- English name: Tour of North Holland
- Local name(s): Ronde Van Noord-Holland (in Dutch)
- Discipline: Road
- Competition: UCI Europe Tour
- Type: Single-day (until 2018); Stage race (from 2019)
- Web site: www.rondevannoordholland.nl

History
- First edition: 1946
- Editions: 75 (as of 2021)
- First winner: Joop Middelink (NED)
- Most wins: Jans Koerts (NED) (3 wins)
- Most recent: Ivar Slik (NED)

Ronde van Noord-Holland is a road bicycle race held annually in the province of North Holland (Noord-Holland) in the Netherlands. In 2005 the race was organized as a 1.1 event on the UCI Europe Tour. From 2006 to 2018, it was rated as a 1.2 event.

== Winners ==
Year	Country	Rider	Team
1946	Netherlands	Joop Middelink	
1947	Netherlands	Gerard Van Beek	
1948	Netherlands	Johannes Krever	
1949	Netherlands	Piet Verwijmeren	
1950	Netherlands	Wout Wagtmans	
1951	Netherlands	Hans Dekkers	
1952	Netherlands	Piet Van Roon	
1953	Netherlands	Wout Verhoeven	
1954	Netherlands	Karel Keepers	
1955	Belgium	René Van Meenen	
1956	Netherlands	Jan Rol	
1957	Netherlands	Joop Van De Putten	
1958	Netherlands	Harry Scholten	
1959	Netherlands	Harry Scholten	
1960	Netherlands	Ab Sluis	
1961	Netherlands	Jan Janssens	
1962	Netherlands	Henk Cornelisse	
1963	Netherlands	Rinus Paul	
1964	Netherlands	Gerben Karstens	
1965	Netherlands	Evert Dolman	
1966	Netherlands	Eddy Beugels	
1967	Netherlands	Wim Dubois	
1968	Netherlands	Harrie Jansen	
1969	Netherlands	Harrie Jansen	
1970	Netherlands	Tino Tabak	
1971	Netherlands	Nanno Bakker	
1972	Netherlands	Wim De Waal	
1973	Netherlands	Piet van Katwijk	
1974	Netherlands	Theo Smit	
1975	Netherlands	Piet Van Der Kruijs	
1976	Netherlands	Adri van Houwelingen	
1977	Netherlands	Bart van Est	
1978	Netherlands	Henk Mutsaars	
1979	Netherlands	Theo de Rooij	
1980	Netherlands	Theo Hogervorst	
1981	Netherlands	Peer Maas	
1982	Netherlands	Theo Wallenburg	
1983	Netherlands	Erwin Kistemaker	
1984	Netherlands	Nico Van De Klundert	
1985	Netherlands	Geert Schipper	
1986	Netherlands	Ralph Moorman	
1987	Netherlands	Patrick Rasch	
1988	Netherlands	David Pots	
1989	Netherlands	Erik Stroombergen	
1990	Netherlands	Erwin Kistemaker	
1991	Netherlands	Jans Koerts	
1992	Netherlands	Henri Dorgelo	
1993	Netherlands	Patrick Rasch	
1994	Netherlands	Luc Reijrink	
1995	Netherlands	John den Braber	
1996	Netherlands	Rudie Kemna	
1997	Netherlands	Bjorn Vonk	
1998	Netherlands	Louis de Koning	
1999	Netherlands	Jans Koerts	Team Cologne
2000	Norway	Bjørnar Vestøl	Linda McCartney Foods
2001	Netherlands	Stefan van Dijk	BankGiroLoterij–Batavus
2002	Netherlands	Rudie Kemna	BankGiroLoterij–Batavus
2003	Netherlands	Jans Koerts	BankGiroLoterij–Batavus
2004	Netherlands	Stefan van Dijk	Lotto–Domo
2005	Netherlands	Paul van Schalen	Axa Pro Cycling Team
2006	Netherlands	Kai Reus	Rabobank Continental Team
2007	Netherlands	Kenny van Hummel	Skil–Shimano
2008	Germany	Robert Wagner	Skil–Shimano
2009	Netherlands	Theo Bos	Rabobank Continental Team
2010	Germany	Robert Wagner	Skil–Shimano
2011	Belgium	Niels Wytinck	Colba–Mercury
2012	Lithuania	Gediminas Bagdonas	An Post–Sean Kelly
2013	Netherlands	Dylan Groenewegen	Cycling Team De Rijke–Shanks
2014	No race		
2015	Netherlands	Johim Ariesen	Metec–TKH
2016	Denmark	Mathias Westergaard	Team Almeborg–Bornholm
2017	Netherlands	Fabio Jakobsen	SEG Racing Academy
2018	Netherlands	Julius van den Berg	SEG Racing Academy
2019	Netherlands	Ivar Slik	Monkey Town–à Bloc
2020	No race due to the COVID-19 pandemic in the Netherlands		
2021	No race due to insufficient police resources		
