= 2008 Vattenfall Cyclassics =

2008 UCI ProTour, race 14 of 15

Race details
- Dates: September 7, 2008
- Stages: 1
- Distance: 213.7 km (132.8 mi)
- Winning time: 4h 37' 46"

Results
	Winner	Robbie McEwen (AUS)	(Silence-Lotto)
	Second	Mark Renshaw (AUS)	(Crédit Agricole)
	Third	Allan Davis (AUS)	(Quick Step)

The 2008 Vattenfall Cyclassics road cycling race took place on September 7, 2008, in Hamburg, Germany and saw an all-Australian podium with Robbie McEwen of Silence–Lotto beating Mark Renshaw of Crédit Agricole and Allan Davis of Quick-Step.

== Results ==
	Cyclist	Team	Time
1	Robbie McEwen (AUS)	Silence–Lotto	4h 37' 46"
2	Mark Renshaw (AUS)	Crédit Agricole	s.t
3	Allan Davis (AUS)	Quick-Step	s.t
4	Murilo Fischer (BRA)	Liquigas	s.t
5	José Joaquín Rojas (ESP)	Caisse d'Epargne	s.t
6	Peter Wrolich (AUT)	Gerolsteiner	s.t
7	William Bonnet (FRA)	Crédit Agricole	s.t
8	Mirco Lorenzetto (ITA)	Lampre	s.t
9	Samuel Dumoulin (FRA)	Cofidis	s.t
10	Fabian Wegmann (GER)	Gerolsteiner	s.t

== See also ==
- 2008 in Road Cycling
