= SEG Racing Academy =

Dutch cycling team

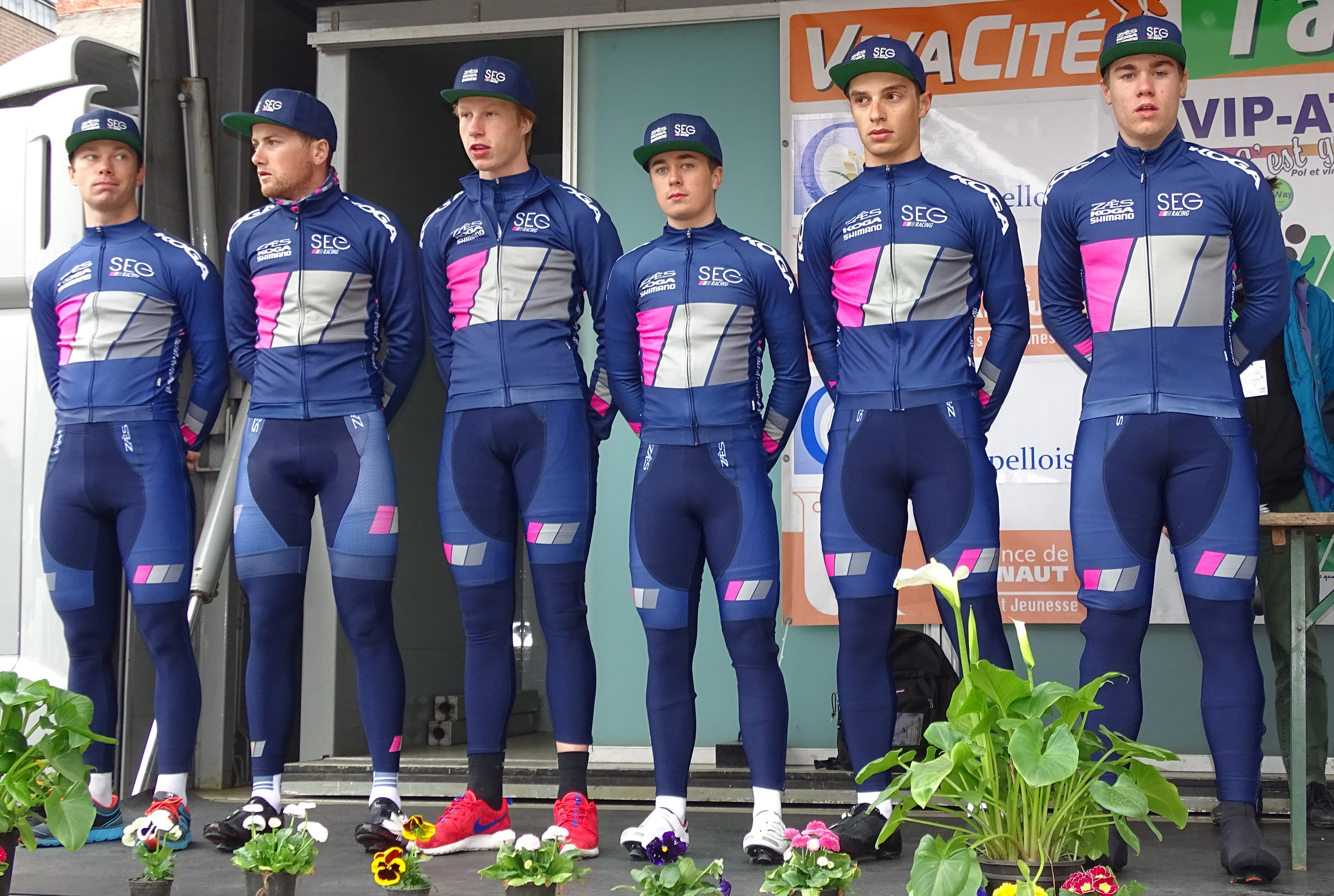

Team information
- UCI code: SEG
- Registered: Netherlands
- Founded: 2015; 11 years ago
- Discipline: Road
- Status: UCI Continental

Key personnel
- Team manager: Dries Hollanders

Team name history
- 2015 2016–: SEG Racing; SEG Racing Academy

SEG Racing Academy is a Dutch UCI Continental team founded in 2015 that participates in UCI Continental Circuits races.

== Team roster ==
As of 24 February 2021.

| Rider | Date of birth |
|---|---|
| Kyle Chromy (USA) | 22 March 2002 (age 24) |
| Tom Day (GBR) | 17 July 2002 (age 24) |
| Dries De Pooter (BEL) | 8 November 2002 (age 23) |
| Sean Flynn (GBR) | 2 March 2000 (age 26) |
| Marco Frigo (ITA) | 2 March 2000 (age 26) |
| Daan Hoole (NED) | 22 February 1999 (age 27) |
| Wessel Krul (NED) | 28 January 2000 (age 26) |

| Rider | Date of birth |
|---|---|
| Milan Paulus (BEL) | 23 October 2001 (age 24) |
| Jesper Rasch (NED) | 22 March 1998 (age 28) |
| Corbin Strong (NZL) | 30 April 2000 (age 26) |
| Stan Van Tricht (BEL) | 20 September 1999 (age 26) |
| Harrison Wood (GBR) | 14 June 2000 (age 26) |
| Maikel Zijlaard (NED) | 1 June 1999 (age 27) |

== Major wins ==
2015
Stage 3 Le Triptyque des Monts et Châteaux, Steven Lammertink
Arno Wallaard Memorial, Jasper Bovenhuis
Stage 4 Tour de Bretagne, Alex Peters
Overall Tour de Berlin, Steven Lammertink

Stage 2 (ITT), Steven Lammertink

Stage 5 Giro della Valle d'Aosta, Koen Bouwman
2016
Stage 7 Tour de Bretagne, Nick Schultz
Slag om Norg, Fabio Jakobsen
2018
Stage 5 Tour de Normandie, Julius van den Berg
Stage 5 Tour de Bretagne, Cees Bol
Stage 6 Tour de Bretagne, Julius van den Berg
Ronde van Noord-Holland, Julius van den Berg
Overall Ronde de l'Isard, Stephen Williams

Stages 1 & 2, Stephen Williams

Prologue Giro Ciclistico d'Italia, Edoardo Affini
Midden–Brabant Poort Omloop, Julius van den Berg
Stage 7 Giro Ciclistico d'Italia, Stephen Williams
Gooikse Pijl, Jordi Meeus
Paris–Tours Espoirs, Marten Kooistra
2019
Stage 2 Tour de Normandie, Alberto Dainese
Stage 5 Tour de Normandie, Barnabás Peák
Stages 1 & 3 Le Triptyque des Monts et Châteaux, Kaden Groves
Stages 1 & 4 Circuit des Ardennes, Kaden Groves
Stages 2, 3 & 6 Tour de Bretagne, Alberto Dainese
Entre Brenne et Montmorillonnais, Alberto Dainese
Stage 1 Ronde de l'Isard, Kaden Groves
Stage 1 Giro della Valle d'Aosta, Ide Schelling
Stage 3 Czech Cycling Tour, Alberto Dainese
2020
Ster van Zwolle, David Dekker
Dorpenomloop Rucphen, David Dekker
Stages 2 & 3 Czech Cycling Tour, Jordi Meeus
Stage 6 Giro Ciclistico d'Italia, Jordi Meeus
Stage 1 Ronde de l'Isard, Wessel Krul
2021
Young rider classification International Tour of Rhodes, Stan Van Tricht

== National champions ==
2015
Netherlands U23 Time Trial, Steven Lammertink

2016
Netherlands U23 Road Race, Fabio Jakobsen

2017
Netherlands U23 Time Trial, Julius van den Berg
Netherlands U23 Road Race, Fabio Jakobsen

2018
European U23 Time Trial, Edoardo Affini

2019
Netherlands U23 Time Trial, Daan Hoole

2020
Belgium U23 Road Race, Jordi Meeus
