= Kenny van Hummel =

Dutch road cyclist

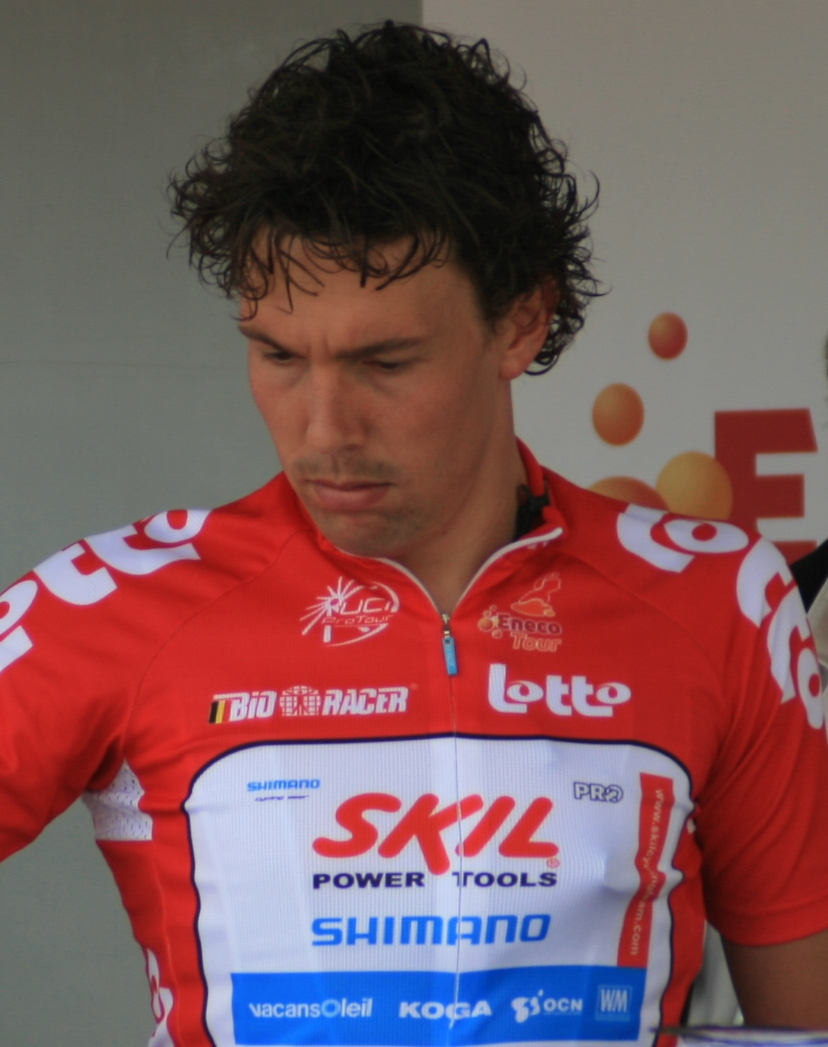
- Van Hummel at the 2008 Eneco Tour.

Personal information
- Full name: Kenny Robert van Hummel
- Nickname: Kamikaze Kenny
- Born: 30 September 1982 (age 44) Elden, the Netherlands
- Height: 1.76 m (5 ft 9 in)
- Weight: 64 kg (141 lb)

Cycling career
- Sport: Cycling
- Current team: Retired
- Discipline: Road
- Role: Rider
- Rider type: Sprinter

Amateur teams
- 2002–2003: Rabobank GS3
- 2004: Van Hemert-Eurogifts
- 2005: Eurogifts.com

Professional teams
- 2006–2011: Skil–Shimano
- 2012–2013: Vacansoleil–DCM
- 2014: Androni Giocattoli–Venezuela

Kenny Robert van Hummel (born 30 September 1982) is a retired road bicycle racer from the Netherlands, who specialised in sprint finishes. He competed professionally between 2006 and 2014, with the Skil–Shimano, Vacansoleil–DCM and Androni Giocattoli–Venezuela teams.

== Career ==
Born in Elden, Gelderland, van Hummel started cycling races at the age of seven, and one year later he became a member of cycling club "De Adelaar" in Apeldoorn. He had a successful youth career, and at 1998 joined the Rabobank youth team. He started road races and cyclo-cross races. In 2000, his second year as a junior, he came in fourth in the 2000 UCI Cyclo-cross World Championships for juniors.

In 2004, van Hummel changed teams to Van Hemert-Eurogifts. Van Hummel won a sprint in the ZLM Tour, and became second in the national championships for espoirs. One year later, Van Hummel won the Dutch road race championship for cyclists without professional contract, and won five criteriums.

In 2006, Van Hummel became a professional cyclist for Skil–Shimano. In that year he reached the podium in stages of the Tour of Belgium and the ENECO Tour, and won the Tour of North-Holland, which finished in a sprint.

2009 was a successful year for Van Hummel, especially the month of May. He won five races, the Profronde van Fryslan, Dutch Food Valley Classic, the Tour de Rijke and a stage in the Four Days of Dunkirk, and confirmed that he could win sprints as a professional. He became leader in the 2008–2009 UCI Europe Tour. At the Dutch National Road Race Championships, Van Hummel was competing for the win all day. Koos Moerenhout escaped close to the end, but Van Hummel finished second by winning the sprint.

Van Hummel was selected to join the 2009 Tour de France, after his team Skil–Shimano received a wildcard. Van Hummel was the first one to leave in time trial in the first stage, and finished the time trial in the second-worst time. After the sixth stage, Van Hummel was ranked last in the general classification. In the following mountain stages, Van Hummel could not keep up with the other cyclists, and finished among the last cyclists every day, sometimes riding tens of kilometers on his own, with a large margin to the other cyclists. His difficulties were increased by the fact that his team felt they could not afford to devote a domestique to assist Van Hummel (as is commonly done for other sprinters such as Mark Cavendish), as they could not afford to run the risk of having both riders disqualified. His daily struggle against the time limit, and his positive attitude made him a popular cyclist in the Netherlands. In the seventeenth stage, he fell and had to leave the race due to his sustained injuries.

After the mountain stages, the French newspaper L'Équipe named Van Hummel the "worst climber ever" in the Tour de France. The newspaper said that it never happened before that the same cyclist finished last in every mountain stage. What they did not say was that some other riders already left the tour because of the heavy mountain stages.

Van Hummel joined Vacansoleil–DCM for the 2012 season, having signed a two-year deal.

Van Hummel joined Androni Giocattoli–Venezuela for the 2014 season, after his previous team – Vacansoleil–DCM – folded at the end of the 2013 season.

== Personal life ==
Van Hummel used to live in Driel, before moving to Elden.

== Major results ==
2000
2nd Time trial, National Junior Road Championships
2001
9th Paris–Roubaix Espoirs
2002
2nd Ronde van Overijssel
2003
4th ZLM Tour
2004
1st ZLM Tour
2nd Road race, National Under-23 Road Championships
8th Rund um die Nürnberger Altstadt
2005
3rd Grote Prijs Stad Zottegem
4th Noord-Nederland Tour
5th Beverbeek Classic
7th Omloop van het Houtland
9th Overall Olympia's Tour
10th Omloop der Kempen
10th Rund um die Nürnberger Altstadt
2006
3rd Madison, National Track Championships (with Aart Vierhouten)
5th International Grand Prix Doha
8th Dutch Food Valley Classic
8th Noord-Nederland Tour
8th Ronde van Midden-Zeeland
9th Kampioenschap van Vlaanderen
2007
1st Ronde van Noord-Holland
2nd Grote Prijs Gerrie Knetemann
5th Schaal Sels
6th Kuurne–Brussels–Kuurne
2008
4th Dutch Food Valley Classic
10th Paris–Brussels
2009
1st Ronde van Overijssel
1st Batavus Pro Race
1st Dutch Food Valley Classic
1st Tour de Rijke
1st Peperbus Profspektakel
1st Stage 1 Four Days of Dunkirk
2nd Road race, National Road Championships
2nd Ronde van Drenthe
2nd Scheldeprijs
2nd Ronde van Noord-Holland
3rd Arno Wallaard Memorial
8th Münsterland Giro
2010
Tour of Hainan

1st Stages 4, 5, 7 & 9

1st Stage 1 Tour de Picardie
1st Stage 2 Tour of Belgium
2nd Arno Wallaard Memorial
2nd Dutch Food Valley Classic
2nd Omloop van het Houtland
4th Ronde van Overijssel
5th Ronde van het Groene Hart
8th Trofeo Cala Millor
8th Profronde van Fryslan
2011
1st Overall Ronde van Drenthe

1st Stages 1 & 2

1st Memorial Rik Van Steenbergen
Tour of Hainan

1st Points classification
1st Stages 6, 7 & 9

1st Stage 8 Tour of Turkey
2nd Handzame Classic
2nd Tour de Rijke
7th Nationale Sluitingsprijs
10th Scheldeprijs
2012
2nd Overall Tour de Picardie

1st Stage 2

2nd Memorial Rik Van Steenbergen
2nd Grand Prix d'Isbergues
3rd Kuurne–Brussels–Kuurne
5th Handzame Classic
5th Ronde van Zeeland Seaports
5th Halle–Ingooigem
6th Grand Prix de Denain
9th Paris–Brussels
2013
2nd Overall Arctic Race of Norway

1st Stage 1

2nd Handzame Classic
3rd Overall Tour de Picardie
3rd Ronde van Zeeland Seaports
3rd Dutch Food Valley Classic
5th Omloop van het Houtland
2014
1st Stage 6 Tour de Langkawi
1st Stage 1 Tour d'Azerbaïdjan
1st Stage 10 Vuelta a Venezuela
4th Grand Prix de Denain
4th Grote Prijs Jef Scherens
6th Kampioenschap van Vlaanderen
8th Volta Limburg Classic
9th Ronde van Zeeland Seaports

=== Grand Tour general classification results timeline ===
Grand Tour	2009	2010	2011	2012
Giro d'Italia	—	—	—	—
Tour de France	DNF	—	—	DNF
Vuelta a España	—	—	—	—

Legend
—	Did not compete
DNF	Did not finish
