= Manuele Mori =

Italian road bicycle racer

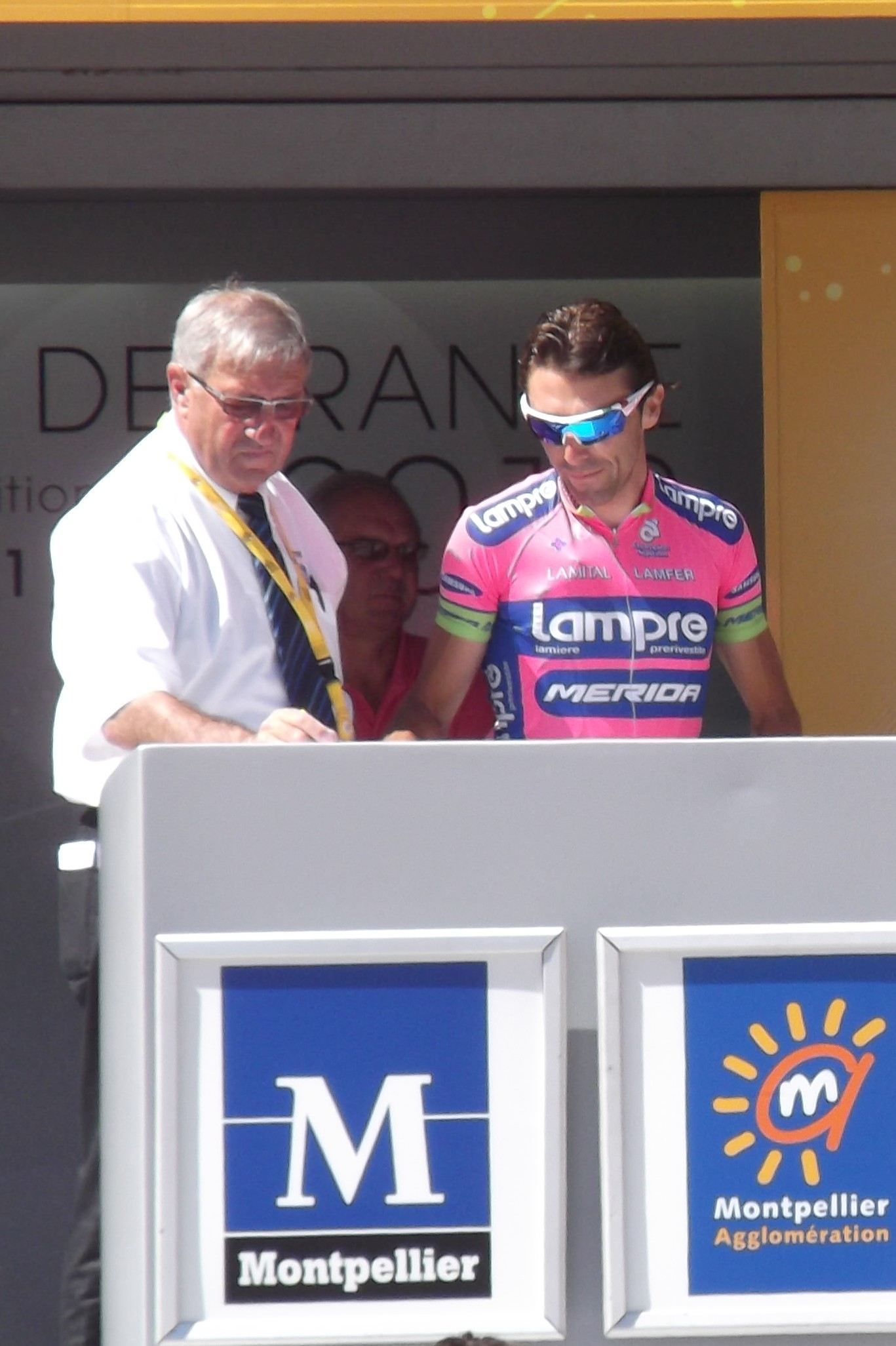

Personal information
- Full name: Manuele Mori
- Born: 8 September 1980 (age 46) Empoli, Italy
- Height: 1.72 m (5 ft 8 in)
- Weight: 62 kg (137 lb)

Cycling career
- Sport: Cycling
- Discipline: Road
- Role: Rider

Professional teams
- 2002: Perutnina Ptuj–KRKA–Telekom Slovenije
- 2004–2008: Saunier Duval–Prodir
- 2009–2019: Lampre–NGC

Manuele Mori (born 8 September 1980 in Empoli) is an Italian former professional road bicycle racer, who rode professionally between 2002 and 2019 for the Perutnina Ptuj–KRKA–Telekom Slovenije, Scott–American Beef and UAE Team Emirates teams. He won the Japan Cup in 2007.

== Major results ==
2001
3rd Gran Premio di Poggiana
2003
1st Gran Premio di Poggiana
1st Stage 1 Giro della Toscana Under-23
6th Gran Premio Industrie del Marmo
6th Ruota d'Oro
2004
9th Paris–Brussels
10th Gran Premio Bruno Beghelli
2005
3rd Memorial Cimurri
4th Road race, National Road Championships
5th Japan Cup
6th Coppa Sabatini
6th Giro del Piemonte
10th Milan–San Remo
2006
3rd GP Ouest–France
4th Giro del Piemonte
5th Gran Premio Bruno Beghelli
5th GP Miguel Induráin
6th Japan Cup
9th Coppa Placci
10th Vattenfall Cyclassics
2007
1st Japan Cup
3rd Memorial Cimurri
4th Monte Paschi Eroica
9th GP Ouest–France
10th Coppa Sabatini
2008
6th Trofeo Pollença
8th Gran Premio Bruno Beghelli
10th GP Ouest–France
2009
9th Rund um die Nürnberger Altstadt
10th Coppa Ugo Agostoni
2010
7th Giro della Toscana
9th Overall Tirreno–Adriatico
2011
6th Japan Cup
7th Gran Premio Nobili Rubinetterie
2013
2nd Gran Premio Bruno Beghelli
6th Japan Cup
2014
7th Overall Tour of Hainan
2016
4th Japan Cup
4th Memorial Marco Pantani
9th Overall Czech Cycling Tour

=== Grand Tour general classification results timeline ===
Grand Tour	2004	2005	2006	2007	2008	2009	2010	2011	2012	2013	2014	2015	2016	2017	2018
Giro d'Italia	76	85	88	DNF	—	93	—	—	—	—	118	80	63	—	66
Tour de France	—	—	—	—	—	—	—	—	—	76	—	—	—	DNF	—
Vuelta a España	—	—	—	—	—	—	90	107	—	70	—	—	—	—	—

Legend
—	Did not compete
DNF	Did not finish
