= Profronde van Fryslan =

Race details
- Date: Late June
- Region: Friesland, Netherlands
- English name: Tour of Friesland
- Local name(s): Profronde van Fryslan (in Dutch)
- Discipline: Road
- Competition: UCI Europe Tour
- Type: One-day race

History
- First edition: 2004
- Editions: 7 (as of 2010)
- Most recent: Markus Eichler (GER)

Profronde van Fryslan is a single-day road bicycle race held annually in June in Friesland, Netherlands. Since 2007, the race is organized as a 1.1 event on the UCI Europe Tour. Between 2004 and 2006 it was held as Noord-Nederland Tour, and in 2010 was known as the Batavus Pro Race.

== Winners ==
Year	Country	Rider	Team
2004		Multiple winners	
2005	Netherlands	Stefan van Dijk	MrBookmaker.com–SportsTech
2006	Netherlands	Aart Vierhouten	Skil–Shimano
2007	Netherlands	Maarten den Bakker	Skil–Shimano
2008	Belgium	Gert Steegmans	Quick Step
2009	Netherlands	Kenny van Hummel	Skil–Shimano
2010	Germany	Markus Eichler	Team Milram

In 2004, due to the difficulty of the final 15 kilometres (9.3 mi), the organisers decided to award the leading group of 22 riders with an equal classification. The group consisted of: Tom Veelers, Arne Kornegoor, Rudie Kemna, Matthé Pronk, Eelke van der Wal, Allan Bo Andresen, Thorwald Veneberg, Roy Sentjens, Bobbie Traksel, Erik Dekker, Paul van Schalen, Arno Wallaard, Bert Hiemstra, Igor Abakoumov, Gerben Löwik, Rik Reinerink, Stefan Kupfernagel, Marvin van der Pluym, Dennis Haueisen, Nico Mattan, Niels Scheuneman and Preben Van Hecke.
