= Sander Oostlander =

Dutch cyclist

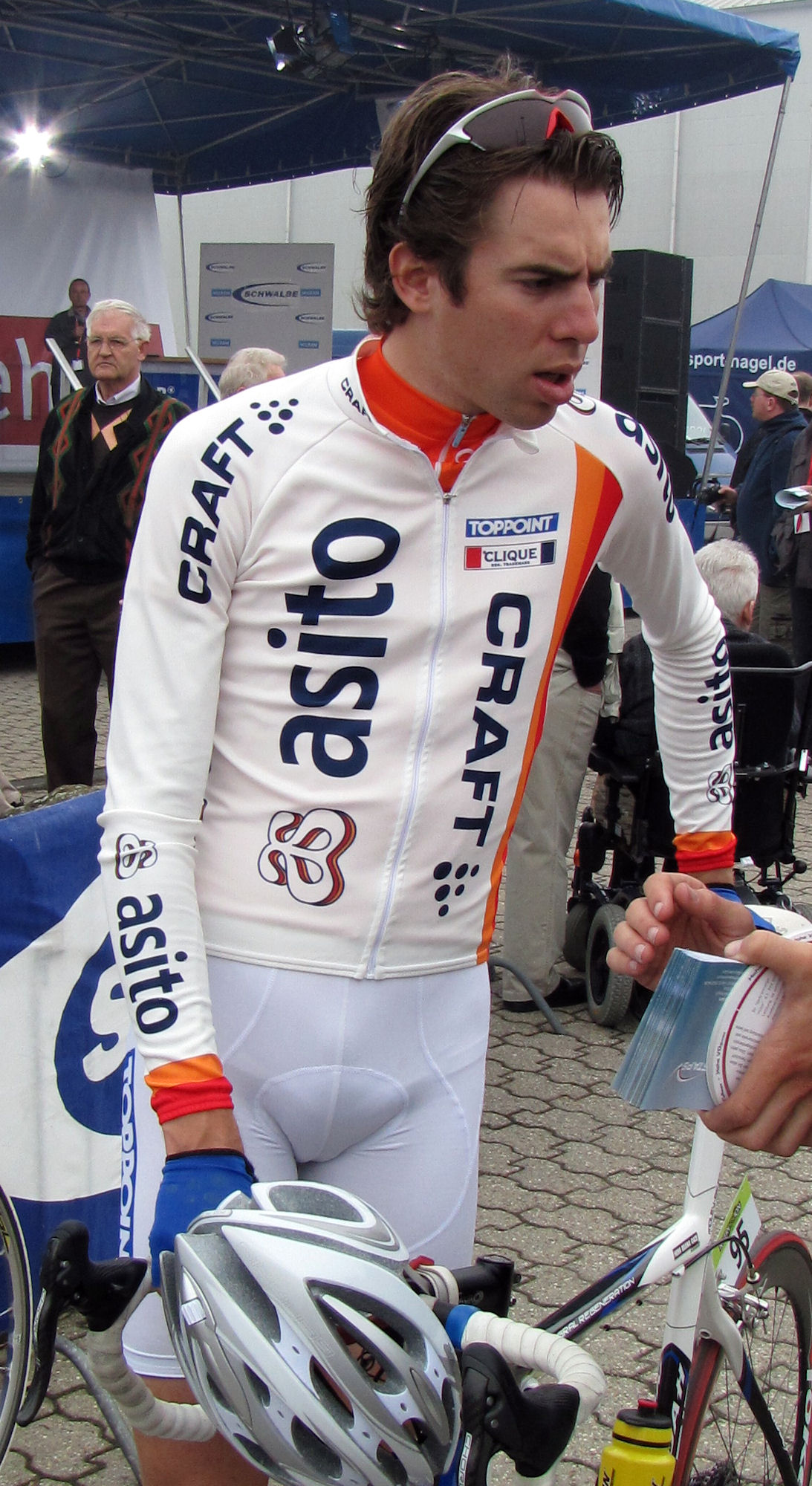

Personal information
- Full name: Sander Oostlander

Cycling career
- Sport: Cycling
- Current team: Retired
- Discipline: Road
- Role: Rider

Amateur team
- 2008–2009: Asito Cycling Team

Professional teams
- 2006–2007: Team Löwik Meubelen
- 2010–2011: Van Vliet–EBH Elshof
- 2011: Skil–Shimano (stagiaire)
- 2012: Cycling Team Jo Piels

Sander Oostlander (born 25 November 1984 in Heerjansdam) is a former Dutch cyclist.

== Major results ==
2007
1st Rund um den Elm
1st Overall Grand Prix Cycliste de Gemenc

1st Stage 1

2008
2nd Overall Tour of Romania

1st Prologue

3rd Kernen Omloop Echt-Susteren
