= Dennis Haueisen =

German cyclist (born 1978)

Denis Haueisen
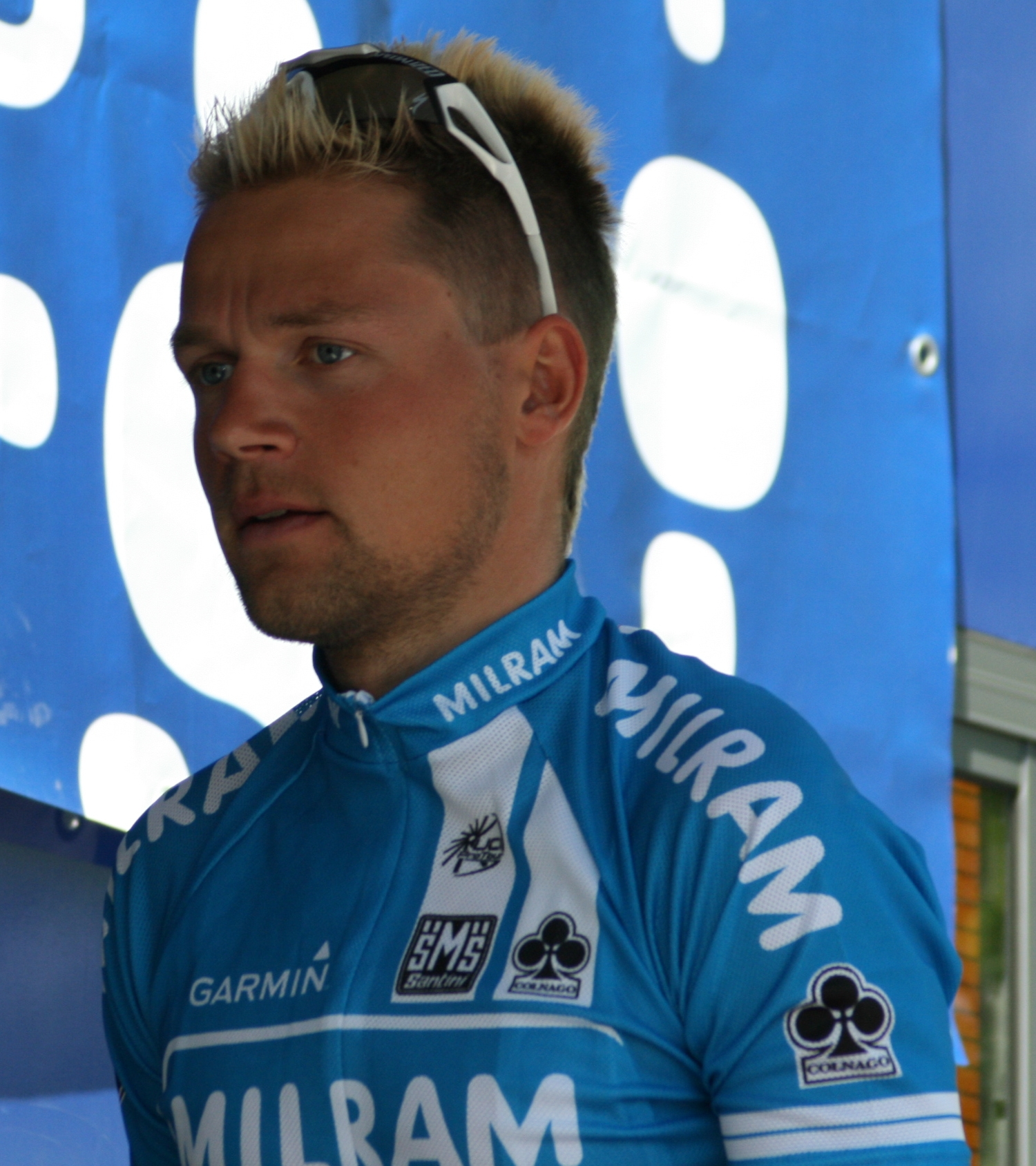

Personal information
- Full name: Dennis Haueisen
- Born: 13 September 1978 (age 48) Gera, East Germany

Cycling career
- Sport: Cycling
- Discipline: Road
- Role: Rider

Amateur teams
- 2001: Wiesenhof
- 2002: LTA-Quattro Logistics
- 2003: Rose Versand-Merlin Logistic
- 2004–2005: Radshop Haueisen-Thüringen

Professional team
- 2006–2008: Milram

Dennis Haueisen (born 13 September 1978 in Gera) is a retired German professional road bicycle racer who was active between 2001 and 2008. He is a son of Lutz Haueisen, amateur cyclist who won two world titles in track events.

== Palmares ==
- Profronde van Fryslan (2004)
- International Cycling Classic – 1 stage & Overall (2006)
