= 1998 Ronde van Nederland =

Dutch cycling race

These are the results for the 38th edition of the Ronde van Nederland cycling race, which was held from August 25 to August 29, 1998. The race started in Naaldwijk (South Holland) and finished in Landgraaf (Limburg).

== Stages ==
=== 25-08-1998: Naaldwijk-Hoorn, 178.1 km ===
RANK	NAME CYCLIST	TEAM	TIME
1.	Jeroen Blijlevens (NED)	TVM–Farm Frites	04:10:59
2.	Robbie McEwen (AUS)	Rabobank	—
3.	Giovanni Lombardi (ITA)	Team Telekom	—

=== 26-08-1998: Harlingen-Leeuwarden, 197 km ===
RANK	NAME CYCLIST	TEAM	TIME
1.	Jeroen Blijlevens (NED)	TVM–Farm Frites	04:53:59
2.	Giovanni Lombardi (ITA)	Team Telekom	—
3.	Serguei Outschakov (UKR)	TVM–Farm Frites	—

=== 27-08-1998: Leeuwarden-Groningen, 83 km ===
RANK	NAME CYCLIST	TEAM	TIME
1.	Robbie McEwen (AUS)	Rabobank	01:48:22
2.	Jeroen Blijlevens (NED)	TVM–Farm Frites	—
3.	Giovanni Lombardi (ITA)	Team Telekom	—

=== 27-08-1998: Groningen-Groningen (Time Trial), 25.7 km ===
RANK	NAME CYCLIST	TEAM	TIME
1.	Serhiy Honchar (UKR)	Cantina Tollo–Alexia Alluminio	00:32:07
2.	Peter Meinert Nielsen (DEN)	U.S. Postal Service	+ 0.02
3.	Viatcheslav Ekimov (RUS)	U.S. Postal Service	+ 0.12

=== 28-08-1998: Zwolle-Venray, 179.2 km ===
RANK	NAME CYCLIST	TEAM	TIME
1.	Robbie McEwen (AUS)	Rabobank	05:29:17
2.	Serguei Outschakov (UKR)	TVM–Farm Frites	—
3.	Jan Ullrich (GER)	Team Telekom	+ 0.01

=== 29-08-1998: Venray-Landgraaf, 237 km ===
RANK	NAME CYCLIST	TEAM	TIME
1.	Peter Wuyts (BEL)	Vlaanderen 2002–Eddy Merckx	04:04:43
2.	Morten Sonne (DEN)	Acceptcard Pro Cycling	—
3.	Jeroen Blijlevens (NED)	TVM–Farm Frites	+ 8.21

== Final classification ==
RANK	NAME CYCLIST	TEAM	TIME
1.	Rolf Sørensen (DEN)	Rabobank	21:08:06
2.	Viatcheslav Ekimov (RUS)	U.S. Postal Service	+ 0.02
3.	Peter Van Petegem (BEL)	TVM–Farm Frites	+ 0.10
4.	Lance Armstrong (USA)	U.S. Postal Service	+ 0.11
5.	Jan Ullrich (GER)	Team Telekom	+ 0.12
6.	Servais Knaven (NED)	TVM–Farm Frites	+ 0.15
7.	Serguei Honchar (UKR)	Cantina Tollo–Alexia Alluminio	+ 0.19
8.	Martin Rittsel (SUI)	Cantina Tollo–Alexia Alluminio	+ 0.02
9.	Robbie McEwen (AUS)	Rabobank	+ 0.51
10.	Maarten den Bakker (NED)	Rabobank	+ 0.53
