= Lutz Haueisen =

East German cyclist

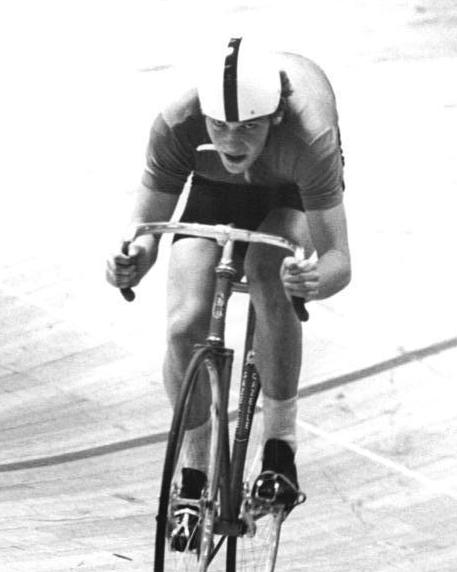
- Lutz Haueisen in 1978

Personal information
- Born: 12 October 1958 (age 67) Jena, Bezirk Gera, East Germany

Sport
- Sport: Cycling
Medal record
Representing East Germany
Track World Championships
Gold medal – first place	1979 Amsterdam	Team pursuit
Gold medal – first place	1981 Brno	Points race

Lutz Haueisen (born 12 October 1958) is a retired German amateur cyclist. He won two world titles in track events, in 1979 and 1981. His best achievement on the road was second place in the prologue of Tour de Pologne in 1986. His son Dennis (born 1978) is a professional road cyclist.
