= Steven Lammertink =

Dutch road cyclist

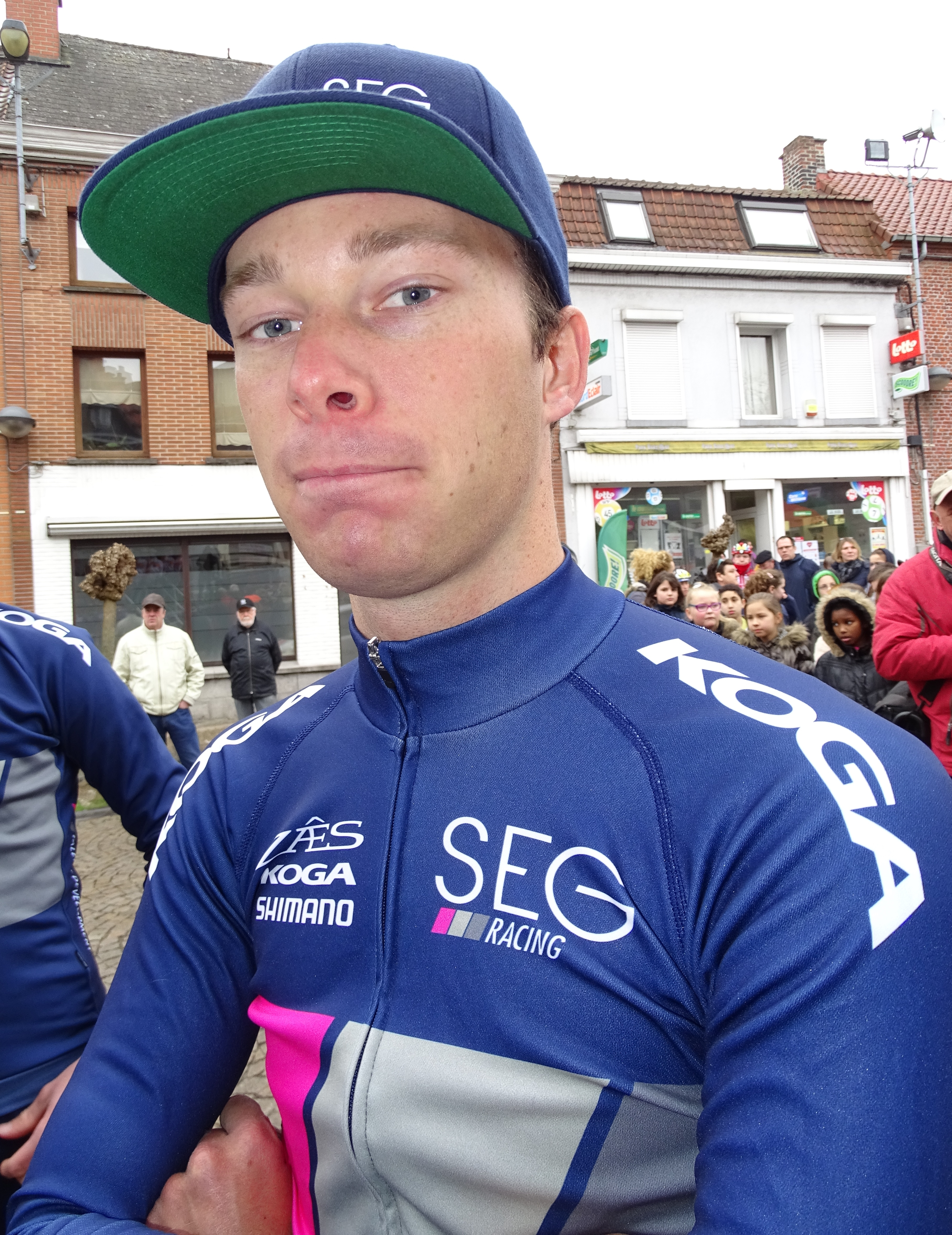
- Lammertink in 2015

Personal information
- Full name: Steven Lammertink
- Born: 4 December 1993 (age 32) Enter, Netherlands
- Height: 1.76 m (5 ft 9 in)
- Weight: 68 kg (150 lb)

Cycling career
- Sport: Cycling
- Current team: Retired
- Discipline: Road
- Role: Rider

Amateur teams
- 2014: Giant–Shimano (stagiaire)
- 2015: LottoNL–Jumbo (stagiaire)

Professional teams
- 2012–2014: Cycling Team Jo Piels
- 2015: SEG Racing
- 2016–2017: LottoNL–Jumbo
- 2018–2019: Vital Concept

Steven Lammertink (born 4 December 1993) is a Dutch former professional racing cyclist, who competed professionally between 2012 and 2019 for the Cycling Team Jo Piels, SEG Racing, LottoNL–Jumbo and Vital Concept–B&B Hotels teams. He rode at the 2013 UCI Road World Championships, and his older brother Maurits Lammertink is also a cyclist.

== Major results ==
2011
3rd Road race, UCI Road World Junior Championships
3rd Road race, National Junior Road Championships
10th Overall Trofeo Karlsberg
2013
2nd Omloop der Kempen
4th Overall Tour de Berlin
2014
1st Time trial, National Under-23 Road Championships
4th Time trial, UEC European Under-23 Road Championships
9th Overall Tour de Gironde
2015
1st Time trial, UEC European Under-23 Road Championships
1st Time trial, National Under-23 Road Championships
1st Overall Tour de Berlin

1st Stage 2 (ITT)

1st Stage 3 Le Triptyque des Monts et Châteaux
7th Liège–Bastogne–Liège Espoirs
8th Chrono Champenois
2016
4th Time trial, National Road Championships
2018
5th Chrono Champenois
