= Stefan van Dijk =

Dutch road bicycle racer (born 1976)

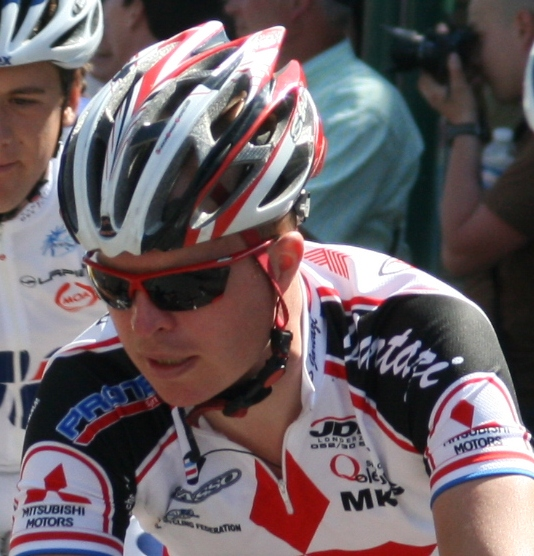
- Van Dijk at the 2008 Four Days of Dunkirk.

Personal information
- Full name: Stefan van Dijk
- Born: 22 January 1976 (age 50) Honselersdijk, the Netherlands

Cycling career
- Sport: Cycling
- Discipline: Road
- Role: Rider

Professional teams
- 2000: Team Cologne
- 2001: BankGiroLoterij-Batavus
- 2002–2004: Lotto–Adecco
- 2005: MrBookmaker.com–SportsTech
- 2007: Wiesenhof–Felt
- 2008: Mitsubishi–Jartazi
- 2009–2013: Verandas Willems

Stefan van Dijk (born 22 January 1976 in Honselersdijk, Netherlands) is a former professional road racing cyclist.

In November 2013, van Dijk announced his retirement from professional cycling, after fourteen seasons. Later that month, it emerged that van Dijk had illegally used ozone therapy during the 2011 season, and was given an eight-year ban as well as a €10,000 fine.

== Major results ==
1999
3rd Eurode Omloop
4th Ronde van Noord-Holland
8th Overall Circuit des Mines
1st Internationale Wielertrofee Jong Maar Moedig
10th Overall Olympia's Tour

1st Stage 3b (TTT)

2000
3rd Ronde van Noord-Holland
5th Ronde van Limburg
6th Groningen–Münster
7th Dokkum-Woudenomloop
7th Delta Profronde van Midden-Zeeland
9th GP Wielerrevue
2001
1st Ronde van Noord-Holland
1st Omloop van de Westkust
Course de la Solidarité Olympique

1st Stages 2 & 4a

1st Stage 1 Ronde van Nederland
3rd Omloop Wase Scheldeboorden
4th Kampioenschap van Vlaanderen
5th GP de Villers-Cotterêts
7th Trofeo Manacor
7th Trofeo Cala Rajada
8th Trofeo Mallorca
8th Henk Vos Memorial
10th OZ Tour Beneden-Maas
2002
1st National Road Race Championships
1st Omloop van de Vlaamse Scheldeboorden
GP Erik Breukink

1st Stages 1 & 3a

1st Stage 2 Danmark Rundt
2nd Rund um den Flughafen Köln
3rd Scheldeprijs
6th Memorial Rik Van Steenbergen
2003
1st Le Samyn
1st Ronde van Midden-Zeeland
1st Stage 3 Tour de Picardie
1st Stage 3 Tour of Qatar
2nd National Road Race Championships
3rd Grand Prix Rudy Dhaenens
3rd Omloop van de Vlaamse Scheldeboorden
4th Memorial Rik Van Steenbergen
6th Schaal Sels-Merksem
7th Veenendaal–Veenendaal
2004
1st Omloop van de Vlaamse Scheldeboorden
1st Dwars door Gendringen
1st Ronde van Noord-Holland
3rd Overall Tour de Picardie

1st Stage 3

3rd Delta Profronde van Midden-Zeeland
4th Grand Prix d'Ouverture La Marseillaise
4th Schaal Sels-Merksem
5th Tour de Rijke
6th GP SATS
2005
1st Noord-Nederland Tour
1st Tour de Rijke
1st Stage 5 Tour of Belgium
1st Stage 6 ENECO Tour of Benelux
2nd Paris–Brussels
2nd Grand Prix de Fourmies
2nd Grand Prix d'Isbergues
6th Grand Prix Rudy Dhaenens
6th Ronde van Noord-Holland
6th Schaal Sels-Merksem
6th Delta Profronde van Midden-Zeeland
2007
2nd Dutch Food Valley Classic
2nd Delta Profronde van Midden-Zeeland
2nd Schaal Sels-Merksem
3rd Overall Driedaagse van West-Vlaanderen
3rd Châteauroux Classic
3rd Tour de Rijke
3rd Omloop van de Vlaamse Scheldeboorden
3rd Münsterland Giro
4th Omloop van het Houtland
6th Profronde van Friesland
8th Omloop Het Volk
2008
1st Stage 2 Étoile de Bessèges
2nd Ronde van Drenthe
2nd Memorial Rik Van Steenbergen
2nd Kampioenschap van Vlaanderen
3rd Ronde van Noord-Holland
3rd Profronde van Friesland
4th Schaal Sels-Merksem
5th Scheldeprijs
5th Tour de Rijke
6th Overall Driedaagse van West-Vlaanderen
6th Ronde van het Groene Hart
7th Grand Prix de Denain
9th Dutch Food Valley Classic
10th Paris–Bourges
2009
2nd Polynormande
2nd Antwerpse Havenpijl
2nd Memorial Rik Van Steenbergen
2nd Nationale Sluitingsprijs
3rd Omloop der Kempen
4th Ronde van Noord-Holland
8th Overall Circuit Franco-Belge
8th Druivenkoers Overijse
2010
1st Arno Wallaard Memorial
1st Omloop van de Kempen
1st Grote Prijs Stad Zottegem
1st Omloop van het Houtland
Tour de Wallonie

1st Stage 2
Points classification

2nd Grand Prix Pino Cerami
2nd Schaal Sels-Merksem
3rd Dutch Food Valley Classic
3rd Paris–Brussels
3rd Nationale Sluitingsprijs
4th Ronde van Drenthe
4th Dwars door Drenthe
5th Antwerpse Havenpijl
7th Nokere Koerse
7th Ronde van Overijssel
7th Memorial Rik Van Steenbergen
9th Grote Prijs Jef Scherens
2011
1st Stage 1 Route du Sud
2nd Omloop van het Waasland
2nd Nokere Koerse
2nd Omloop van het Houtland
3rd Dutch Food Valley Classic
3rd Grand Prix de Fourmies
4th Scheldeprijs
4th Druivenkoers Overijse
4th Grote Prijs Jef Scherens
4th Memorial Rik Van Steenbergen
4th Paris–Brussels
5th Tour de Rijke
5th Nationale Sluitingsprijs
8th Kampioenschap van Vlaanderen
10th Schaal Sels-Merksem
2012
3rd Nationale Sluitingsprijs
6th Memorial Rik Van Steenbergen
8th Kuurne–Brussels–Kuurne
2013
8th Omloop van het Waasland
8th Ronde van Zeeland Seaports
8th Grote Prijs Stad Zottegem

Sporting positions
Preceded by Jans Koerts	Dutch National Road Race; Champion; 2002	Succeeded by Rudie Kemna
