= Memorial Rik Van Steenbergen =

Belgian cycling race

Race details
- Date: Early September
- Region: Arendonk, Belgium
- English name: Memorial Rik Van Steenbergen
- Local name(s): Memorial Rik Van Steenbergen (in Dutch)
- Discipline: Road
- Competition: UCI Europe Tour
- Type: Single-day
- Web site: www.memorialrikvansteenbergen.be

History
- First edition: 1991
- Editions: 24 (as of 2022)
- First winner: Olaf Ludwig (GER)
- Most wins: Niko Eeckhout (BEL) (4 wins)
- Most recent: Tim Merlier (BEL)

Memorial Rik Van Steenbergen (previously GP Rik Van Steenbergen) is a single-day road bicycle race held annually in September in Arendonk, Belgium. The race, paying respect to the famous Belgian rider of the 1940s and 1950s, quickly gained importance and since 2005, it is a 1.1 event on the UCI Europe Tour. The race was canceled in 2013 and again in 2014 because the organizers were unable to raise sufficient funding and subsequently disappeared permanently from the calendar before being revived for 2019. In contrary to the previous editions, the race will now be held in Arendonk where before it was held in Aartselaar.

== Winners ==
Year	Country	Rider	Team
1991	Germany	Olaf Ludwig	Panasonic–Sportlife
1992	Belgium	Patrick Deneut	Lotto
1993	Italy	Mario Cipollini	GB–MG Maglificio
1994	Uzbekistan	Djamolidine Abdoujaparov	Team Polti
1995	Belgium	Tom Steels	Vlaanderen 2002–Eddy Merckx
1996	Netherlands	Jans Koerts	Palmans
1997	Belgium	Andrei Tchmil	Lotto–Mobistar–Isoglass
1998	Czech Republic	Ján Svorada	Mapei–Bricobi
1999	Italy	Giuliano Figueras	Mapei–Quick-Step
2000	Denmark	Lars Michaelsen	Française des Jeux
2001	Belgium	Niko Eeckhout	Lotto–Adecco
2002	Germany	Steffen Radochla	Team Coast
2003	Belgium	Niko Eeckhout	Lotto–Domo
2004	Belgium	Tom Boonen	Quick-Step–Davitamon
2005	France	Jean-Patrick Nazon	AG2R Prévoyance
2006	Belgium	Niko Eeckhout	Chocolade Jacques–Topsport Vlaanderen
2007	Belgium	Greg Van Avermaet	Predictor–Lotto
2008	Belgium	Gert Steegmans	Quick-Step
2009	Belgium	Niko Eeckhout	An Post–Sean Kelly Team
2010	Belgium	Michael Van Staeyen	Topsport Vlaanderen–Mercator
2011	Netherlands	Kenny van Hummel	Skil–Shimano
2012	Netherlands	Theo Bos	Rabobank
2013 to 2018	No race due to insufficient funding		
2019	Belgium	Dries De Bondt	Corendon–Circus
2020 to 2021	No race due to COVID-19 pandemic in Belgium		
2022	Belgium	Tim Merlier	Alpecin–Deceuninck

== See also ==
- Rik Van Steenbergen
