= Jonas Castrique =

Belgian racing cyclist

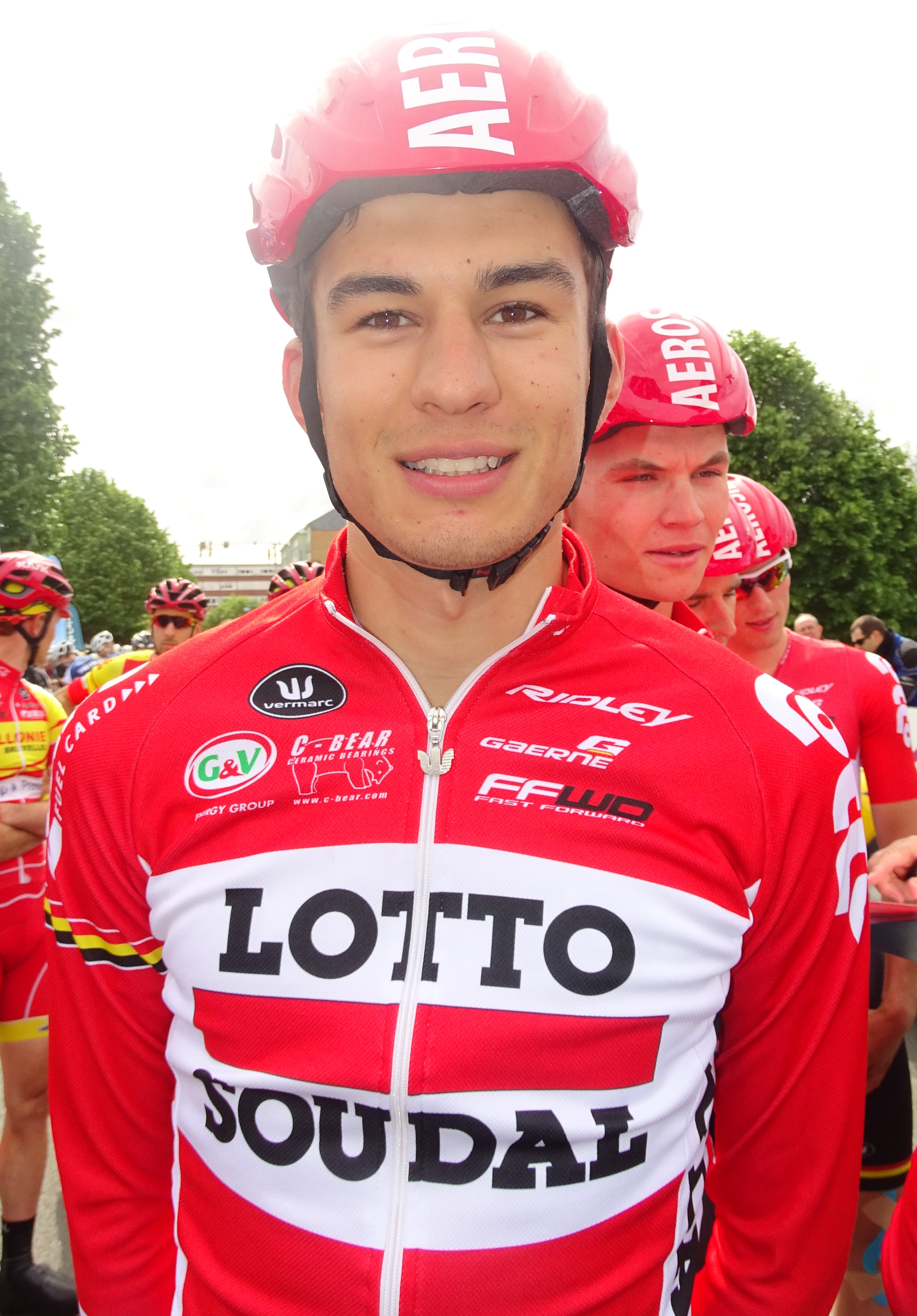
- Castrique in 2016

Personal information
- Born: 13 January 1997 (age 29) Roeselare, Belgium
- Height: 1.87 m (6 ft 2 in)
- Weight: 81 kg (179 lb)

Cycling career
- Sport: Cycling
- Current team: Wagner Bazin WB
- Discipline: Road
- Role: Rider

Amateur teams
- 2014–2015: Zannata Lotto
- 2016–2018: Lotto–Soudal U23
- 2019: Wallonie–Bruxelles Development Team
- 2019: Wallonie Bruxelles (stagiaire)

Professional team
- 2020–: Bingoal–Wallonie Bruxelles

Jonas Castrique (born 13 January 1997) is a Belgian professional racing cyclist, who currently rides for UCI ProTeam Wagner Bazin WB. In October 2020, he rode in the 2020 Gent–Wevelgem race in Belgium.

== Major results ==
2016
7th Overall Carpathian Couriers Race
2017
9th Overall Olympia's Tour
2019
6th Grand Prix Criquielion
8th Kattekoers
