= Arnhem–Veenendaal Classic =

Dutch cycling race

Race details
- Date: August
- Region: Utrecht, Netherlands
- Local name: Arnhem–Veenendaal Classic
- Discipline: Road
- Competition: UCI Europe Tour
- Type: Single-day
- Web site: veenendaal-veenendaal.nl

History
- First edition: 1985
- Editions: 38 (as of 2026)
- First winner: Joop Zoetemelk (NED)
- Most wins: Dylan Groenewegen (NED) (5 wins)
- Most recent: Matteo Moschetti (ITA)

The Arnhem–Veenendaal Classic (known as Veenendaal–Veenendaal from 1985 until 2006 and The Dutch Food Valley Classic from 2007 until 2013) is a semi classic professional road cycling race in the Netherlands starting and finishing in the town of Veenendaal. The event is part of the UCI Europe Tour calendar of events with a ranking of 1.1.

== Route ==
The race has a course on winding roads through the two Veluwe national parks, Hoge Veluwe National Park and Veluwezoom National Park, and the Nederrijn river valley in the south east corner of Utrecht province over a distance of roughly 209 km, interspersed with little steep cobbled climbs, the most significant of which are the Grebbeberg and the Posbank in Rhenen, and the Emma Pyramid in Rozendaal. Although the city of Arnhem is featured in the title of the race, it both starts and finishes in the town of Veenendaal, but goes to and from Arnhem during the race. It also passes close to Wageningen, the centre of the Food Valley, which formerly sponsored the name of the race.

== History ==
The race was created in 1985 by the Royal Dutch Cycling Union who wanted to create a preparation race in August just before the World Championships. Between 1985 and 2006 the race was known as Veenendaal–Veenendaal. Over the years it has been run at three different times on the international cycling calendar. In 1994 the event was moved to mid-April and given a date on a Thursday, the day after La Flèche Wallonne and a few days before Liège–Bastogne–Liège. The race organisers were never happy with this because it reduced the quality of the field with the top teams unwilling to race three times in four days, however in 2004 the UCI agreed to a date change to a less intense week on the Friday after Paris–Roubaix and two days before the biggest one-day race in the Netherlands, the Amstel Gold Race. However the event was moved to yet another new date in 2006, with the race taking place in June, away from the congested spring classics calendar and no longer competing in the same midweek with the Scheldeprijs. For the 2010 season, another date change is scheduled: the race will move to mid-August.

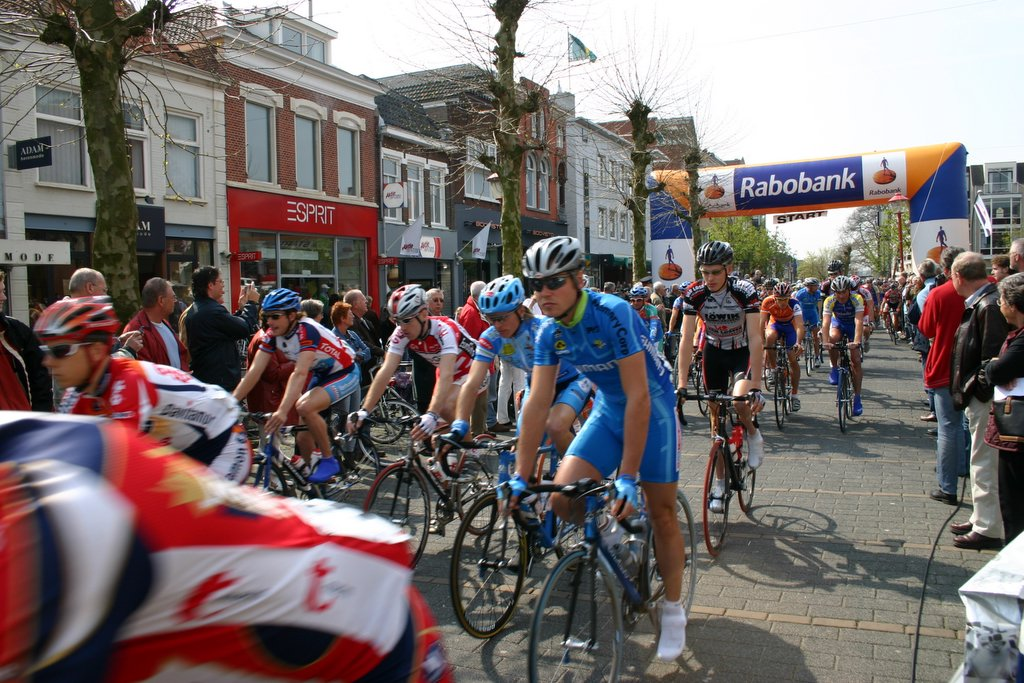
Riders before the start in 2005

In 2005 Veenendaal–Veenendaal benefited from the creation of the new UCI ProTour structure when it was elevated to 1.HC standard bringing to the same level as Belgium's Omloop "Het Volk" and Germany's Rund um den Henninger Turm, thus bringing more sponsorship and publicity. In 2001 the race looked like being cancelled as the Foot and Mouth outbreak hit the Netherlands but the race eventually went ahead as the organisers modified the route to avoid sensitive areas. The 2007 race brought on board the Dutch organisation Food Valley as main sponsors and the event had the alternative title of The Dutch Food Valley Classic. Until 2008, the race always started in Veenendaal, but in 2009 the race started in Barneveld. From 2014 onwards, the race became known in Dutch as the Arnhem–Veenendaal Classic, reflecting a new start location in Arnhem.

The 2025 edition of the race will not take place owing to a lack of police availability due to the NATO summit at The Hague.

== Women's race ==
In 2018, a women's race was added to the programme. The race was classified as a 1.1 UCI race and won by Annemiek van Vleuten. However, in 2019 the women's race was removed from the programme again with the organisers citing a lack of availability of police support for the race. In 2022, the women's race was put back on the cycling calendar and is held on the day before the men's race.

== Results ==
=== Men's race ===
List of winners:

Year	Country	Rider	Team
1985	Netherlands	Joop Zoetemelk	Kwantum–Decosol–Yoko
1986	No race		
1987	Belgium	Johan Capiot	Roland–Skala
1988	Belgium	Ronny Vlassaks	Superconfex–Yoko–Opel–Colnago
1989	Netherlands	Jean-Paul van Poppel	Panasonic–Isostar–Colnago–Agu
1990	Netherlands	Wiebren Veenstra	Buckler–Colnago–Decca
1991	Netherlands	Wiebren Veenstra	Buckler–Colnago–Decca
1992	Netherlands	Jacques Hanegraaf	Panasonic–Sportlife
1993	Netherlands	Rob Mulders	WordPerfect–Colnago–Decca
1994	Russia	Viatcheslav Ekimov	WordPerfect–Colnago–Decca
1995	Germany	Olaf Ludwig	Team Telekom
1996	Ukraine	Andrei Tchmil	Lotto
1997	Netherlands	Jeroen Blijlevens	TVM–Farm Frites
1998	Denmark	Frank Høj	Palmans–Ideal
1999	Netherlands	Tristan Hoffman	TVM–Farm Frites
2000	Netherlands	Steven de Jongh	Rabobank
2001	Netherlands	Steven de Jongh	Rabobank
2002	Netherlands	Bobbie Traksel	Rabobank
2003	Netherlands	Léon van Bon	Lotto–Domo
2004	Italy	Simone Cadamuro	De Nardi–Piemme Telekom
2005	Netherlands	Paul van Schalen	AXA Pro-Cycling Team
2006	Belgium	Tom Boonen	Quick-Step–Innergetic
2007	Germany	Steffen Radochla	Wiesenhof–Felt
2008	Germany	Robert Förster	Gerolsteiner
2009	Netherlands	Kenny van Hummel	Skil–Shimano
2010	Norway	Edvald Boasson Hagen	Team Sky
2011	Netherlands	Theo Bos	Rabobank
2012	Netherlands	Theo Bos	Rabobank
2013	Italy	Elia Viviani	Cannondale
2014	Belgium	Yves Lampaert	Topsport Vlaanderen–Baloise
2015	Netherlands	Dylan Groenewegen	Team Roompot
2016	Netherlands	Dylan Groenewegen	LottoNL–Jumbo
2017	Slovenia	Luka Mezgec	Orica–Scott
2018	Netherlands	Dylan Groenewegen	LottoNL–Jumbo
2019	Australia	Zak Dempster	Israel Cycling Academy
2020–2021	No race		
2022	Netherlands	Dylan Groenewegen	Team BikeExchange–Jayco
2023	Netherlands	Dylan Groenewegen	Team Jayco–AlUla
2024	Norway	Tord Gudmestad	Uno-X Mobility
2025	No race		
2026	Italy	Matteo Moschetti	Pinarello–Q36.5 Pro Cycling Team

=== Women's race ===
Year	Country	Rider	Team
2019	Netherlands	Annemiek van Vleuten	Mitchelton–Scott
2020–2021	No race		
2022	France	Gladys Verhulst	Le Col–Wahoo
2023	Belgium	Lotte Kopecky	SD Worx
2024	Netherlands	Riejanne Markus	Visma–Lease a Bike
2025	No race		
2026	Netherlands	Charlotte Kool	Pinarello–Q36.5 Pro Cycling Team
