= BankGiroLoterij =

Bankgiroloterij
Team information
- Registered: Netherlands
- Founded: 1999
- Disbanded: 2004
- Discipline: Road

Team name history
- 1999–2003 2004: Bankgiroloterij–Batavus; Bankgiroloterij

BankGiroLoterij was the name of a Dutch professional road bicycle racing team. The main sponsor from 1999 to 2004 was a Dutch lottery operator BankGiro Loterij (in Dutch). No sponsor was available for 2005, so the team disbanded. At that time, they were placed 29th in Division 1 in the UCI Road World Rankings. A significant number of the team riders joined Team Shimano-Memory Corp, after its merge with Japanese team Shimano.
