= 2008 Eneco Tour =

2008 UCI ProTour, race 11 of 15
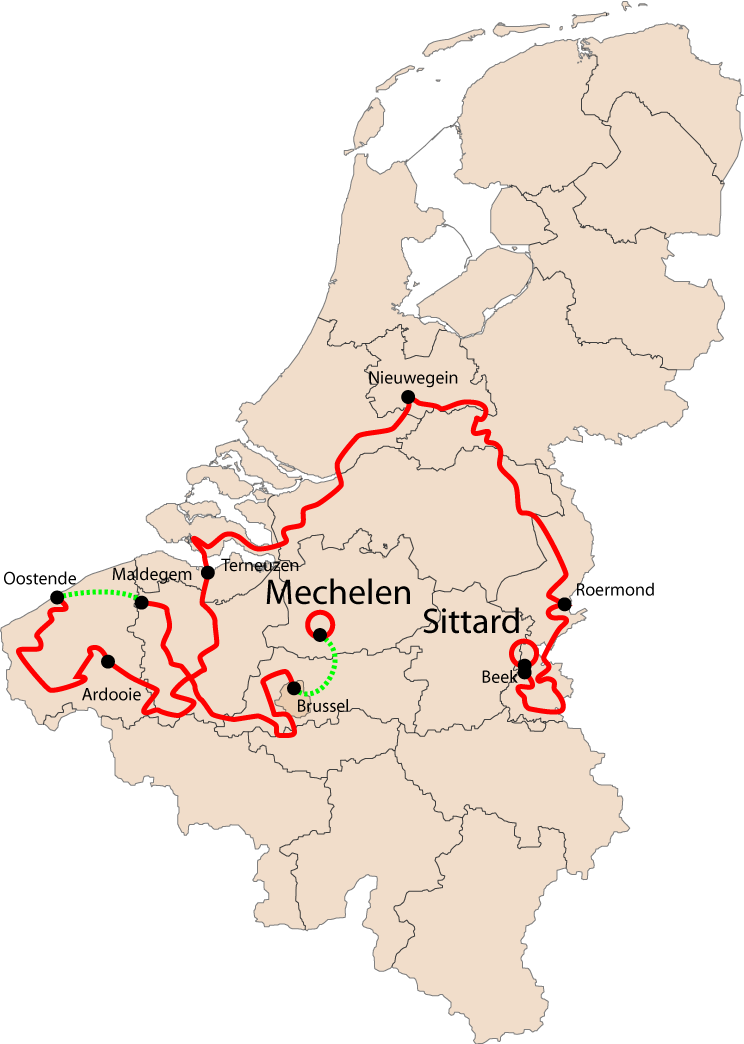

Race details
- Dates: 20 to 27 August 2008
- Stages: 7
- Winning time: 26h 27' 07"

Results
| | Winner | Iván Gutiérrez (ESP) | (Caisse d'Epargne) |
| | Second | Sébastien Rosseler (BEL) | (Quick-Step) |
| | Third | Michael Rogers (AUS) | (Team Columbia) |
| | Points | Jürgen Roelandts (BEL) | (Silence–Lotto) |
| | Team | Team Columbia | |

The 2008 Eneco Tour of Benelux cycling road race takes place from 20 to 27 August 2008 in the Benelux. Like the previous years, parts of the Netherlands and Belgium are covered. The 18 UCI ProTour teams are participating and two extra teams were invited, namely Cycle Collstrop and Skil–Shimano who were each given a wild card.

== Schedule ==
| Stage | Route | Distance | Date | Winner |
|---|---|---|---|---|
| P | Sittard (Netherlands) > Geleen (Netherlands) | 4.4 km | Wednesday 20 August | Iván Gutiérrez (ESP) |
| 1 | Beek (Netherlands) > Roermond (Netherlands) | 175.6 km | Thursday 21 August | Tom Boonen (BEL) |
| 2 | Roermond (Netherlands) > Nieuwegein (Netherlands) | 175.0 km | Friday 22 August | André Greipel (GER) |
| 3 | Nieuwegein (Netherlands) > Terneuzen (Netherlands) | 189.3 km | Saturday 23 August | Daniele Bennati (ITA) |
| 4 | Terneuzen (Netherlands) > Ardooie (Belgium) | 212.4 km | Sunday 24 August | Tom Boonen (BEL) |
| 5 | Ardooie (Belgium) > Ostend (Belgium) | 171.8 km | Monday 25 August | Carlo Westphal (GER) |
| 6 | Maldegem (Belgium) > Brussels (Belgium) | 184.0 km | Tuesday 26 August | Edvald Boasson Hagen (NOR) |
| 7 (ITT) | Mechelen (Belgium) > Mechelen (Belgium) | 18.8 km | Wednesday 27 August | Raivis Belohvoščiks (LAT) |

== Stages ==
=== Prologue – 20 August 2008 ===
Prologue Result

| | Cyclist | Team | Time |
|---|---|---|---|
| 1 | Iván Gutiérrez (ESP) | Caisse d'Epargne | 5' 31" |
| 2 | Cyril Lemoine (FRA) | Crédit Agricole | + 0" |
| 3 | Edvald Boasson Hagen (NOR) | Team Columbia | + 1" |

General classification after the Prologue

| | Cyclist | Team | Time |
|---|---|---|---|
| 1 | Iván Gutiérrez (ESP) | Caisse d'Epargne | 5' 31" |
| 2 | Cyril Lemoine (FRA) | Crédit Agricole | + 0" |
| 3 | Edvald Boasson Hagen (NOR) | Team Columbia | + 1" |

=== Stage 1 – 21 August 2008 ===
Stage 1 Result

| | Cyclist | Team | Time |
|---|---|---|---|
| 1 | Tom Boonen (BEL) | Quick-Step | 4h 16' 17" |
| 2 | Daniele Bennati (ITA) | Liquigas | s.t. |
| 3 | Fabio Sabatini (ITA) | Team Milram | s.t. |

General classification after Stage 1

| | Cyclist | Team | Time |
|---|---|---|---|
| 1 | Iván Gutiérrez (ESP) | Caisse d'Epargne | 4h 21' 46" |
| 2 | Cyril Lemoine (FRA) | Crédit Agricole | + 2" |
| 3 | Edvald Boasson Hagen (NOR) | Team Columbia | + 3" |

=== Stage 2 – 22 August 2008 ===
Stage 2 Result

| | Cyclist | Team | Time |
|---|---|---|---|
| 1 | André Greipel (GER) | Team Columbia | 3h 51' 31" |
| 2 | Juan José Haedo (ARG) | CSC–Saxo Bank | s.t. |
| 3 | Robert Förster (GER) | Gerolsteiner | s.t. |

General classification after Stage 2

| | Cyclist | Team | Time |
|---|---|---|---|
| 1 | Iván Gutiérrez (ESP) | Caisse d'Epargne | 8h 13' 17" |
| 2 | Edvald Boasson Hagen (NOR) | Team Columbia | + 0" |
| 3 | Cyril Lemoine (FRA) | Crédit Agricole | + 1" |

=== Stage 3 – 23 August 2008 ===
Stage 3 Result

| | Cyclist | Team | Time |
|---|---|---|---|
| 1 | Daniele Bennati (ITA) | Liquigas | 4h 43' 33" |
| 2 | Tom Boonen (BEL) | Quick-Step | s.t. |
| 3 | Jürgen Roelandts (BEL) | Silence–Lotto | s.t. |

General classification after Stage 3

| | Cyclist | Team | Time |
|---|---|---|---|
| 1 | Daniele Bennati (ITA) | Liquigas | 12h 59' 21" |
| 2 | Edvald Boasson Hagen (NOR) | Team Columbia | + 1" |
| 3 | André Greipel (GER) | Team Columbia | + 4" |

=== Stage 4 – 24 August 2008 ===
Stage 4 Result

| | Cyclist | Team | Time |
|---|---|---|---|
| 1 | Tom Boonen (BEL) | Quick-Step | 5h 00' 35" |
| 2 | Kenny van Hummel (NED) | Skil–Shimano | s.t. |
| 3 | Edvald Boasson Hagen (NOR) | Team Columbia | s.t. |

General classification after Stage 4

| | Cyclist | Team | Time |
|---|---|---|---|
| 1 | André Greipel (GER) | Team Columbia | 17h 59' 51" |
| 2 | Edvald Boasson Hagen (NOR) | Team Columbia | + 2" |
| 3 | Tom Boonen (BEL) | Quick-Step | + 7" |

=== Stage 5 – 25 August 2008 ===
Stage 5 Result

| | Cyclist | Team | Time |
|---|---|---|---|
| 1 | Carlo Westphal (GER) | Gerolsteiner | 3h 59' 03" |
| 2 | Yauheni Hutarovich (BLR) | Française des Jeux | s.t. |
| 3 | Borut Božič (SLO) | Cycle Collstrop | s.t. |

General classification after Stage 5

| | Cyclist | Team | Time |
|---|---|---|---|
| 1 | André Greipel (GER) | Team Columbia | 21h 57' 26" |
| 2 | Iván Gutiérrez (ESP) | Caisse d'Epargne | + 11" |
| 3 | Jürgen Roelandts (BEL) | Silence–Lotto | + 12" |

=== Stage 6 – 26 August 2008 ===
Stage 6 Result

| | Cyclist | Team | Time |
|---|---|---|---|
| 1 | Edvald Boasson Hagen (NOR) | Team Columbia | 4h 07' 20" |
| 2 | Jimmy Engoulvent (FRA) | Crédit Agricole | s.t. |
| 3 | Sergei Ivanov (RUS) | Astana | s.t. |

General classification after Stage 6

| | Cyclist | Team | Time |
|---|---|---|---|
| 1 | André Greipel (GER) | Team Columbia | 26h 04' 46" |
| 2 | Iván Gutiérrez (ESP) | Caisse d'Epargne | + 11" |
| 3 | Jürgen Roelandts (BEL) | Silence–Lotto | + 12" |

=== Stage 7 – 27 August 2008 (ITT) ===
Stage 7 Result

| | Cyclist | Team | Time |
|---|---|---|---|
| 1 | Raivis Belohvoščiks (LAT) | Scott–American Beef | 22' 04" |
| 2 | Iván Gutiérrez (ESP) | Caisse d'Epargne | + 6" |
| 3 | Sébastien Rosseler (BEL) | Quick-Step | s.t. |

General classification after Stage 7

| | Cyclist | Team | Time |
|---|---|---|---|
| 1 | Iván Gutiérrez (ESP) | Caisse d'Epargne | 26h 27' 07" |
| 2 | Sébastien Rosseler (BEL) | Quick-Step | + 4" |
| 3 | Michael Rogers (AUS) | Team Columbia | + 7" |

== Points Classification ==
The leader of the points classification wears a red jersey.

=== Points in Prologue ===
Although in most stage races, the organisation gives away some points in the prologue, these were not given this year.

=== Points in Stage 1 ===
1st Eneco Sprint after (45 km)

| First | Bram Tankink (Netherlands) | Rabobank | 8 Pts. and 3" |
| Second | Floris Goesinnen (Netherlands) | Skil–Shimano | 5 Pts. and 2" |
| Third | Iván Gutiérrez (Spain) | Caisse d'Epargne | 3 Pts. and 1" |

2nd Eneco Sprint after (98 km)

| First | Bram Tankink (Netherlands) | Rabobank | 8 Pts. and 3" |
| Second | Floris Goesinnen (Netherlands) | Skil–Shimano | 5 Pts. and 2" |
| Third | Iván Gutiérrez (Spain) | Caisse d'Epargne | 3 Pts. and 1" |

3rd Eneco Sprint after (156 km)

| First | Bram Tankink (Netherlands) | Rabobank | 8 Pts. and 3" |
| Second | Floris Goesinnen (Netherlands) | Skil–Shimano | 5 Pts. and 2" |
| Third | Michiel Elijzen (Netherlands) | Rabobank | 3 Pts. and 1" |

Finish in Roermond after (175.6 km)

| First | Tom Boonen (Belgium) | Quick-Step | 30 Pts. and 10" |
| Second | Daniele Bennati (Italy) | Liquigas | 25 Pts. and 6" |
| Third | Fabio Sabatini (Italy) | Team Milram | 22 Pts. and 4" |
| 4th | Jürgen Roelandts (Belgium) | Silence–Lotto | 19 Pts. |
| 5th | Heinrich Haussler (Germany) | Gerolsteiner | 17 Pts. |
| 6th | Edvald Boasson Hagen (Norway) | Team Columbia | 15 Pts. |
| 7th | Angelo Furlan (Italy) | Crédit Agricole | 13 Pts. |
| 8th | Kenny van Hummel (Netherlands) | Skil–Shimano | 12 Pts. |
| 9th | Elia Rigotto (Italy) | Team Milram | 11 Pts. |
| 10th | Aurélien Clerc (Switzerland) | Bouygues Télécom | 10 Pts. |

=== Points in Stage 2 ===
1st Eneco Sprint after (26 km)

| First | Edvald Boasson Hagen (Norway) | Team Columbia | 8 Pts. and 3" |
| Second | Jürgen Roelandts (Belgium) | Silence–Lotto | 5 Pts. and 2" |
| Third | Cyril Lemoine (France) | Crédit Agricole | 3 Pts. and 1" |

2nd Eneco Sprint after (123 km)

| First | Ermanno Capelli (Italy) | Scott–American Beef | 8 Pts. and 3" |
| Second | Matthé Pronk (Netherlands) | Cycle Collstrop | 5 Pts. and 2" |
| Third | Javier Aramendia (Spain) | Euskaltel–Euskadi | 3 Pts. and 1" |

3rd Eneco Sprint after (155 km)

| First | Ermanno Capelli (Italy) | Scott–American Beef | 8 Pts. and 3" |
| Second | Matthé Pronk (Netherlands) | Cycle Collstrop | 5 Pts. and 2" |
| Third | Javier Aramendia (Spain) | Euskaltel–Euskadi | 3 Pts. and 1" |

Finish in Nieuwegein after (175 km)

| First | André Greipel (Germany) | Team Columbia | 30 Pts. and 10" |
| Second | Juan José Haedo (Argentina) | CSC–Saxo Bank | 25 Pts. and 6" |
| Third | Robert Förster (Germany) | Gerolsteiner | 22 Pts. and 4" |
| 4th | Kenny van Hummel (Netherlands) | Skil–Shimano | 19 Pts. |
| 5th | Tom Boonen (Belgium) | Quick-Step | 17 Pts. |
| 6th | Edvald Boasson Hagen (Norway) | Team Columbia | 15 Pts. |
| 7th | Jürgen Roelandts (Belgium) | Silence–Lotto | 13 Pts. |
| 8th | Francesco Chicchi (Italy) | Liquigas | 12 Pts. |
| 9th | David Kopp (Germany) | Cycle Collstrop | 11 Pts. |
| 10th | Elia Rigotto (Italy) | Team Milram | 10 Pts. |

=== Points in Stage 3 ===
1st Eneco Sprint after (80 km)

| First | Raúl Alarcón (Spain) | Scott–American Beef | 8 Pts. and 3" |
| Second | Matthé Pronk (Netherlands) | Cycle Collstrop | 5 Pts. and 2" |
| Third | Aitor Hernández (Spain) | Euskaltel–Euskadi | 3 Pts. and 1" |

2nd Eneco Sprint after (127 km)

| First | Laurent Mangel (France) | Ag2r–La Mondiale | 8 Pts. and 3" |
| Second | Raúl Alarcón (Spain) | Scott–American Beef | 5 Pts. and 2" |
| Third | Matthé Pronk (Netherlands) | Cycle Collstrop | 3 Pts. and 1" |

3rd Eneco Sprint after (147 km)

| First | Edvald Boasson Hagen (Norway) | Team Columbia | 8 Pts. and 3" |
| Second | André Greipel (Germany) | Team Columbia | 5 Pts. and 2" |
| Third | Sébastien Rosseler (Belgium) | Quick-Step | 3 Pts. and 1" |

Finish in Terneuzen after (185 km)

| First | Daniele Bennati (Italy) | Liquigas | 30 Pts. and 10" |
| Second | Tom Boonen (Belgium) | Quick-Step | 25 Pts. and 6" |
| Third | Jürgen Roelandts (Belgium) | Silence–Lotto | 22 Pts. and 4" |
| 4th | Kenny van Hummel (Netherlands) | Skil–Shimano | 19 Pts. |
| 5th | Borut Božič (Slovenia) | Cycle Collstrop | 17 Pts. |
| 6th | Tom Leezer (Netherlands) | Rabobank | 15 Pts. |
| 7th | Alberto Curtolo (Italy) | Liquigas | 13 Pts. |
| 8th | David Kopp (Germany) | Cycle Collstrop | 12 Pts. |
| 9th | Robert Förster (Germany) | Gerolsteiner | 11 Pts. |
| 10th | Roger Hammond (United Kingdom) | Team Columbia | 10 Pts. |

== Jersey progress ==
| Stage (Winner) | General classification | Points Classification | Team Classification |
|---|---|---|---|
| Prologue (ITT) (Iván Gutiérrez) | Iván Gutiérrez | not awarded | Caisse d'Epargne |
| Stage 1 (Tom Boonen) | Iván Gutiérrez | Tom Boonen | Caisse d'Epargne |
| Stage 2 (André Greipel) | Iván Gutiérrez | Tom Boonen | Team Columbia |
| Stage 3 (Daniele Bennati) | Daniele Bennati | Tom Boonen | Caisse d'Epargne |
| Stage 4 (Tom Boonen) | André Greipel | Tom Boonen | Caisse d'Epargne |
| Stage 5 (Carlo Westphal) | André Greipel | Jürgen Roelandts | Team Columbia |
| Stage 6 (Edvald Boasson Hagen) | André Greipel | Jürgen Roelandts | Team Columbia |
| Stage 7 (ITT) (Raivis Belohvoščiks) | Iván Gutiérrez | Jürgen Roelandts | Team Columbia |
| Final | Iván Gutiérrez | Jürgen Roelandts | Team Columbia |

- During stage 5, Kenny van Hummel wore the points jersey as Tom Boonen did not start the stage.

== Withdrawals ==
All teams were allowed to start with 8 riders. For 20 teams this would create a starting field of 160 riders. Just like previous years however, some teams chose to start with fewer riders, which reduced the number riders on the official starting list to 151. Astana, Bouygues Télécom, Cofidis and Euskaltel–Euskadi started with 7 riders, Gerolsteiner started with 6 riders and only 5 riders were selected for team Lampre.

| | Stage | Rider | Team | Reason |
|---|---|---|---|---|
| DNF | 1 | Dionisio Galparsoro (ESP) | Euskaltel–Euskadi | Unknown |
| DNF | 1 | Steve Morabito (SUI) | Astana | Unknown |
| DNS | 2 | Gianni Meersman (BEL) | Française des Jeux | Unknown |
| DNF | 2 | André Steensen (DEN) | CSC–Saxo Bank | Unknown |
| DNF | 2 | Nicolas Crosbie (FRA) | Bouygues Télécom | Unknown |
| DNS | 3 | Philippe Gilbert (BEL) | Française des Jeux | Unknown |
| DNF | 4 | Joan Horrach (ESP) | Caisse d'Epargne | Unknown |
| DNF | 4 | Michiel Elijzen (NED) | Rabobank | Unknown |
| DNF | 4 | Stephan Schreck (GER) | Gerolsteiner | Unknown |
| DNF | 4 | Artur Gajek (GER) | Team Milram | Unknown |
| DNF | 4 | Yuriy Krivtsov (UKR) | Ag2r–La Mondiale | Unknown |
| DNF | 4 | Jean-Patrick Nazon (FRA) | Ag2r–La Mondiale | Unknown |
| DNF | 4 | Stéphane Poulhies (FRA) | Ag2r–La Mondiale | Unknown |
| DNF | 4 | Juan José Haedo (ARG) | CSC–Saxo Bank | Unknown |
| DNF | 4 | Fabio Baldato (ITA) | Lampre | Injured after crash |
| DNS | 5 | Glenn D'Hollander (BEL) | Silence–Lotto | Unknown |
| DNS | 5 | Maarten Tjallingii (NED) | Silence–Lotto | Unknown |
| DNS | 5 | Tom Boonen (BEL) | Quick-Step | Unknown |
| DNS | 5 | Thomas Fothen (GER) | Gerolsteiner | Unknown |
| DNS | 5 | Heinrich Haussler (GER) | Gerolsteiner | Unknown |
| DNS | 5 | Daniele Bennati (ITA) | Liquigas | Unknown |
| DNS | 5 | Mickaël Delage (FRA) | Française des Jeux | Unknown |
| DNS | 5 | Jelle Vanendert (BEL) | Française des Jeux | Unknown |
| DNS | 5 | Matti Breschel (DEN) | CSC–Saxo Bank | Unknown |
| DNS | 5 | Jurgen Van Goolen (BEL) | CSC–Saxo Bank | Unknown |
| DNS | 5 | Aurélien Clerc (SUI) | Bouygues Télécom | Unknown |
| DNS | 5 | Olivier Bonnaire (FRA) | Bouygues Télécom | Unknown |
| DNF | 5 | Mathieu Drujon (FRA) | Caisse d'Epargne | Unknown |
| DNF | 5 | Claudio Corioni (ITA) | Liquigas | Unknown |
| DNF | 5 | Enrico Franzoi (ITA) | Liquigas | Unknown |
| DNF | 5 | Sergey Lagutin (UZB) | Cycle Collstrop | Unknown |
| DNF | 5 | Jeremy Hunt (GBR) | Crédit Agricole | Unknown |
| DNF | 5 | Christophe Kern (FRA) | Crédit Agricole | Unknown |
| DNF | 5 | Cyril Lemoine (FRA) | Crédit Agricole | Unknown |
| DNF | 5 | Yannick Talabardon (FRA) | Crédit Agricole | Unknown |
| DNS | 6 | Sebastian Siedler (GER) | Skil–Shimano | Unknown |
| DNS | 6 | Dennis Haueisen (GER) | Team Milram | Unknown |

== UCI ProTour Points ==
The Eneco Tour of Benelux 2008 is part of the UCI ProTour and so the riders can earn UCI ProTour Points. Below is states which riders won points and where. Because the Eneco Tour of Benelux 2008 is a smaller stage race the points given are 3, 2 and 1 for the first three in each stage result. At the end of the tour, the top 10 in the standings receive points accorded as follows: 50, 40, 35, 30, 25, 20, 15, 10, 5 and 2.

=== Stage Results ===
| Stage | Route | First (3 Points) | Second (2 Points) | Third (1 Points) |
|---|---|---|---|---|
| P | Sittard (Netherlands) – Geleen (Netherlands) | Iván Gutiérrez (Spain) | Cyril Lemoine (France) | Edvald Boasson Hagen (Norway) |
| 1 | Beek (Netherlands) – Roermond (Netherlands) | Tom Boonen (Belgium) | Daniele Bennati (Italy) | Fabio Sabatini (Italy) |
| 2 | Roermond (Netherlands) – Nieuwegein (Netherlands) | André Greipel (Germany) | Juan José Haedo (Argentina) | Robert Förster (Germany) |
| 3 | Nieuwegein (Netherlands) – Terneuzen (Netherlands) | Daniele Bennati (Italy) | Tom Boonen (Belgium) | Jürgen Roelandts (Belgium) |
| 4 | Terneuzen (Netherlands) – Ardooie (Belgium) | Tom Boonen (Belgium) | No UCI ProTour points awarded for Kenny van Hummel (Netherlands) (Skil–Shimano) | Edvald Boasson Hagen (Norway) |
| 5 | Ardooie (Belgium) – Ostend (Belgium) | Carlo Westphal (Germany) | Yauheni Hutarovich (Belarus) | No UCI ProTour points awarded for Borut Božič (Slovenia) (Cycle Collstrop) |
| 6 | Maldegem (Belgium) – Brussels (Belgium) | Edvald Boasson Hagen (Norway) | Jimmy Engoulvent (France) | Sergei Ivanov (Russia) |
| 7 (ITT) | Mechelen (Belgium) – Mechelen (Belgium) | Raivis Belohvoščiks (Latvia) | Iván Gutiérrez (Spain) | Sébastien Rosseler (Belgium) |

=== Overall result ===
| | Cyclist | Points |
|---|---|---|
| 1 | Iván Gutiérrez (Spain) | 50 |
| 2 | Sébastien Rosseler (Belgium) | 40 |
| 3 | Michael Rogers (Australia) | 35 |
| 4 | Stijn Devolder (Belgium) | 30 |
| 5 | André Greipel (Germany) | 25 |
| 6 | Joost Posthuma (Netherlands) | 20 |
| 7 | Servais Knaven (Netherlands) | 15 |
| 8 | Bram Tankink (Netherlands) | 10 |
| 9 | Jürgen Roelandts (Belgium) | 5 |
| 10 | Piet Rooijakkers (Netherlands) | No UCI ProTour points awarded (Skil–Shimano) |

=== Summary ===
| | Cyclist | Nation | Team | Points |
|---|---|---|---|---|
| 1 | Iván Gutiérrez | Spain | Caisse d'Epargne | 55 |
| 2 | Sébastien Rosseler | Belgium | Quick-Step | 41 |
| 3 | Michael Rogers | Australia | Team Columbia | 35 |
| 4 | Stijn Devolder | Belgium | Quick-Step | 30 |
| 5 | André Greipel | Germany | Team Columbia | 28 |
| 6 | Joost Posthuma | Netherlands | Rabobank | 20 |
| 7 | Servais Knaven | Netherlands | Team Columbia | 15 |
| 8 | Bram Tankink | Netherlands | Rabobank | 10 |
| 9 | Tom Boonen | Belgium | Quick-Step | 8 |
| 10 | Jürgen Roelandts | Belgium | Silence–Lotto | 6 |
| 11 | Daniele Bennati | Italy | Liquigas | 5 |
| = | Edvald Boasson Hagen | Norway | Team Columbia | 5 |
| 13 | Raivis Belohvoščiks | Latvia | Scott–American Beef | 3 |
| = | Carlo Westphal | Germany | Gerolsteiner | 3 |
| 15 | Jimmy Engoulvent | France | Crédit Agricole | 2 |
| = | Juan José Haedo | Argentina | CSC–Saxo Bank | 2 |
| = | Yauheni Hutarovich | Belarus | Française des Jeux | 2 |
| = | Cyril Lemoine | France | Crédit Agricole | 2 |
| 19 | Robert Förster | Germany | Gerolsteiner | 1 |
| = | Sergei Ivanov | Russia | Astana | 1 |
| = | Fabio Sabatini | Italy | Team Milram | 1 |

== See also ==
- 2008 in road cycling
