= Wolmirstedt (Verwaltungsgemeinschaft) =

Municipality in Saxony-Anhalt, Germany

Coordinates: 52°15′N 11°38′E

Wolmirstedt is a former Verwaltungsgemeinschaft ("collective municipality") in the district of Börde, in Saxony-Anhalt, Germany. The seat of the Verwaltungsgemeinschaft was in Wolmirstedt. It was disbanded in January 2009 with the annexation of Farsleben into Wolmirstedt.

The Verwaltungsgemeinschaft Wolmirstedt consisted of the following municipalities (population in 2006 between brackets):

1. Farsleben (966)
2. Wolmirstedt (10.369)
