= 2004 Vuelta a Castilla y León =

Race details
- Dates: 28 April–2 May 2004
- Stages: 5
- Distance: 625.9 km (388.9 mi)
- Winning time: 16h 03' 05"

Results
	Winner	Koldo Gil (ESP)
	Second	David Navas (ESP)
	Third	Iván Gutiérrez (ESP)

The 2004 Vuelta a Castilla y León was the 19th edition of the Vuelta a Castilla y León cycle race and was held on 28 April to 2 May 2004. The race started in Belorado and finished in Villafranca del Bierzo. The race was won by Koldo Gil.

== Teams ==
Thirteen teams of up to eight riders started the race:

- Illes Balears–Banesto
- Brioches La Boulangère
- Liberty Seguros
- Milaneza–Maia
- Euskaltel–Euskadi
- Relax–Bodysol
- Saunier Duval–Prodir
- Costa de Almería–Paternina
- Lokomotiv
- Comunidad Valenciana–Kelme
- LA Alumínios–Pecol
- Cafés Baqué
- Spanish national team

== General classification ==
Final general classification

Rank	Rider	Time
1	Koldo Gil (ESP)	16h 03' 05"
2	David Navas (ESP)	+ 19"
3	Iván Gutiérrez (ESP)	+ 22"
4	Alejandro Valverde (ESP)	+ 40"
5	Dionisio Galparsoro (ESP)	+ 1' 26"
6	Igor González de Galdeano (ESP)	+ 1' 28"
7	Ángel Vicioso (ESP)	+ 1' 30"
8	Vladimir Karpets (RUS)	+ 1' 51"
9	Jan Hruška (CZE)	+ 2' 08"
10	David Arroyo (ESP)	+ 2' 54"
