= 2005 Clásica de Almería =

Race details
- Dates: 27 February 2005
- Stages: 1
- Distance: 173.4 km (107.7 mi)
- Winning time: 4h 23' 03"

Results
	Winner	Iván Gutiérrez (ESP)
	Second	Sergi Escobar (ESP)
	Third	David Muñoz (ESP)

The 2005 Clásica de Almería was the 20th edition of the Clásica de Almería cycle race and was held on 27 February 2005. The race started in El Ejido and finished in Almería. The race was won by Iván Gutiérrez.

== General classification ==
Final general classification

Rank	Rider	Time
1	Iván Gutiérrez (ESP)	4h 23' 03"
2	Sergi Escobar (ESP)	+ 0"
3	David Muñoz (ESP)	+ 0"
4	José Antonio López (ESP)	+ 4"
5	Marco Milesi (ITA)	+ 55"
6	Dionisio Galparsoro (ESP)	+ 2' 01"
7	Thorwald Veneberg (NED)	+ 2' 03"
8	Steven Kleynen (BEL)	+ 2' 08"
9	Dario Andriotto (ITA)	+ 2' 08"
10	Danilo Hondo (GER)	+ 2' 26"
