= Municipal association (Germany) =

Statutory corporation or public body in some German states

Municipal associations (German: Verwaltungsgemeinschaften, pronounced [fɛɐ̯ˈvaltʊŋsɡəˌmaɪ̯nʃaftn̩], lit. 'administrative communities') are statutory corporations or public bodies created by statute in the German federal states of Bavaria, Saxony, Thuringia, and Schleswig-Holstein. In Baden-Württemberg the term stipulated municipal association (German: vereinbarte Verwaltungsgemeinschaft) is used.

== Structure ==
A municipal association normally consists of several adjacent municipalities located in the same district. It is controlled by a political representative, chairperson or executive board. Depending on the state, this person may be officially retained or appointed as mayor.

- In Baden-Württemberg this position is held by the mayor of the appropriate fulfilling municipality (German: erfüllende Gemeinde).
- In Thuringia there are municipal associations as well as fulfilling municipalities.
- In Bavaria one mayor of a single municipality also acts as municipal chairman (German: Gemeinschaftsvorsitzender) of the association.

== Tasks ==
The duties of a municipal association typically encompass

- Setting up land use plans
- Sewage disposal
- Payment transactions
- Cemetery matters
- Fire brigade provision

== List ==
State	Designation (German)	Category
Baden-Württemberg	vereinbarte Verwaltungsgemeinschaft	
Baden-Württemberg	Gemeindeverwaltungsverband	
Bavaria	Verwaltungsgemeinschaft	Category:Verwaltungsgemeinschaften in Bavaria
Rhineland-Palatinate	Verbandsgemeinde	Category:Verbandsgemeinden in Rhineland-Palatinate
Saxony-Anhalt	Verbandsgemeinde	Category:Verbandsgemeinden in Saxony-Anhalt
Saxony-Anhalt	Verwaltungsgemeinschaft	Category:Verwaltungsgemeinschaften in Saxony-Anhalt
Thuringia	Verwaltungsgemeinschaft	Category:Verwaltungsgemeinschaften in Thuringia

== See also ==
- Amt (country subdivision)
- Municipal associations in Thuringia
- Municipalities of Germany
- Samtgemeinde
- Verbandsgemeinde
- Wolmirstedt
