= 2007 Eneco Tour =

2007 UCI ProTour, race 21 of 26
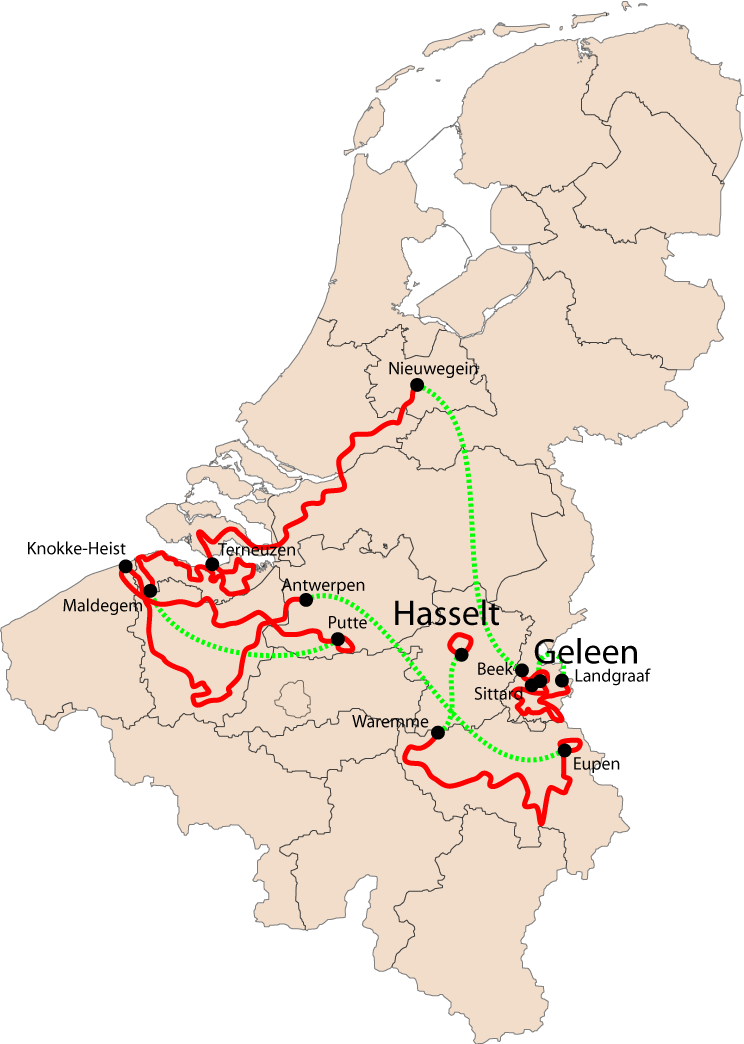
- Overview of the stages

Race details
- Dates: 22 to 29 August 2007
- Stages: 7
- Distance: 1,134.2 km (704.8 mi)
- Winning time: 26h 05' 44"

Results
	Winner	Iván Gutiérrez (ESP)	(Caisse d'Epargne)
	Second	David Millar (GBR)	(Saunier Duval–Prodir)
	Third	Gustav Erik Larsson (SWE)	(Unibet.com Cycling Team)

The 2007 Eneco Tour road cycling race took place from 22 to 29 August. The third edition of the Eneco Tour covered parts of the Netherlands and Belgium. Instead of 23 teams like before, only 21 teams take part in the race this year. Of the 20 UCI ProTour teams, only Astana chose not to take part. The teams Chocolade Jacques–Topsport Vlaanderen and Skil–Shimano were each given a wild card.

Several cities that have been start or finish locations already the previous years appear again in the schedule, e.g. Hasselt, Beek, Landgraaf, Sittard and Geleen were already part of the 2006 route. A major difference in the schedule is that the long time trial will now take place on the last day of the competition.

== Schedule ==
Stage	Route	Distance	Date	Winner
P	Hasselt (Belgium) – Hasselt (Belgium)	5.1 km	Wednesday 22 August	Michiel Elijzen (Netherlands)
1	Waremme (Belgium) – Eupen (Belgium)	189.5 km	Thursday 23 August	Nick Nuyens (Belgium)
2	Antwerp (Belgium) – Knokke-Heist (Belgium)	199.1 km	Friday 24 August	Mark Cavendish (United Kingdom)
3	Knokke-Heist (Belgium) – Putte (Belgium)	170.8 km	Saturday 25 August	Robbie McEwen (Australia)
4	Maldegem (Belgium) – Terneuzen (Netherlands)	182.7 km	Sunday 26 August	Wouter Weylandt (Belgium)
5	Terneuzen (Netherlands) – Nieuwegein (Netherlands)	179.9 km	Monday 27 August	Luciano Pagliarini (Brazil)
6	Beek (Netherlands) – Landgraaf (Netherlands)	177.4 km	Tuesday 28 August	Pablo Lastras (Spain)
7 (ITT)	Sittard (Netherlands) – Geleen (Netherlands)	29.6 km	Wednesday 29 August	Sébastien Rosseler (Belgium)

== Stages ==
=== 22-08-2007: Hasselt, 5.1 km. (ITT) ===
Prologue Result

	Cyclist	Country	Team	Time
1	Michiel Elijzen	Netherlands	Cofidis	6' 09"
2	Juan Antonio Flecha	Spain	Rabobank	+ 1"
3	Johan van Summeren	Belgium	Predictor–Lotto	+ 2"

General classification after the Prologue

	Cyclist	Country	Team	Time
1	Michiel Elijzen	Netherlands	Cofidis	6' 09"
2	Juan Antonio Flecha	Spain	Rabobank	+ 1"
3	Johan van Summeren	Belgium	Predictor–Lotto	+ 2"

=== 23-08-2007: Waremme-Eupen, 189.5 km. ===
Stage 1 result

	Cyclist	Country	Team	Time
1	Nick Nuyens	Belgium	Cofidis	4h 42' 38"
2	Thomas Dekker	Netherlands	Rabobank	s.t.
3	Iván Gutiérrez	Spain	Caisse d'Epargne	s.t.

General classification after Stage 1

	Cyclist	Country	Team	Time
1	Nick Nuyens	Belgium	Cofidis	4h 48' 39"
2	Thomas Dekker	Netherlands	Rabobank	+ 10"
3	Iván Gutiérrez	Spain	Caisse d'Epargne	+ 17"

=== 24-08-2007: Antwerp-Knokke-Heist, 199.1 km. ===
Stage 2 result

	Cyclist	Country	Team	Time
1	Mark Cavendish	United Kingdom	T-Mobile Team	4h 31' 09"
2	Fred Rodriguez	United States	Predictor–Lotto	s.t.
3	Kenny van Hummel	Netherlands	Skil–Shimano	s.t.

General classification after Stage 2

	Cyclist	Country	Team	Time
1	Nick Nuyens	Belgium	Cofidis	9h 19' 48"
2	Thomas Dekker	Netherlands	Rabobank	+ 10"
3	Iván Gutiérrez	Spain	Caisse d'Epargne	+ 17"

- (Belgium) Wouter Weylandt (Quick-Step–Innergetic) finished third but was relegated due to irregular sprint.

=== 25-08-2007: Knokke-Heist-Putte, 170.8 km. ===
Stage 3 result

	Cyclist	Country	Team	Time
1	Robbie McEwen	Australia	Predictor–Lotto	3h 42' 28"
2	Francesco Chicchi	Italy	Liquigas	s.t.
3	Thor Hushovd	Norway	Crédit Agricole	s.t.

General classification after Stage 3

	Cyclist	Country	Team	Time
1	Nick Nuyens	Belgium	Cofidis	13h 02' 16"
2	Thomas Dekker	Netherlands	Rabobank	+ 10"
3	Iván Gutiérrez	Spain	Caisse d'Epargne	+ 17"

=== 26-08-2007: Maldegem-Terneuzen, 182.7 km. ===
Stage 4 result

	Cyclist	Country	Team	Time
1	Wouter Weylandt	Belgium	Quick-Step–Innergetic	4h 09' 31"
2	Thor Hushovd	Norway	Crédit Agricole	s.t.
3	Matthew Goss	Australia	Team CSC	s.t.

General classification after Stage 4

	Cyclist	Country	Team	Time
1	Nick Nuyens	Belgium	Cofidis	17h 11' 47"
2	Thomas Dekker	Netherlands	Rabobank	+ 10"
3	Iván Gutiérrez	Spain	Caisse d'Epargne	+ 14"

=== 27-08-2007: Terneuzen-Nieuwegein, 179.9 km. ===
Stage 5 result

	Cyclist	Country	Team	Time
1	Luciano Pagliarini	Brazil	Saunier Duval–Prodir	4h 01' 10"
2	Mark Cavendish	United Kingdom	T-Mobile Team	s.t.
3	Graeme Brown	Australia	Rabobank	s.t.

General classification after Stage 5

	Cyclist	Country	Team	Time
1	Nick Nuyens	Belgium	Cofidis	21h 12' 57"
2	Thomas Dekker	Netherlands	Rabobank	+ 10"
3	Iván Gutiérrez	Spain	Caisse d'Epargne	+ 14"

=== 28-08-2007: Beek-Landgraaf, 177.4 km. ===
Stage 6 result

	Cyclist	Country	Team	Time
1	Pablo Lastras	Spain	Caisse d'Epargne	4h 15' 28"
2	Steven Caethoven	Belgium	Chocolade Jacques–Topsport Vlaanderen	s.t.
3	Anders Lund	Denmark	Team CSC	s.t.

General classification after Stage 5

	Cyclist	Country	Team	Time
1	Thomas Dekker	Netherlands	Rabobank	25h 28' 48"
2	Iván Gutiérrez	Spain	Caisse d'Epargne	+ 4"
3	David Millar	United Kingdom	Saunier Duval–Prodir	+ 6"

=== 29-08-2007: Sittard-Geleen, 29.6 km. (ITT) ===
Stage 7 result

	Cyclist	Country	Team	Time
1	Sébastien Rosseler	Belgium	Quick-Step–Innergetic	36' 50"
2	Iván Gutiérrez	Spain	Caisse d'Epargne	+ 2"
3	Gustav Larsson	Sweden	Unibet.com Cycling Team	+ 6"

General classification after Stage 7

	Cyclist	Country	Team	Time
1	Iván Gutiérrez	Spain	Caisse d'Epargne	26h 05' 44"
2	David Millar	United Kingdom	Saunier Duval–Prodir	+ 11"
3	Gustav Larsson	Sweden	Unibet.com Cycling Team	+ 1'05"

== General classification ==
The leader of the general classification (ENECO Energie leiderstrui) wears a red jersey.

	Cyclist	Nation	Team	Time
1	Iván Gutiérrez	Spain	Caisse d'Epargne	26h 05' 44"
2	David Millar	United Kingdom	Saunier Duval–Prodir	+ 11"
3	Gustav Larsson	Sweden	Unibet.com Cycling Team	+ 1' 05"
4	Leif Hoste	Belgium	Predictor–Lotto	+ 1' 12"
5	Thomas Dekker	Netherlands	Rabobank	+ 1' 15"
6	Vladimir Gusev	Russia	Discovery Channel	+ 1' 17"
7	Bram Tankink	Netherlands	Quick-Step–Innergetic	+ 1' 32"
8	Sébastien Rosseler	Belgium	Quick-Step–Innergetic	+ 1' 33"
9	Paul Martens	Germany	Skil–Shimano	+ 1' 34"
10	Jurgen Van den Broeck	Belgium	Predictor–Lotto	+ 1' 34"
11	Juan Antonio Flecha	Spain	Rabobank	+ 1' 46"
12	Piet Rooijakkers	Netherlands	Skil–Shimano	+ 1' 47"
13	Sebastian Lang	Germany	Gerolsteiner	+ 1' 48"
14	Andriy Hryvko	Ukraine	Team Milram	+ 1' 50"
15	Vincenzo Nibali	Italy	Liquigas	+ 1' 56"
16	Maarten Tjallingii	Netherlands	Skil–Shimano	+ 1' 56"
17	Rubens Bertogliati	Switzerland	Saunier Duval–Prodir	+ 1' 59"
18	Alberto Losado	Spain	Caisse d'Epargne	+ 2' 12"
19	Mikel Astarloza	Spain	Euskaltel–Euskadi	+ 2' 16"
20	Thor Hushovd	Norway	Crédit Agricole	+ 2' 23"

Last updated: August 29, 2007

== Points Classification ==
The leader of the points classification (Lotto Puntenklassement) wears a white jersey.

	Cyclist	Nation	Team	Points
1	Mark Cavendish	United Kingdom	T-Mobile Team	74
2	Luciano Pagliarini	Brazil	Saunier Duval–Prodir	60
3	Pablo Lastras	Spain	Caisse d'Epargne	51
4	Steven de Jongh	Netherlands	Quick-Step–Innergetic	51
5	Gorik Gardeyn	Belgium	Unibet.com Cycling Team	49
6	Thor Hushovd	Norway	Crédit Agricole	47
7	Steven Caethoven	Belgium	Chocolade Jacques–Topsport Vlaanderen	43
8	Iván Gutiérrez	Spain	Caisse d'Epargne	43
9	Wouter Weylandt	Belgium	Quick-Step–Innergetic	40
10	Kenny van Hummel	Netherlands	Skil–Shimano	39

Last updated: August 27, 2007

== Best Team ==
	Team	Country	Time
1	Quick-Step–Innergetic	Belgium	78h 21' 52"
2	Predictor–Lotto	Belgium	+ 18"
3	Rabobank	Netherlands	+ 27"

== Jersey progress ==
Stage	Winner	General classification	Points Classification	Team Classification
P	Michiel Elijzen	Michiel Elijzen	not awarded	Cofidis
1	Nick Nuyens	Nick Nuyens	Nick Nuyens	Predictor–Lotto
2	Mark Cavendish	Nick Nuyens	Nick Nuyens	Predictor–Lotto
3	Robbie McEwen	Nick Nuyens	Mark Cavendish	Predictor–Lotto
4	Wouter Weylandt	Nick Nuyens	Mark Cavendish	Predictor–Lotto
5	Luciano Pagliarini	Nick Nuyens	Mark Cavendish	Predictor–Lotto
6	Pablo Lastras	Thomas Dekker	Mark Cavendish	Predictor–Lotto
7	Sébastien Rosseler	Iván Gutiérrez	Mark Cavendish	Quick-Step–Innergetic
Final		Iván Gutiérrez	Mark Cavendish	Quick-Step–Innergetic

== Withdrawals ==
All teams were allowed to start with 8 riders. For 21 teams this would create a starting field of 168 riders. Just like previous years however, some teams chose to start with only 7 riders, namely Française des Jeux, Lampre–Fondital, Crédit Agricole and AG2R Prévoyance. As a result, only 164 riders were on the official starting list.

	Stage	Rider	Team	Reason
DNS	1	(Belgium) Christophe Detilloux	Française des Jeux	Crash during prologue
DNF	1	(France) Julien Loubet	AG2R Prévoyance	Unknown
DNF	2	(Italy) Oscar Gatto	Gerolsteiner	Unknown
DNF	2	(France) Laurent Mangel	AG2R Prévoyance	Unknown
DNS	3	(New Zealand) Julian Dean	Crédit Agricole	Unknown
DNF	3	(Denmark) Jakob Piil	T-Mobile Team	Unknown
DNS	4	(Australia) Scott Davis	T-Mobile Team	Unknown
DNS	4	(Australia) Adam Hansen	T-Mobile Team	Unknown
DNS	4	(France) William Bonnet	Crédit Agricole	Unknown
DNS	5	(Italy) Francesco Chicchi	Liquigas	Unknown
DNS	5	(Italy) Roberto Petito	Liquigas	Unknown
DNS	5	(Italy) Alessandro Vanotti	Liquigas	Unknown
DNS	5	(Italy) Enrico Franzoi	Lampre–Fondital	Unknown
DNS	5	(Slovenia) Matej Jurčo	Team Milram	Unknown
DNF	5	(France) Mikaël Cherel	Française des Jeux	Crash during stage 4

== UCI ProTour Points ==
The Eneco Tour 2007 is part of the UCI ProTour and so the riders can earn UCI ProTour Points. Below is states which riders won points and where. Because the Eneco Tour 2006 is a smaller stage race the points given are 3, 2 and 1 for the first three in each stage result. At the end of the tour, the top 10 in the standings receive points accorded as follows: 50, 40, 35, 30, 25, 20, 15, 10, 5 and 2.

=== Stage Results ===
Stage	Route	First (3 Points)	Second (2 Points)	Third (1 Points)
P	Hasselt (Belgium) – Hasselt (Belgium)	Michiel Elijzen (Netherlands)	Juan Antonio Flecha (Spain)	Johan Van Summeren (Belgium)
1	Waremme (Belgium) – Eupen (Belgium)	Nick Nuyens (Belgium)	Thomas Dekker (Netherlands)	Iván Gutiérrez (Spain)
2	Antwerp (Belgium) – Knokke-Heist (Belgium)	Mark Cavendish (United Kingdom)	Fred Rodriguez (United States)	No UCI ProTour points awarded for Kenny van Hummel (Netherlands) (Skil–Shimano)
3	Knokke-Heist (Belgium) – Putte (Belgium)	Robbie McEwen (Australia)	Francesco Chicchi (Italy)	Thor Hushovd (Norway)
4	Maldegem (Belgium) – Terneuzen (Netherlands)	Wouter Weylandt (Belgium)	Thor Hushovd (Norway)	Matthew Goss (Australia)
5	Terneuzen (Netherlands) – Nieuwegein (Netherlands)	Luciano Pagliarini (Brazil)	Mark Cavendish (United Kingdom)	Graeme Brown (Australia)
6	Beek (Netherlands) – Landgraaf (Netherlands)	Pablo Lastras (Spain)	No UCI ProTour points awarded for Steven Caethoven (Belgium) (Chocolade Jacques–Topsport Vlaanderen)	Anders Lund (Denmark)
7 (ITT)	Sittard (Netherlands) – Geleen (Netherlands)	Sébastien Rosseler (Belgium)	Iván Gutiérrez (Spain)	Gustav Larsson (Sweden)

=== Overall result ===
	Cyclist	Points
1	Iván Gutiérrez (Spain)	50
2	David Millar (United Kingdom)	40
3	Gustav Larsson (Sweden)	35
4	Leif Hoste (Belgium)	30
5	Thomas Dekker (Netherlands)	25
6	Vladimir Gusev (Russia)	20
7	Bram Tankink (Netherlands)	15
8	Sébastien Rosseler (Belgium)	10
9	Paul Martens (Germany)	No UCI ProTour points awarded (Skil–Shimano)
10	Jurgen Van den Broeck (Belgium)	2

=== Summary ===
	Cyclist	Nation	Team	Points
1	Iván Gutiérrez	Spain	Caisse d'Epargne	53
2	David Millar	United Kingdom	Saunier Duval–Prodir	40
3	Gustav Larsson	Sweden	Unibet	36
4	Leif Hoste	Belgium	Predictor–Lotto	30
5	Thomas Dekker	Netherlands	Rabobank	27
6	Vladimir Gusev	Russia	Discovery Channel	20
7	Bram Tankink	Netherlands	Quick-Step–Innergetic	15
8	Sébastien Rosseler	Belgium	Quick-Step–Innergetic	13
9	Mark Cavendish	United Kingdom	T-Mobile Team	5
=10	Michiel Elijzen	Netherlands	Cofidis	3
=10	Thor Hushovd	Norway	Crédit Agricole	3
=10	Pablo Lastras	Spain	Caisse d'Epargne	3
=10	Robbie McEwen	Australia	Predictor–Lotto	3
=10	Nick Nuyens	Belgium	Cofidis	3
=10	Luciano Pagliarini	Brazil	Saunier Duval–Prodir	3
=10	Wouter Weylandt	Belgium	Quick-Step–Innergetic	3
=17	Francesco Chicchi	Italy	Liquigas	2
=17	Juan Antonio Flecha	Spain	Rabobank	2
=17	Fred Rodriguez	United States	Predictor–Lotto	2
=17	Jurgen Van den Broeck	Belgium	Predictor–Lotto	2
=21	Graeme Brown	Australia	Rabobank	1
=21	Matthew Goss	Australia	Team CSC	1
=21	Anders Lund	Denmark	Team CSC	1
=21	Johan Van Summeren	Belgium	Predictor–Lotto	1
