= Thorwald Veneberg =

Dutch road bicycle racer

Personal information
- Full name: Thorwald Veneberg
- Born: 16 October 1977 (age 48) Amsterdam, the Netherlands
- Height: 1.86 m (6 ft 1 in)
- Weight: 76 kg (168 lb)

Cycling career
- Sport: Cycling
- Discipline: Road
- Role: Rider

Professional team
- 2001–2007: Rabobank

Major wins
- Scheldeprijs (2005)

Thorwald Veneberg (born 16 October 1977, in Amsterdam) is a Dutch former professional road bicycle racer. He rode for UCI ProTeam Rabobank between 2001 and 2007.

== Major results ==
1998
Tour de Normandie

1st Stages 3 & 7

1999
1st Stage 3 Circuito Montañés
3rd Road race, National Under–23 Road Championships
6th Hel van Het Mergelland
2000
4th Overall Circuit de Lorraine

1st Stage 3

2002
1st Mountains Classification Sachsen Tour
2004
1st Noord-Nederland Tour
2005
1st Scheldeprijs
7th Clásica de Almería
