= 2005 Scheldeprijs =

Race details
- Dates: 13 April 2005
- Stages: 1
- Distance: 202 km (125.5 mi)
- Winning time: 4h 30' 00"

Results
	Winner	Thorwald Veneberg (NED)
	Second	Tomas Vaitkus (LTU)
	Third	Simone Cadamuro (ITA)

The 2005 Scheldeprijs was the 92nd edition of the Scheldeprijs cycle race and was held on 13 April 2005. The race was won by Thorwald Veneberg.

== General classification ==
Final general classification

Rank	Rider	Time
1	Thorwald Veneberg (NED)	4h 30' 00"
2	Tomas Vaitkus (LTU)	+ 0"
3	Simone Cadamuro (ITA)	+ 4' 39"
4	Tom Boonen (BEL)	+ 4' 41"
5	Niko Eeckhout (BEL)	+ 4' 47"
6	Steffen Radochla (GER)	+ 4' 47"
7	Henk Vogels (AUS)	+ 4' 47"
8	Jurgen Van Loocke (BEL)	+ 4' 47"
9	Jukka Vastaranta (FIN)	+ 4' 54"
10	Jarosław Zarębski (POL)	+ 4' 54"
