= 2004 Vuelta a Murcia =

Race details
- Dates: 3–7 March 2004
- Stages: 5
- Distance: 656.7 km (408.1 mi)
- Winning time: 15h 49' 31"

Results
| | Winner | Alejandro Valverde (ESP) |
| | Second | Iván Gutiérrez (ESP) |
| | Third | Cadel Evans (AUS) |

The 2004 Vuelta a Murcia was the 20th professional edition of the Vuelta a Murcia cycle race and was held on 3 March to 7 March 2004. The race started and finished in Murcia. The race was won by Alejandro Valverde.

== General classification ==
Final general classification

| Rank | Rider | Time |
|---|---|---|
| 1 | Alejandro Valverde (ESP) | 15h 49' 31" |
| 2 | Iván Gutiérrez (ESP) | + 5" |
| 3 | Cadel Evans (AUS) | + 9" |
| 4 | Rubén Plaza (ESP) | + 20" |
| 5 | Evgeni Petrov (RUS) | + 37" |
| 6 | Antonio Colom (ESP) | + 1' 10" |
| 7 | David Cañada (ESP) | + 1' 13" |
| 8 | José Miguel Galindo (ESP) | + 1' 40" |
| 9 | Miguel Ángel Perdiguero (ESP) | + 1' 41" |
| 10 | Javier Ramírez (ESP) | + 1' 44" |
