= Glindenberg =

- Stadtteil of Wolmirstedt
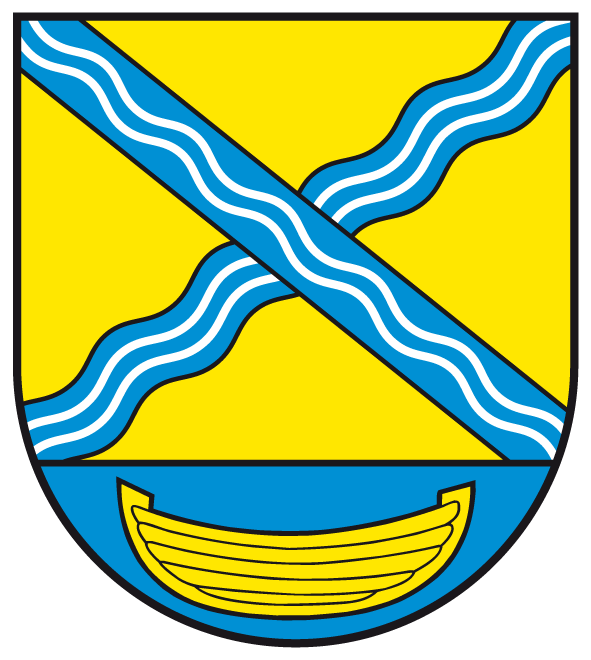
- Coat of arms
- Interactive map of Glindenberg
- Location within Germany Location within Saxony-Anhalt
- Coordinates: 52°14′8″N 11°41′0″E
- Country: Germany
- State: Saxony-Anhalt
- District: Börde
- Town: Wolmirstedt

Area
  - Total: 15.41 km^{2} (5.95 sq mi)
- Elevation: 39 m (128 ft)

Population (2006-12-31)
  - Total: 1,346
  - Density: 87.35/km^{2} (226.2/sq mi)
- Time zone: UTC+01:00 (CET)
  - Summer (DST): UTC+02:00 (CEST)
- Postal codes: 39326
- Dialling codes: 039201
- Vehicle registration: BK
- Website: www.gemeinde-glindenberg.de

Glindenberg is a village and a former municipality in the Börde district in Saxony-Anhalt, Germany. Since 1 July 2009, it is part of the town Wolmirstedt.
