= Iván Gutiérrez (cyclist) =

Spanish cyclist

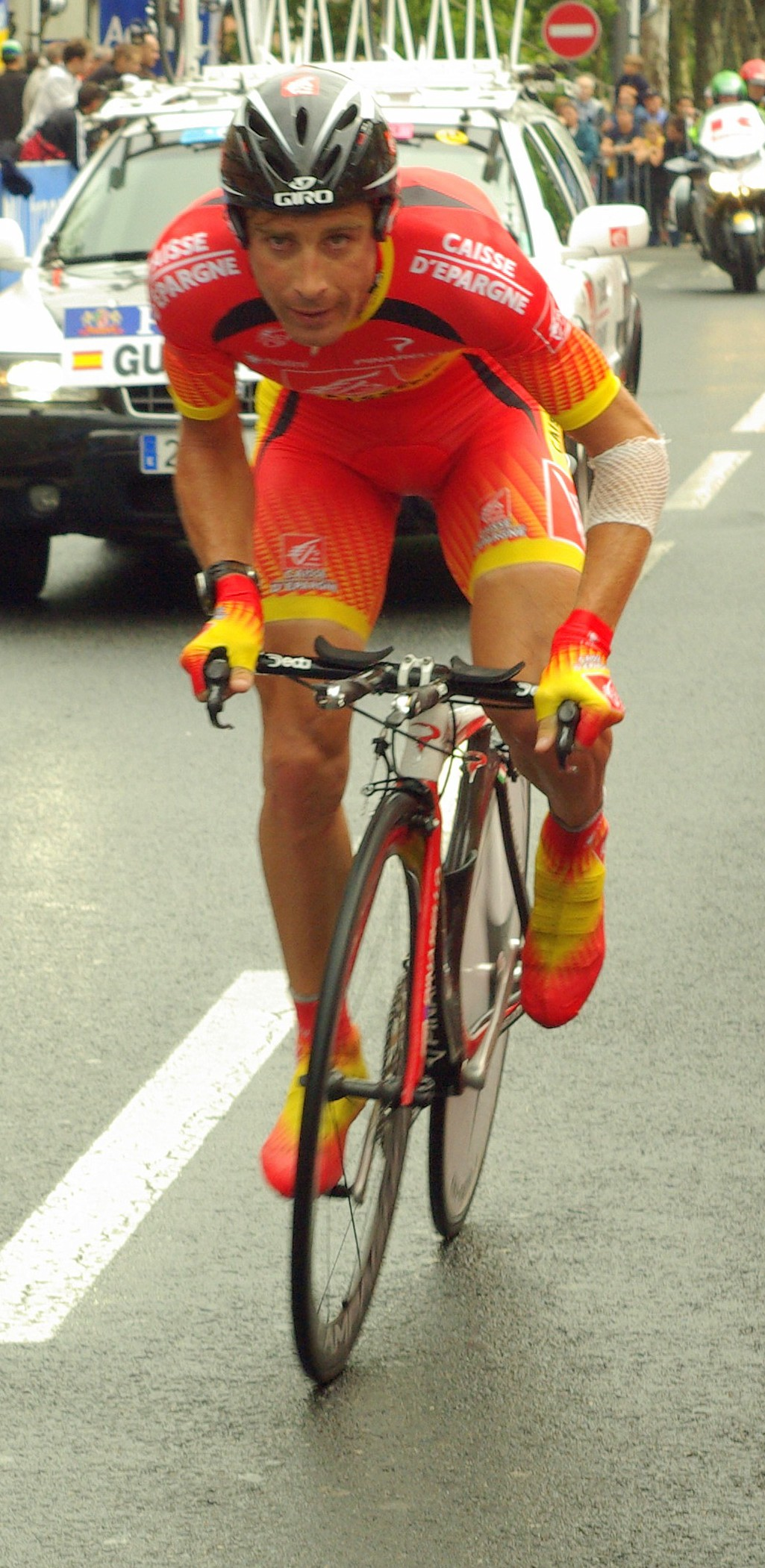
- Gutiérrez at the 2007 Tour de France

Personal information
- Full name: José Iván Gutiérrez Palacios
- Born: 27 November 1978 (age 47) Hinojedo, Suances, Cantabria, Spain
- Height: 1.81 m (5 ft 11 in)
- Weight: 77 kg (170 lb)

Cycling career
- Sport: Cycling
- Current team: Retired
- Discipline: Road
- Role: Rider
- Rider type: Time-trial specialist

Amateur team
- 1999: ONCE–Deutsche Bank (stagiaire)

Professional teams
- 2000–2001: ONCE–Deutsche Bank
- 2002–2014: iBanesto.com

Major wins
- Stage races Eneco Tour (2007, 2008) Single-day races and Classics National Time Trial Championships (2000, 2004, 2005, 2007) National Road Race Championships (2001, 2010) Giro dell'Emilia (2003)
Medal record
Representing Spain
Men's road bicycle racing
UCI World Championships
| Silver medal – second place | 2005 Madrid | Time trial |
UCI Under-23 World Championships
| Gold medal – first place | 1999 Verona | Time trial |

José Iván Gutiérrez Palacios (born 27 November 1978 in Hinojedo, Suances, Cantabria) is a Spanish former professional road bicycle racer. He was a two-time Spanish national road race champion, three time Spanish time trial champion and won a silver medal in the 2005 Time Trial World Championships. He also won two consecutive editions of the Eneco Tour, in 2007 and 2008. He retired in 2014 with UCI ProTeam Movistar Team, the team he rode the vast majority of his career for.

== Major results ==
1999
1st Time trial, UCI Road World Under–23 Championships
2000
1st Time trial, National Road Championships
2001
1st Road race, National Road Championships
1st G.P. CTT Correios
2002
1st GP Llodio
1st Stage 2 Vuelta a Burgos
2003
1st Giro Dell'Emilia
1st Escalada a Montjuïc
2004
1st Time trial, National Road Championships
1st Stage 1 Vuelta a Castilla y León
2nd Overall Vuelta a Murcia

1st Points classification
1st Stage 2 (ITT)

2005
1st Time trial, National Road Championships
1st Mountains classification Critérium du Dauphiné Libéré
1st Clásica de Almería
2nd Time trial, UCI Road World Championships
2006
1st Overall Vuelta a Murcia

1st Stage 3 (ITT)

Vuelta a Burgos

1st Stages 3 (ITT) & 5

4th Overall Tour Méditerranéen

1st Points classification
1st Stage 2

4th Overall Critérium International
2007
1st Time trial, National Road Championships
1st Overall Tour Méditerranéen

1st Stage 1

1st Overall Eneco Tour of Benelux
7th Time trial, UCI Road World Championships
2008
1st Overall Eneco Tour of Benelux

1st Prologue

4th Overall Volta a la Comunitat Valenciana

1st Stage 1

Combativity award Stage 14 Tour de France
2009
1st Stage 2 (TTT) Tour Méditerranéen
5th Time trial, National Road Championships
2010
National Road Championships

1st Road race
2nd Time trial

3rd Trofeo Deia
6th Overall Vuelta a Burgos
6th Trofeo Inca
2011
3rd Time trial, National Road Championships
7th Vuelta a La Rioja
2012
5th Time trial, National Road Championships

=== Grand Tour general classification results timeline ===
| Grand Tour | 2000 | 2001 | 2002 | 2003 | 2004 | 2005 | 2006 | 2007 | 2008 | 2009 | 2010 | 2011 | 2012 | 2013 |
|---|---|---|---|---|---|---|---|---|---|---|---|---|---|---|
| Giro d'Italia | — | — | — | — | — | — | 24 | — | — | — | — | — | — | — |
| Tour de France | DNF | 64 | — | — | 51 | — | — | 22 | 56 | 71 | 48 | 101 | DNF | DNF |
| Vuelta a España | — | — | 100 | — | — | DNF | — | — | — | — | — | — | — | 119 |

Legend
| — | Did not compete |
| DNF | Did not finish |

Sporting positions
| Preceded by Santos González | Spanish National Time Trial Champion; 2000 | Succeeded by Santos González |
| Preceded by Iñigo Chaurreau | Spanish National Time Trial Champion; 2004, 2005 | Succeeded by Toni Tauler |
| Preceded by Toni Tauler | Spanish National Time Trial Champion; 2007 | Succeeded by Luis León Sánchez |
| Preceded by Álvaro González de Galdeano | Spanish National Road Race Champion; 2001 | Succeeded by Juan Carlos Guillamón |
| Preceded by Rubén Plaza | Spanish National Road Race Champion; 2010 | Succeeded by José Joaquín Rojas |
