= Michiel Elijzen =

Dutch road racing cyclist (born 1982)

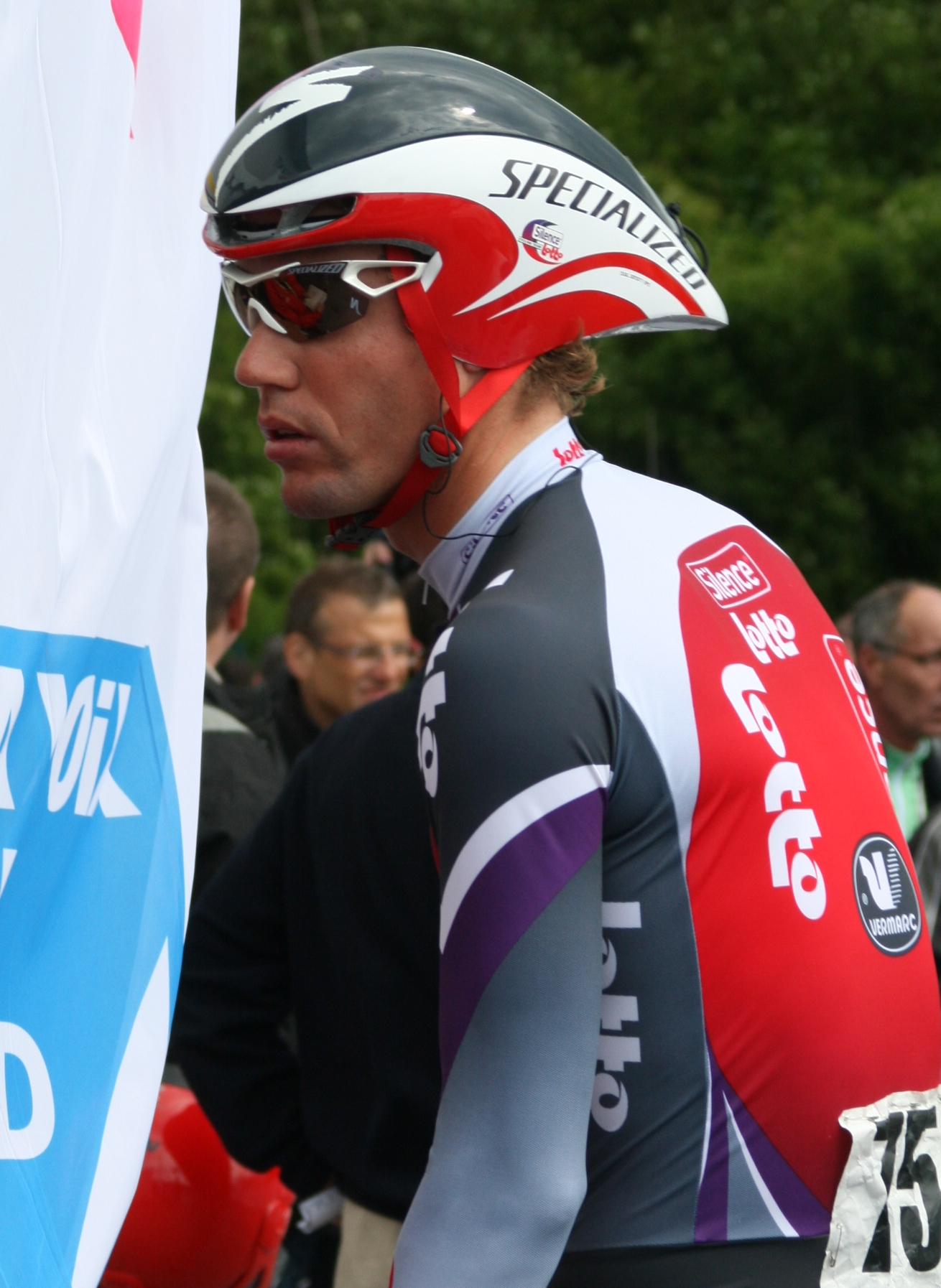

Personal information
- Full name: Michiel Elijzen
- Born: 31 August 1982 (age 44) Culemborg, the Netherlands

Cycling career
- Sport: Cycling
- Current team: Team Picnic–PostNL (men); Team Picnic–PostNL (women); Development Team Picnic–PostNL
- Discipline: Road
- Role: Rider (retired); Directeur sportif

Professional teams
- 2002–2005: Rabobank GS3
- 2006–2007: Cofidis
- 2008: Rabobank
- 2009–2010: Silence–Lotto

Managerial teams
- 2011–2012: Omega Pharma–Lotto
- 2013–2014: Blanco Pro Cycling
- 2015–2016: SEG Racing
- 2017–2018: Vérandas Willems–Crelan
- 2019–: Team Sunweb (men)
- 2019–: Team Sunweb (women)
- 2019–: Development Team Sunweb

Michiel Elijzen (born 31 August 1982 in Culemborg, Gelderland) is a Dutch former professional road bicycle racer, who retired from competition after the 2010 season to become a sporting director for Omega Pharma–Lotto, the team for which he last rode competitively. He now works as a directeur sportif for the Sunweb Group B.V. teams: UCI WorldTeam Team Picnic–PostNL, UCI Women's WorldTeam Team Picnic–PostNL, and UCI Continental team Development Team Picnic–PostNL.

Subsequently, he served as a sporting manager for Blanco Pro Cycling and Belkin Pro Cycling before joining the new SEG Racing team in 2015.

== Major results ==
2005
3rd Time trial, National Road Championships
2007
1st Duo Normand (with Bradley Wiggins)
1st Prologue Eneco Tour
2nd Time trial, National Road Championships
