= David Navas =

Spanish cyclist

Personal information
- Full name: David Navas Chica
- Born: 10 June 1974 (age 52) Ávila, Spain
- Height: 1.88 m (6 ft 2 in)
- Weight: 78 kg (172 lb)

Cycling career
- Sport: Cycling
- Discipline: Road
- Role: Rider

Professional teams
- 1998–2002: Banesto
- 2003: Relax-Fuenlabrada
- 2004–2005: Illes Balears
- 2006–2007: AG2R Prévoyance

David Navas Chica (born 10 June 1974 in Ávila) is a Spanish professional road bicycle racer active professionally from 1996-2007.

== Prize List ==
- Volta ao Minho - 1 stage (2000)
