= Farsleben =

- Stadtteil of Wolmirstedt
- Coat of arms
- Interactive map of Farsleben
- Location within Germany Location within Saxony-Anhalt
- Coordinates: 52°16′N 11°39′E
- Country: Germany
- State: Saxony-Anhalt
- District: Börde
- Town: Wolmirstedt

Area
  - Total: 7.12 km^{2} (2.75 sq mi)
- Elevation: 50 m (160 ft)

Population (2006-12-31)
  - Total: 967
  - Density: 136/km^{2} (352/sq mi)
- Time zone: UTC+01:00 (CET)
  - Summer (DST): UTC+02:00 (CEST)
- Postal codes: 39326
- Dialling codes: 039201
- Vehicle registration: BK
- Website: www.farsleben.de

Farsleben is a village and a former municipality in the Börde district in Saxony-Anhalt, Germany. Since 1 January 2009, it is part of the town Wolmirstedt.
