= Carlo Westphal =

German professional road bicycle racer (born 1985)

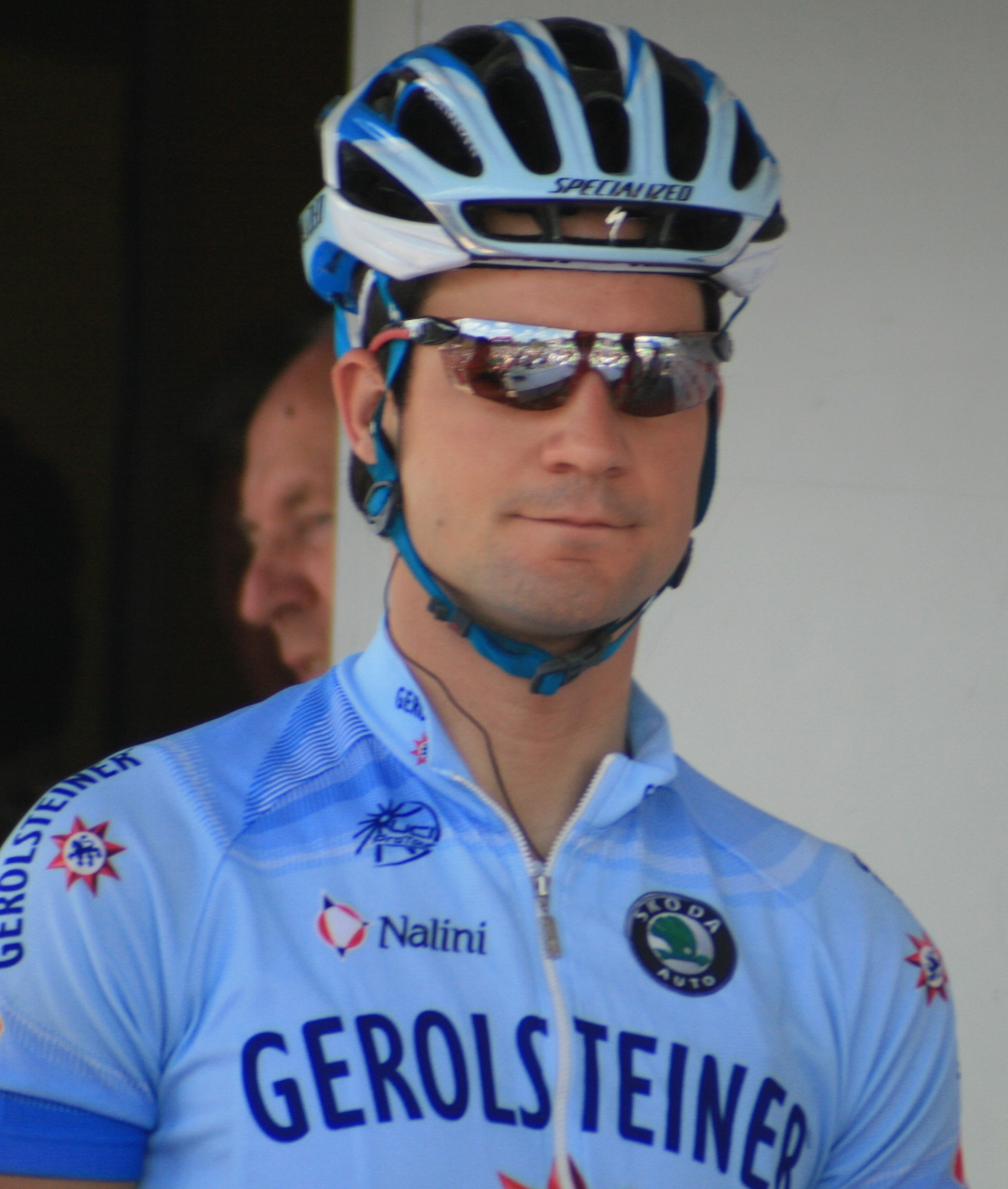

Personal information
- Full name: Carlo Westphal
- Born: November 25, 1985 (age 40) Wolmirstedt, East Germany
- Height: 1.81 m (5 ft 11 in)
- Weight: 73 kg (161 lb)

Cycling career
- Sport: Cycling
- Current team: none
- Discipline: Road
- Role: Rider

Professional teams
- 2005: Sparkasse
- 2006: Wiesenhof-Akud
- 2007–2008: Gerolsteiner

Carlo Westphal (born November 25, 1985, in Wolmirstedt) is a German professional road bicycle racer, currently unattached following the collapse of Team Gerolsteiner.

== Palmares ==
- Thüringen Rundfahrt - 1 stage (2004)
- 3rd, National U23 Road Race Championship (2004)
- Niedersachsen-Rundfahrt - U19 version (2003)
- Eneco Tour - 5th stage (2008)
