= Wolmirstedt =

Town in Börde district, Saxony-Anhalt, Germany

- Town
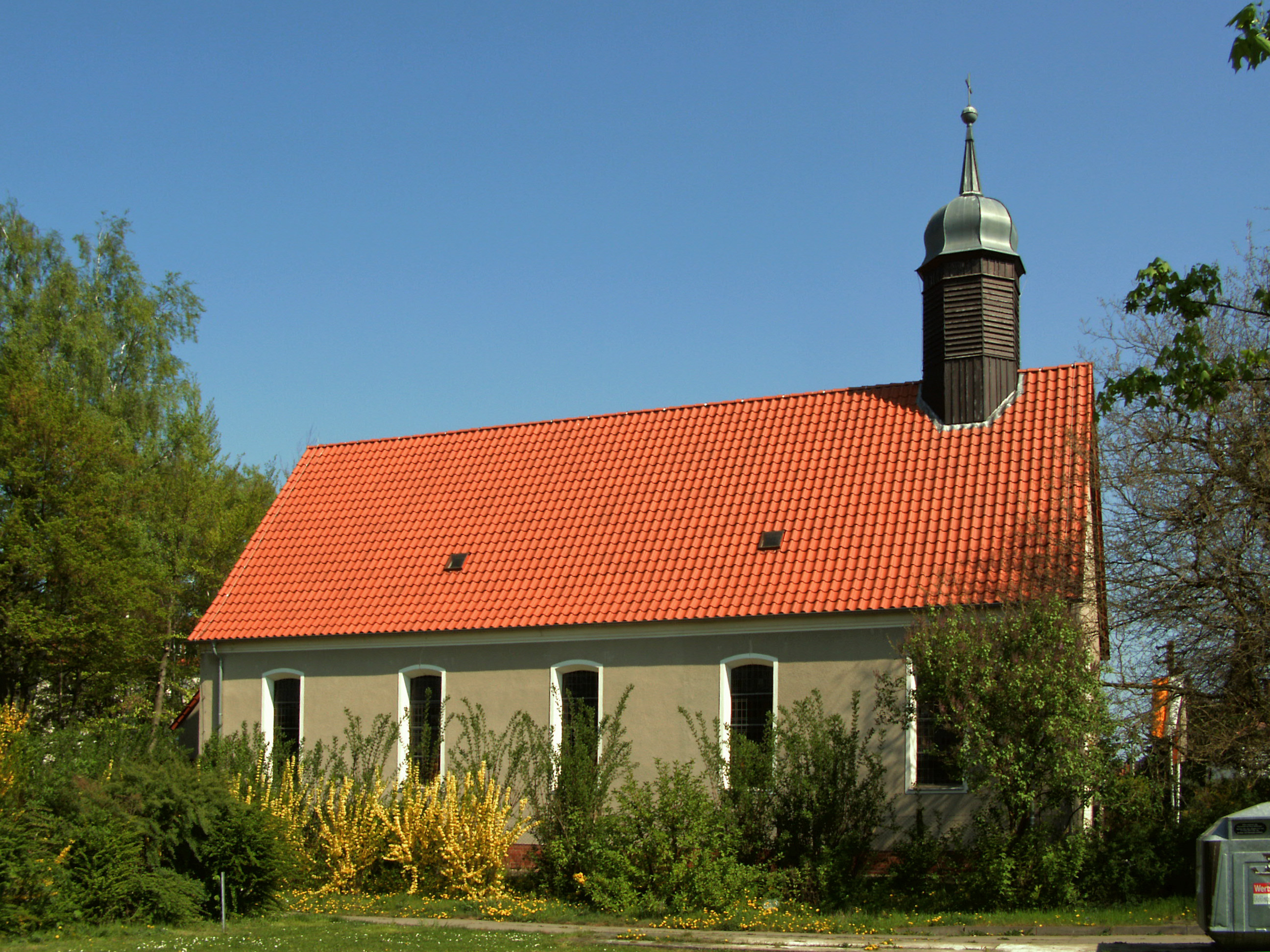
- Saint Joseph Church

- Coat of arms

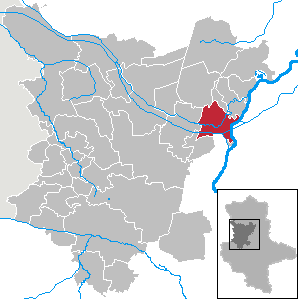
- Location of Wolmirstedt within Börde district
- Interactive map of Wolmirstedt
- Location within Germany Location within Saxony-Anhalt
- Coordinates: 52°15′7″N 11°37′47″E
- Country: Germany
- State: Saxony-Anhalt
- District: Börde
- Subdivisions: 3

Government
  - Mayor (2018–25): Marlies Cassuhn (Ind.)

Area
  - Total: 54.27 km^{2} (20.95 sq mi)
- Elevation: 126 m (413 ft)

Population (2025-12-31)
  - Total: 12,390
  - Density: 228.3/km^{2} (591.3/sq mi)
- Time zone: UTC+01:00 (CET)
  - Summer (DST): UTC+02:00 (CEST)
- Postal codes: 39326
- Dialling codes: 039201
- Vehicle registration: BK, BÖ, HDL, OC, OK, WMS, WZL
- Website: www.stadtwolmirstedt.de

Wolmirstedt (German pronunciation: [ˈvɔlmɪʁˌʃtɛt]) is a town in the Börde district in Saxony-Anhalt, Germany. It is located 14 km north of Magdeburg, on the river Ohre. The town consists of Wolmirstedt proper and the Ortschaften (municipal divisions) Elbeu, Farsleben, Glindenberg, and Mose.

== History ==
- 1300–750 BC: Late Bronze Age settlement that included a weaving house.
- 1009: First mentioned in 1009 in the chronicle of Thietmar of Merseburg.
- 1274: Ruthger von Blumenthal appointed Vogt of Wolmirstedt.
- 1348: Charles IV, Holy Roman Emperor stays in town; issues decree releasing the burghers of Pritzwalk, Havelberg, Perleberg, and Kyritz from their feudal duty to Louis IV, Holy Roman Emperor.
- 1475: The men of the robber baron Dietrich von Quitzow raid the town.
- 1480: Castle chapel completed in 1480 under Archbishop Ernst II of Saxony.
- 1590: Municipal law established.
- Thirty Years' War: heavy destruction.

Wolmirstedt was the district town of the Wolmirstedt District until 1994, when the districts Haldensleben and Wolmirstedt were merged to form the Ohrekreis, with the seat of administration in Haldensleben. In 2007, the Ohrekreis was merged with the Bördekreis district to form the Börde district.

== Sights ==
- Historical town centre
- Castle and historical castle church (northern brick Gothic)
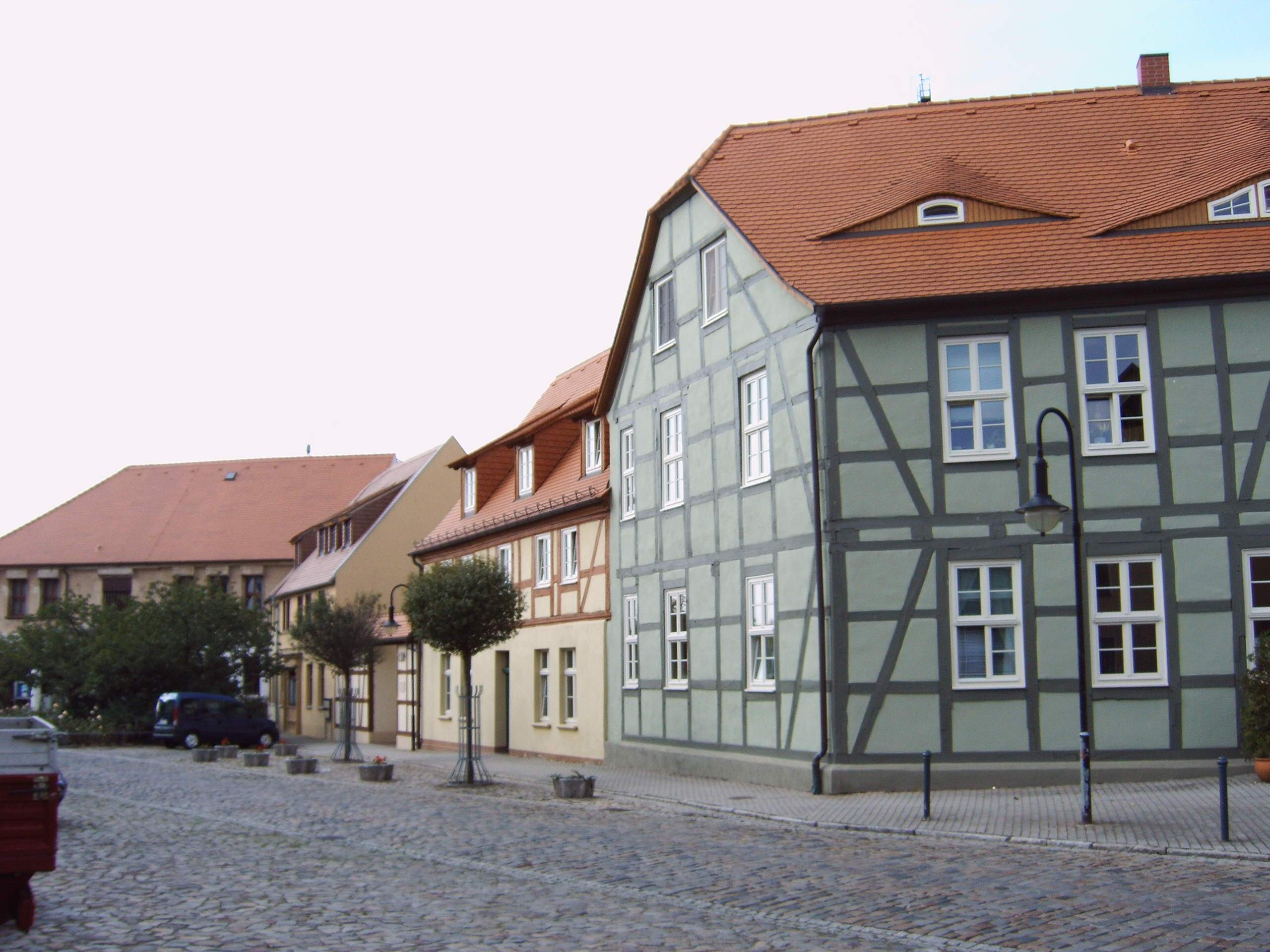
Wolmirstedt

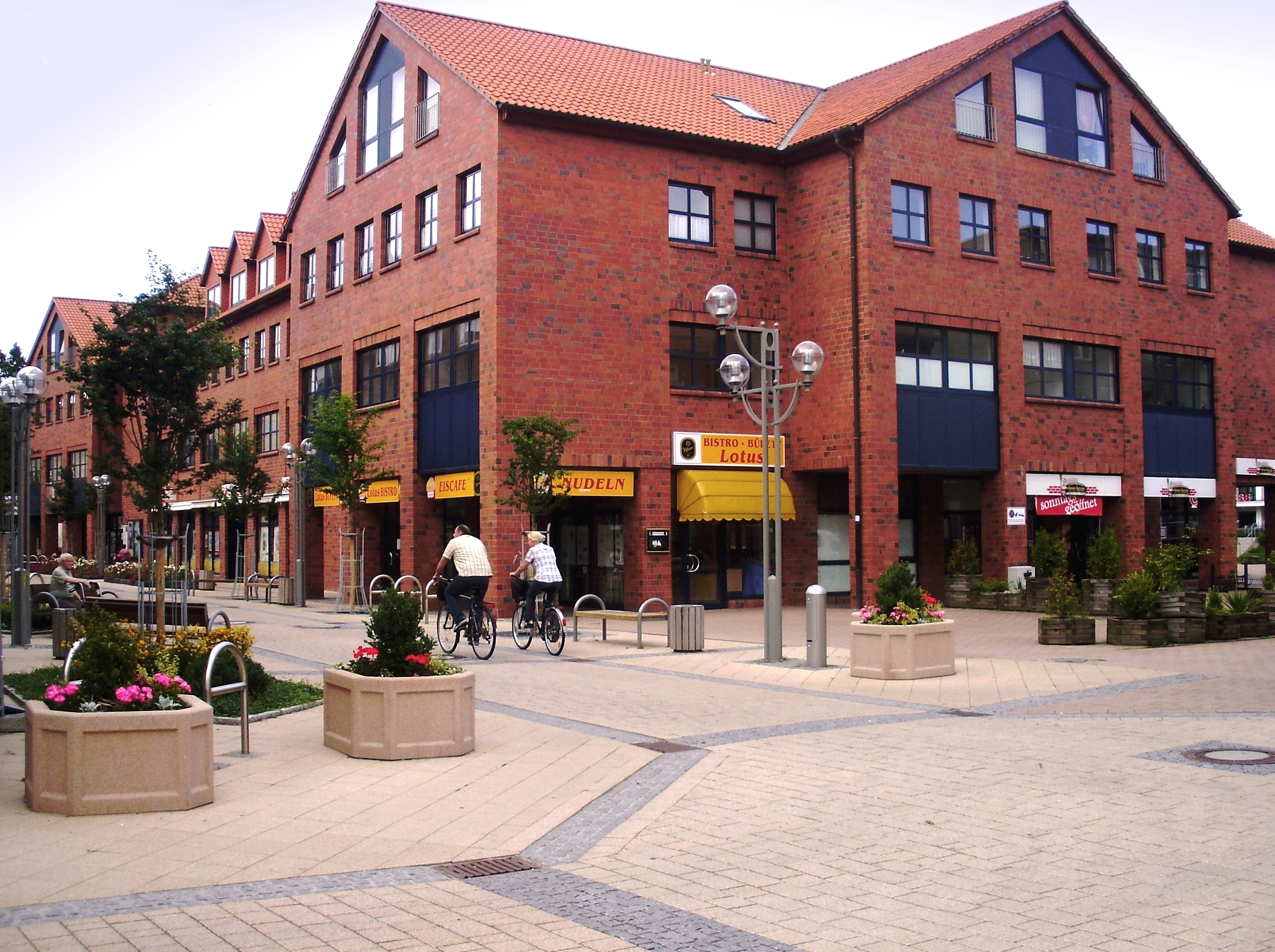
Wolmirstedt

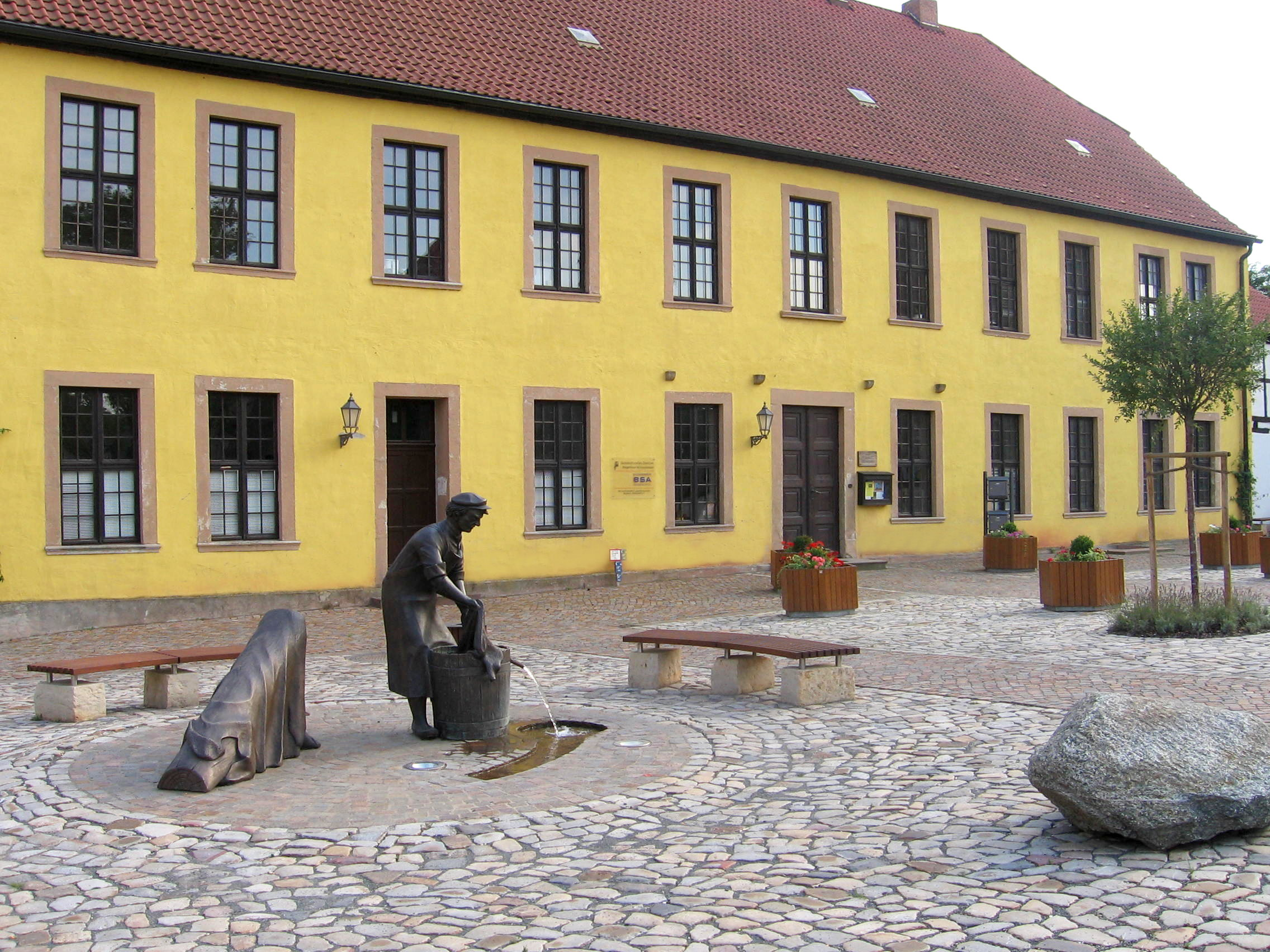
Bürgerhaus, Schloßdomäne

== Infrastructure ==
In Wolmirstedt there is a large substation for 380kV. On the area of this transformer an HVDC back-to-back station with a transmission rate of 600 megawatts was planned, but this plan was canceled after the German reunification in 1990, because it was decided to synchronize electricity mains of East and West Germany. The 380kV line running from the transformer station Wolmirstedt to the shut-down nuclear power station Lubmin is the longest power line in Germany.

== Transport ==
- Near Wolmirstedt the Mittellandkanal traverses the Elbe.
- The city can be reached by means of the exit Magdeburg-center of the federal motorway A 2 as well as the federal highway 189.

== Sons and daughters of the city ==
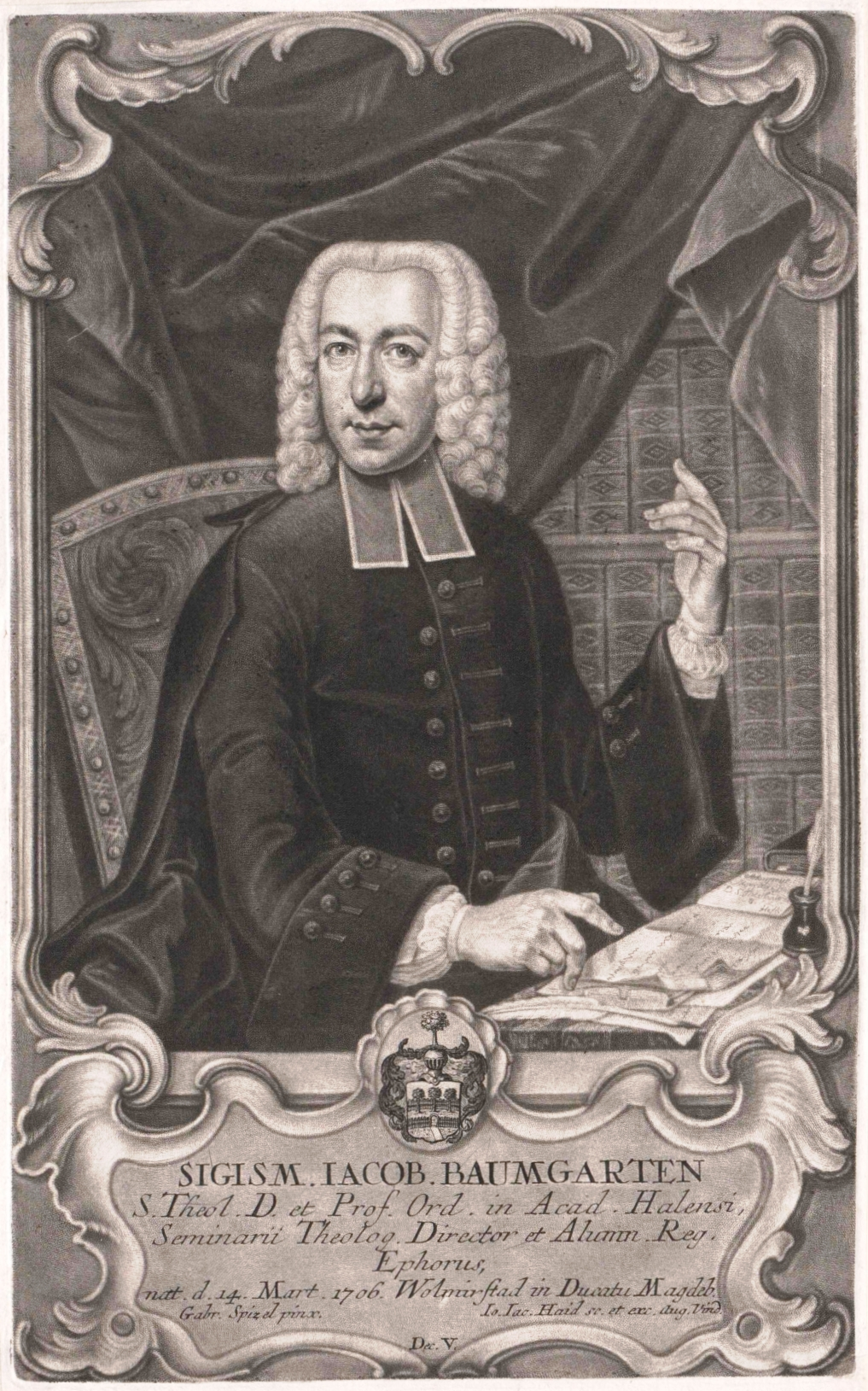
Siegmund Jakob Baumgarten

- Anne Catherine of Brandenburg (1575–1612), Queen of Denmark
- Christian Wilhelm of Brandenburg (1587–1665), Markgraf
- Siegmund Jakob Baumgarten (1706–1757), the theologian at the Friedrichs-University Halle
- Friedrich Schrader (1865–1922), journalist and writer
- Hans Schmidt (1877–1953), theologian
- Gerd Domhardt (1945–1997), composer
- Steffen Wesemann (born 1971), cyclist
- Carlo Westphal (born 1985), cyclist
