= Megchelen =

- Buurtschap
- Interactive map of Megchelen
- Coordinates: 51°50′16″N 6°23′34″E
- Country: Netherlands
- Province: Gelderland
- Municipality: Oude IJsselstreek

Area
  - Total: 7.14 km^{2} (2.76 sq mi)

Population (2007)
  - Total: 1,000

Megchelen is a village in the Dutch province of Gelderland. It is a tiny hook of land surrounded on three sides by the German border in the municipality of Oude IJsselstreek, about 7 km southeast of the town of Ulft on the Zwanenburgseweg.

== List of Rijksmonuments in Megchelen ==
Megchelen is home to 7 rijksmonuments.

Description	Original function^{?}	Built	Architect	Location	Coordinates^{?}	No.^{?}	Image
Dutch reformed church	Kerk en kerkonderdeel	1411		Koninginneweg 14	51°50′14″N 6°23′39″E	16071	
Landfort, main building	Kasteel, buitenplaats	1825-1827		Landfortseweg 4	51°51′11″N 6°24′25″E	512220	
Landfort, court and park	Tuin, park en plantsoen			Landfortseweg bij 4	51°51′10″N 6°24′10″E	512223	
Landfort, bridge	Tuin, park en plantsoen	1903		Landfortseweg bij 4	51°51′10″N 6°24′10″E	512224	
Landfort, dovecote	Tuin, park en plantsoen	1825		Landfortseweg bij 4	51°51′10″N 6°24′10″E	512225	
Landfort, garden wall	Tuin, park en plantsoen			Landfortseweg bij 4	51°51′10″N 6°24′10″E	512226	
Landfort, iron bridge	Tuin, park en plantsoen	1872		Landfortseweg bij 4	51°51′10″N 6°24′10″E	512227	
