= Varsselder =

- Village
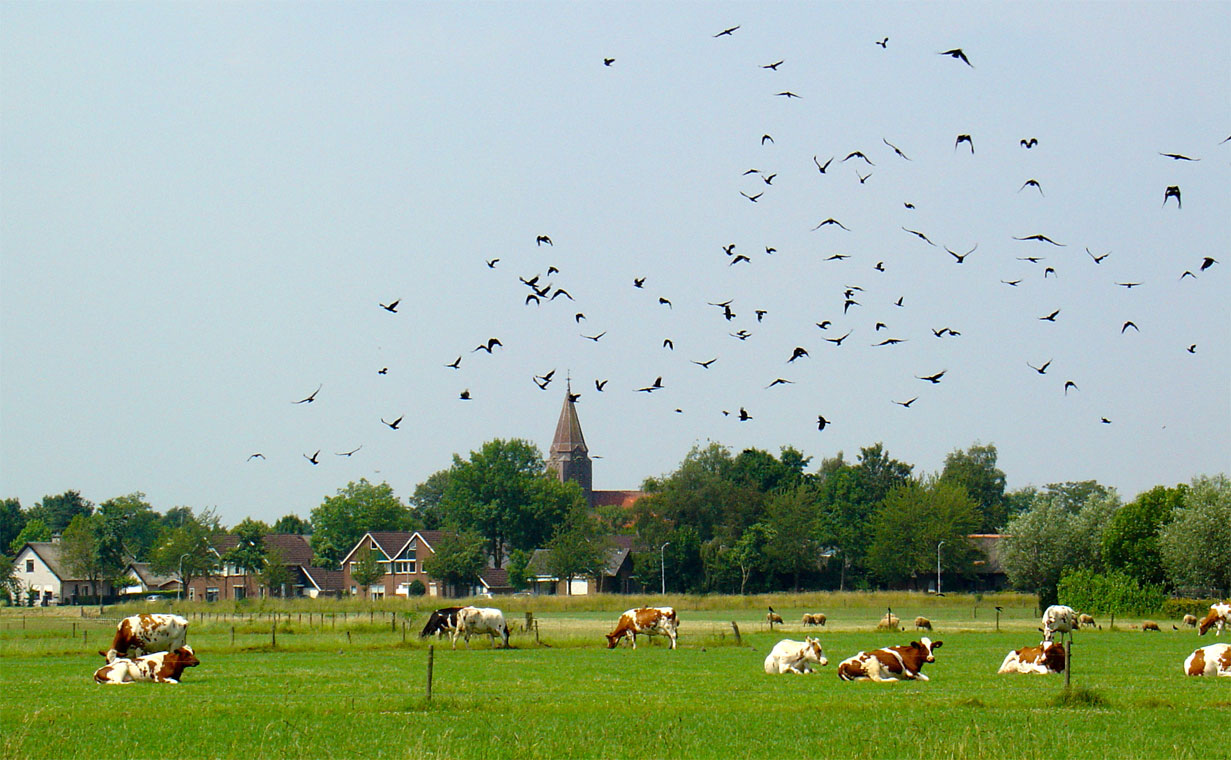

- Location in the Netherlands Varsselder (Netherlands)
- Coordinates: 51°53′15″N 6°21′38″E
- Country: Netherlands
- Province: Gelderland
- Municipality: Oude IJsselstreek

Area
  - Total: 5.09 km^{2} (1.97 sq mi)
- Elevation: 15 m (49 ft)

Population (2021)
  - Total: 1,080
  - Density: 212/km^{2} (550/sq mi)
- Time zone: UTC+1 (CET)
  - Summer (DST): UTC+2 (CEST)
- Postal code: 7076
- Dialing code: 0315

Varsselder is a Dutch village situated in the Gelderland region Achterhoek, in the municipality Oude IJsselstreek. It is situated directly to the west of Ulft and it is crossed by the road from Ulft to 's-Heerenberg (N816).

The church is called Martelaren van Gorcumkerk. The village has a former windmill.

Veldhunten is a smaller rural settlement close to Varsselder.

== Gallery ==
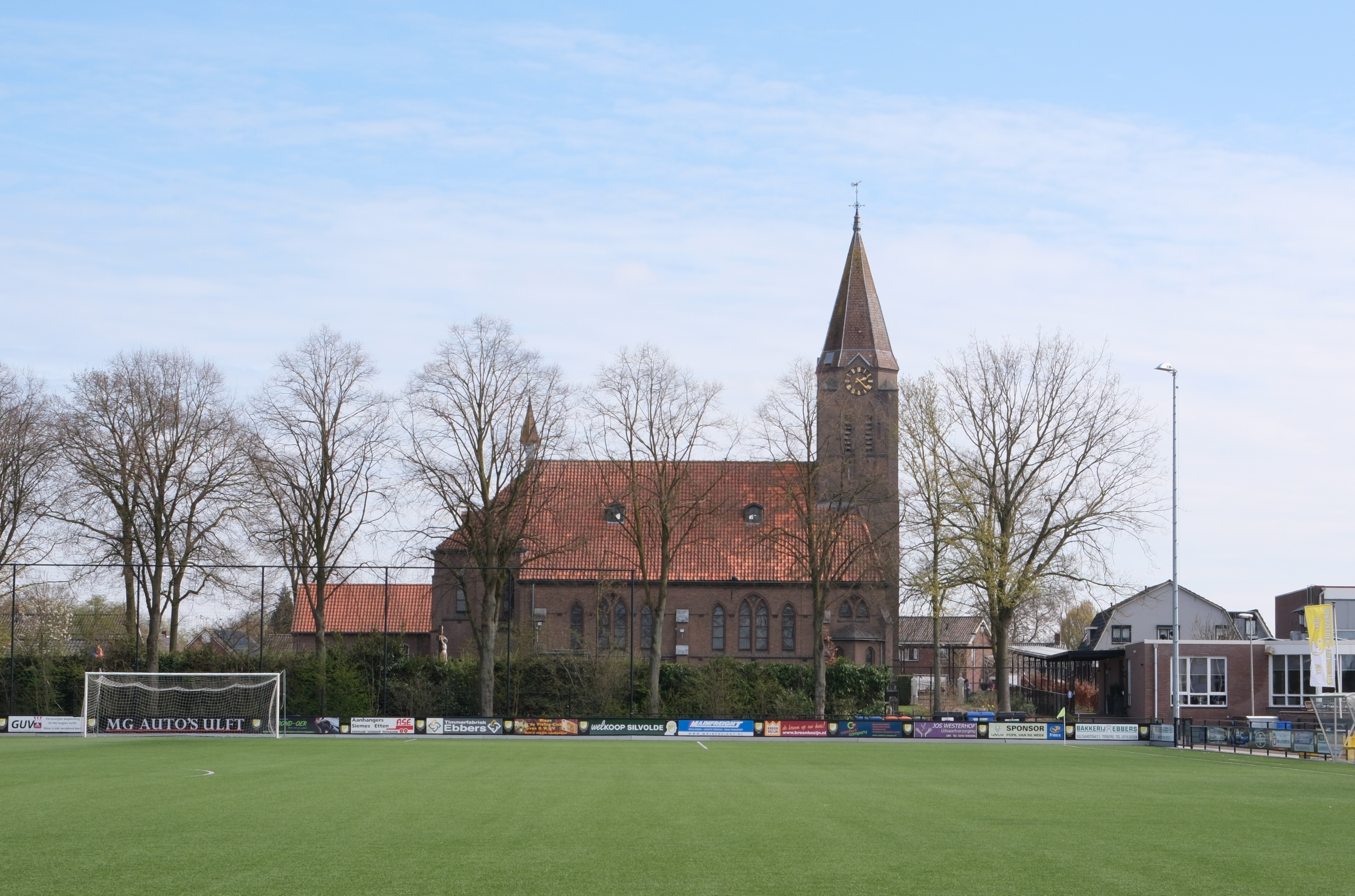
Church: Martelaren van Gorcumkerk

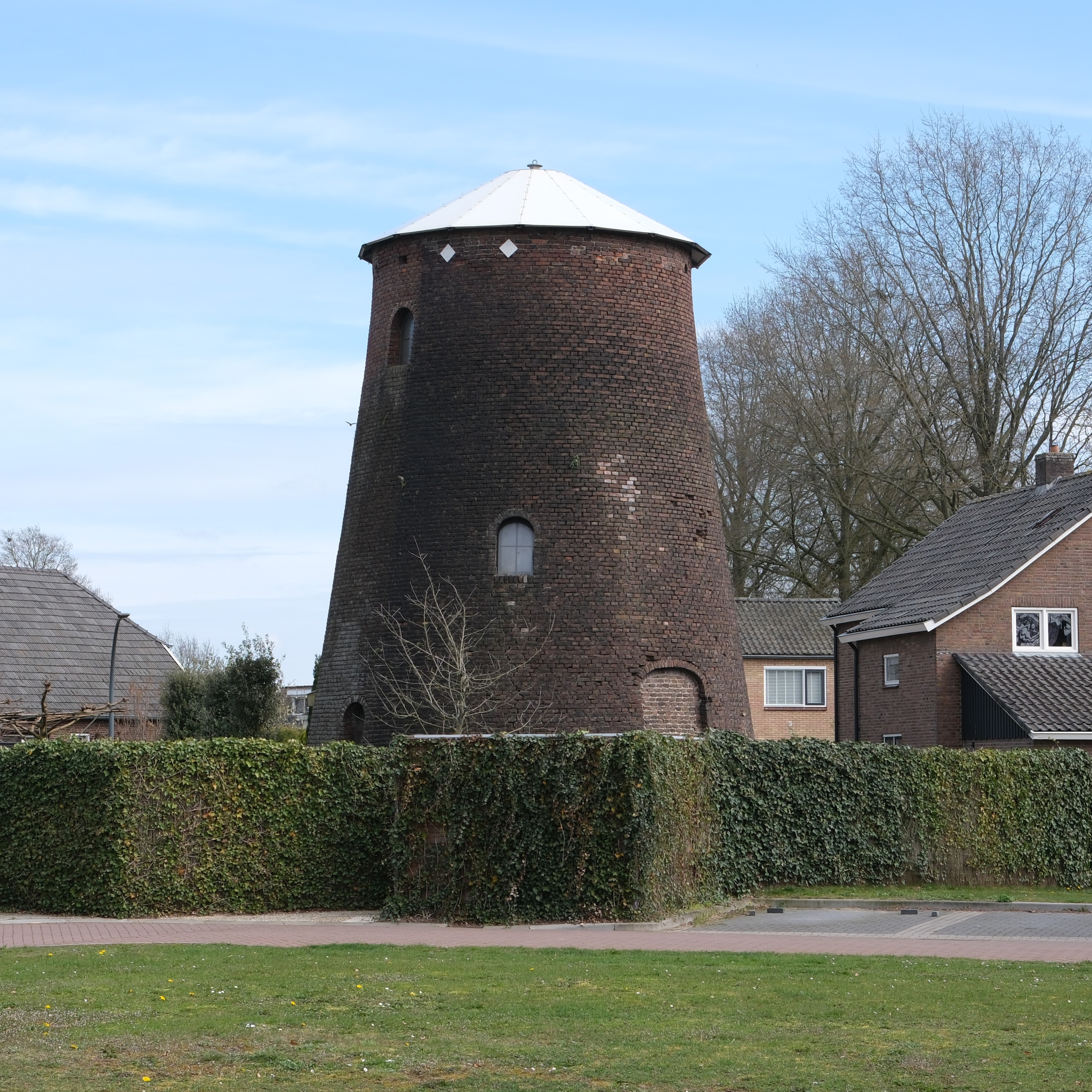
Molen Lukassen

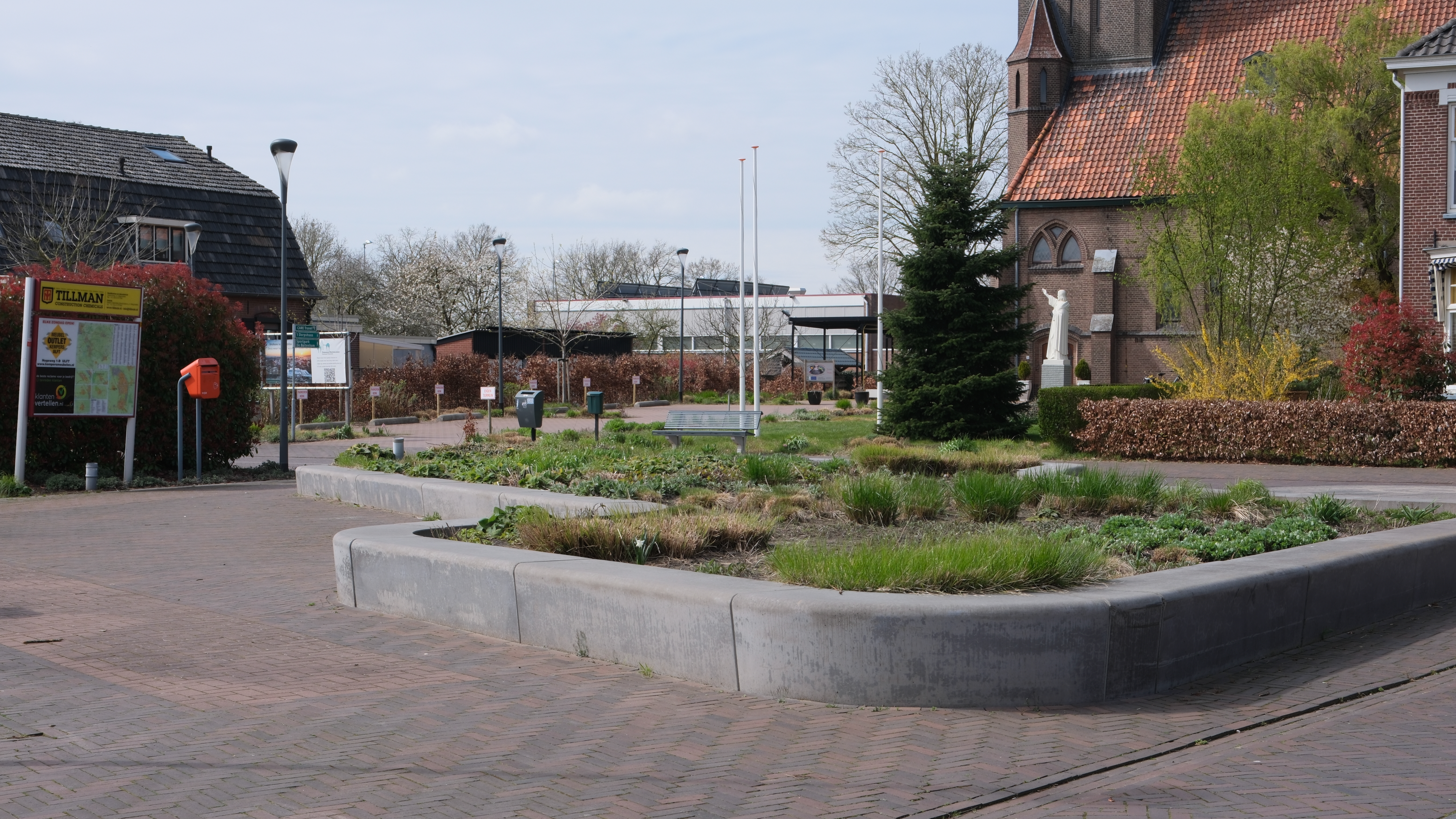
Hoofdstraat

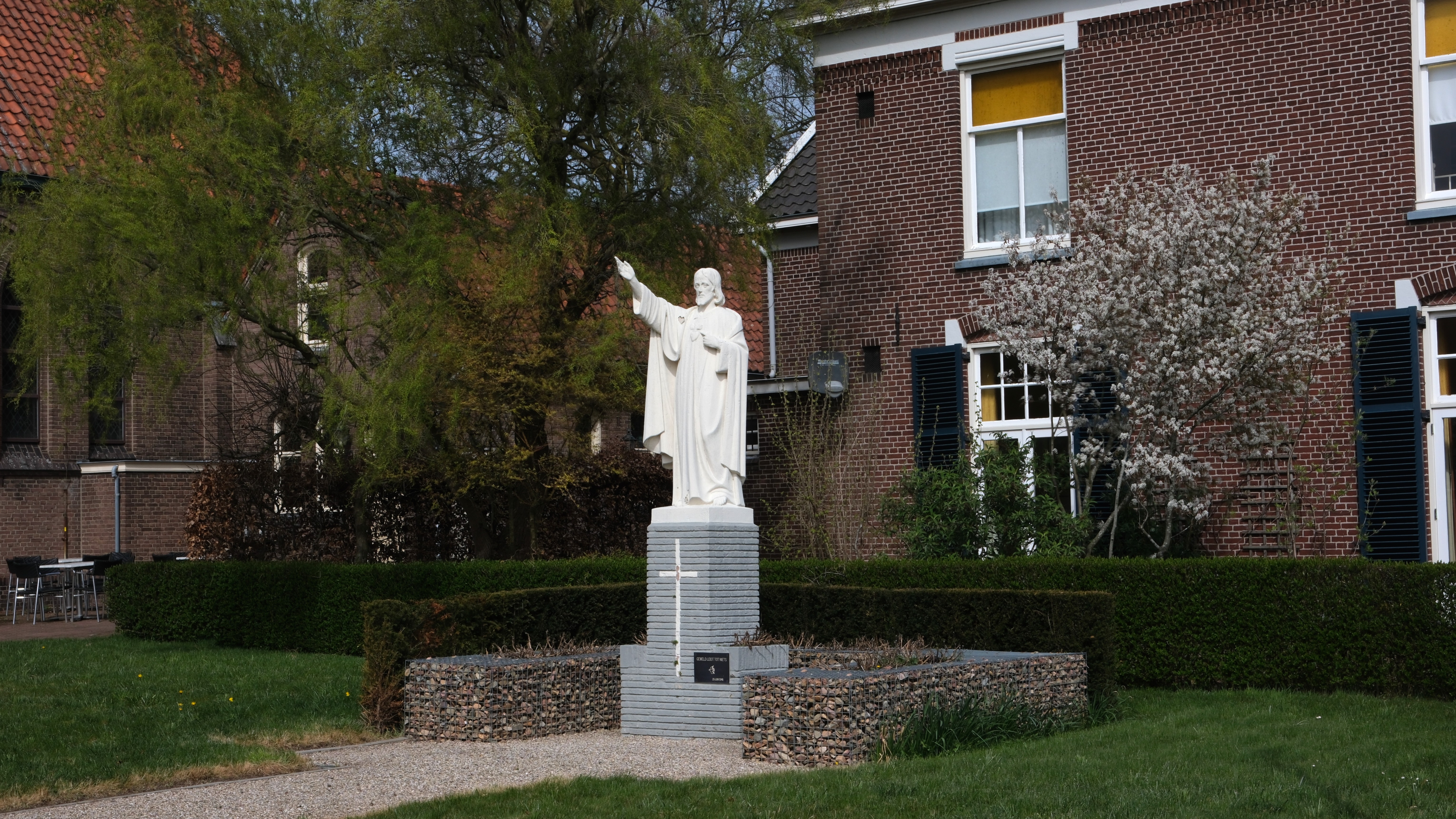
Sacred Heart statue

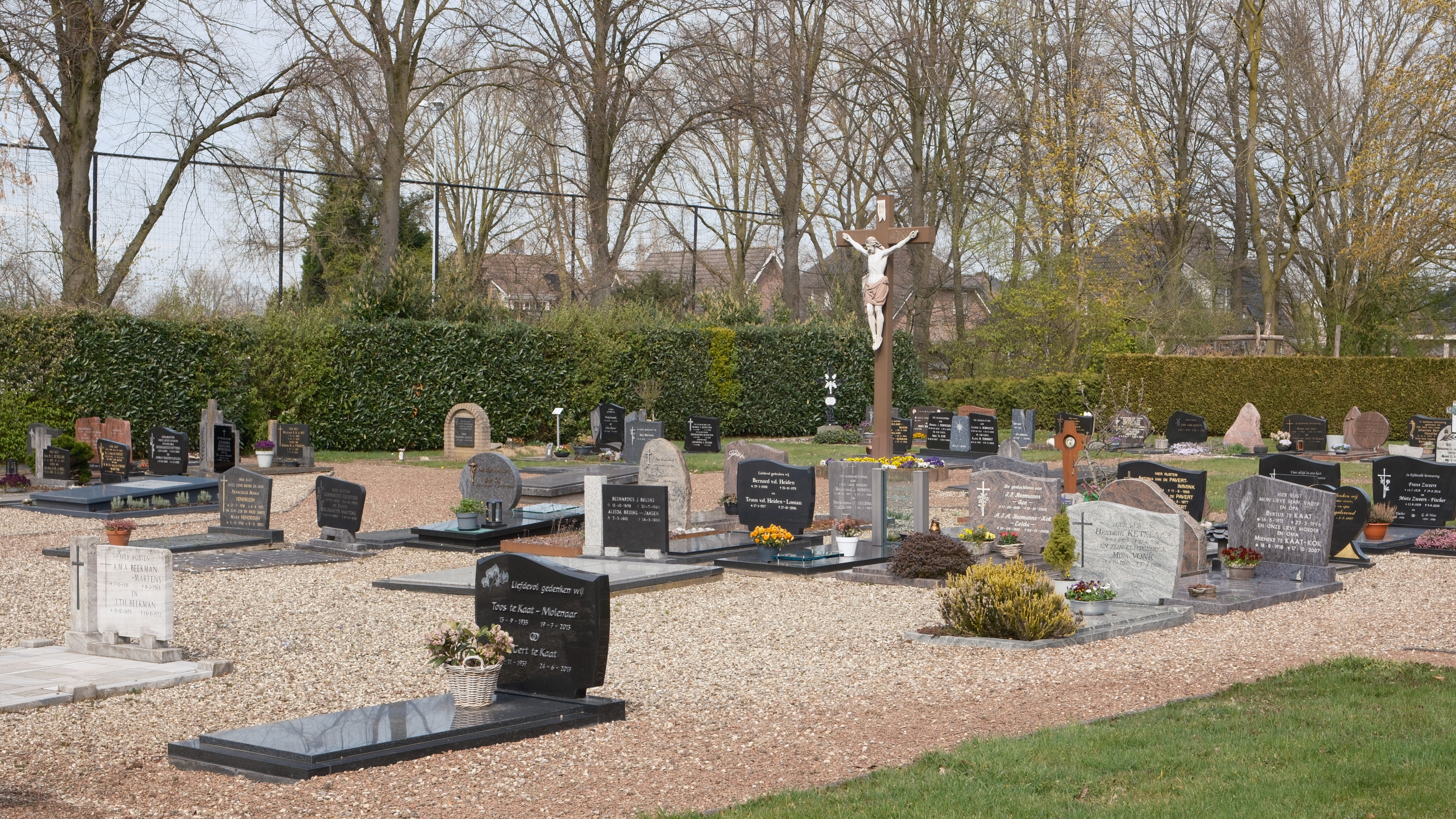
Cemetary

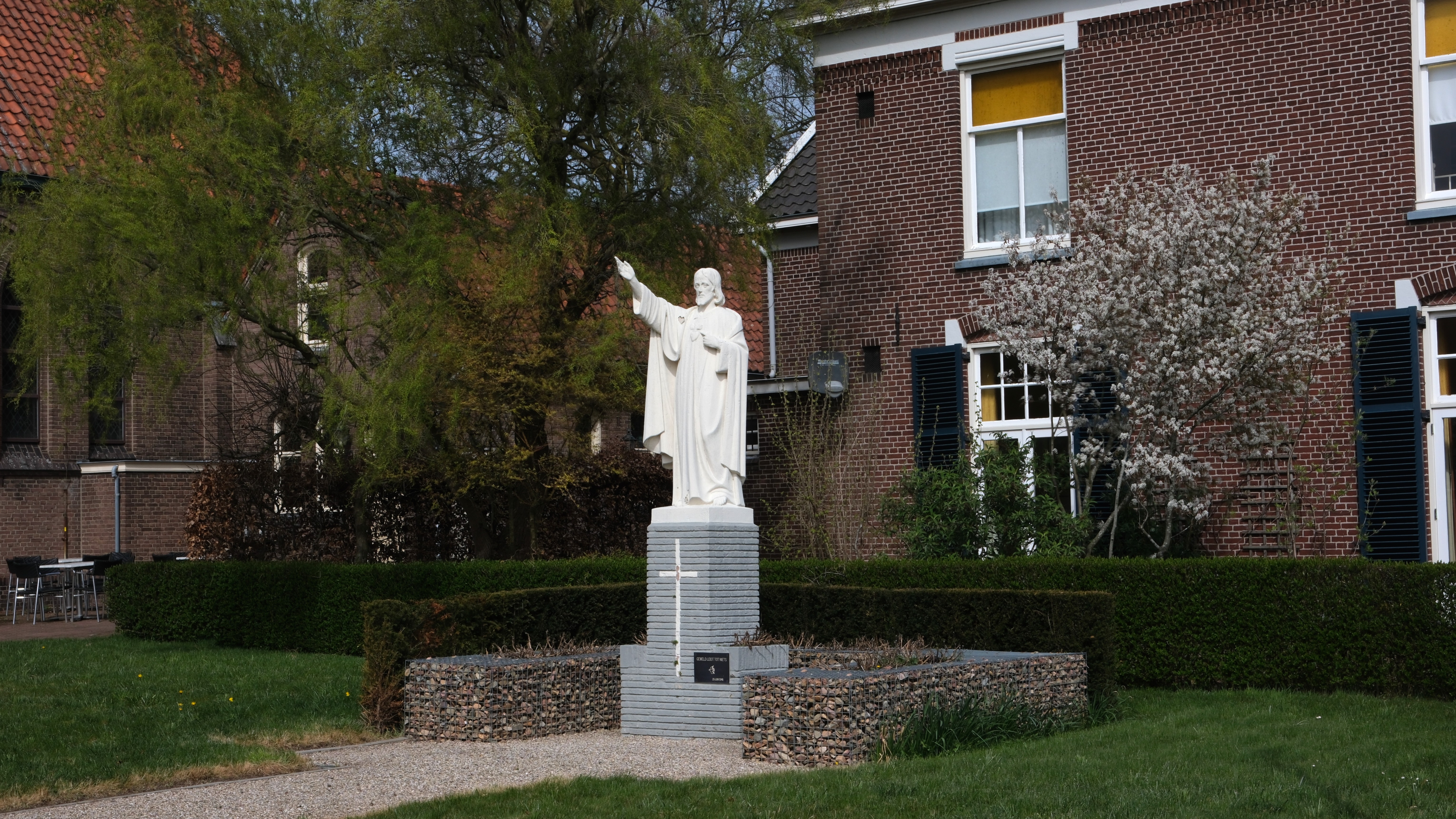
Dorpshuis, community centre
