= Bontebrug =

- Village
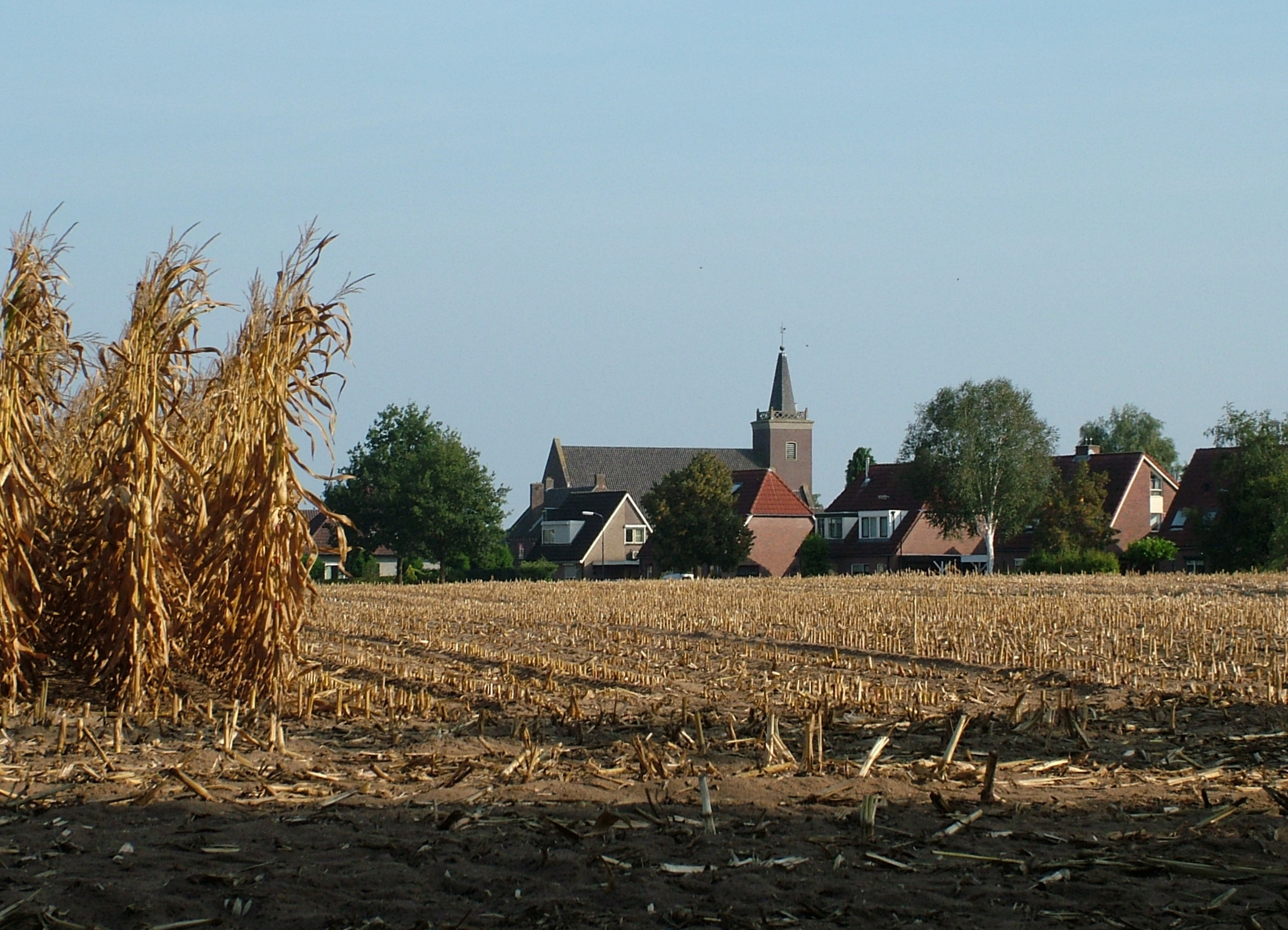
- Bontebrug as seen from the north west

- Location in the Netherlands Bontebrug (Netherlands)
- Coordinates: 51.8942°N 6.3939°E
- Country: Netherlands
- Province: Gelderland
- Municipality: Oude IJsselstreek

Area
  - Total: 0.16 km^{2} (0.062 sq mi)
- Elevation: 17 m (56 ft)

Population (2021)
  - Total: 155
  - Density: 970/km^{2} (2,500/sq mi)
- Time zone: UTC+1 (CET)
  - Summer (DST): UTC+2 (CEST)
- Postal code: 7064
- Dialing code: 0315

Bontebrug is a village in the municipality of Oude IJsselstreek in the Dutch province of Gelderland. It is on the eastern bank of the river Oude IJssel south of Silvolde. On the other side of the river lies the village Ulft. For shopping and recreation, the inhabitants have to go there.

== History ==
It was first mentioned in 1839 as Bontebrug, and is a name of noble family. Bontebrug has also been called Nieuwdorp from the 1940s until the 1960s. Bontebrug used to be part of the municipality Wisch, which has merged into Oude IJsselstreek. The first Dutch Reformed Church was built in 1887. It was replaced in 1932, but burnt down by the Germans in 1945. In 1949, the current church built and a tower was added in 1952.

== Gallery ==
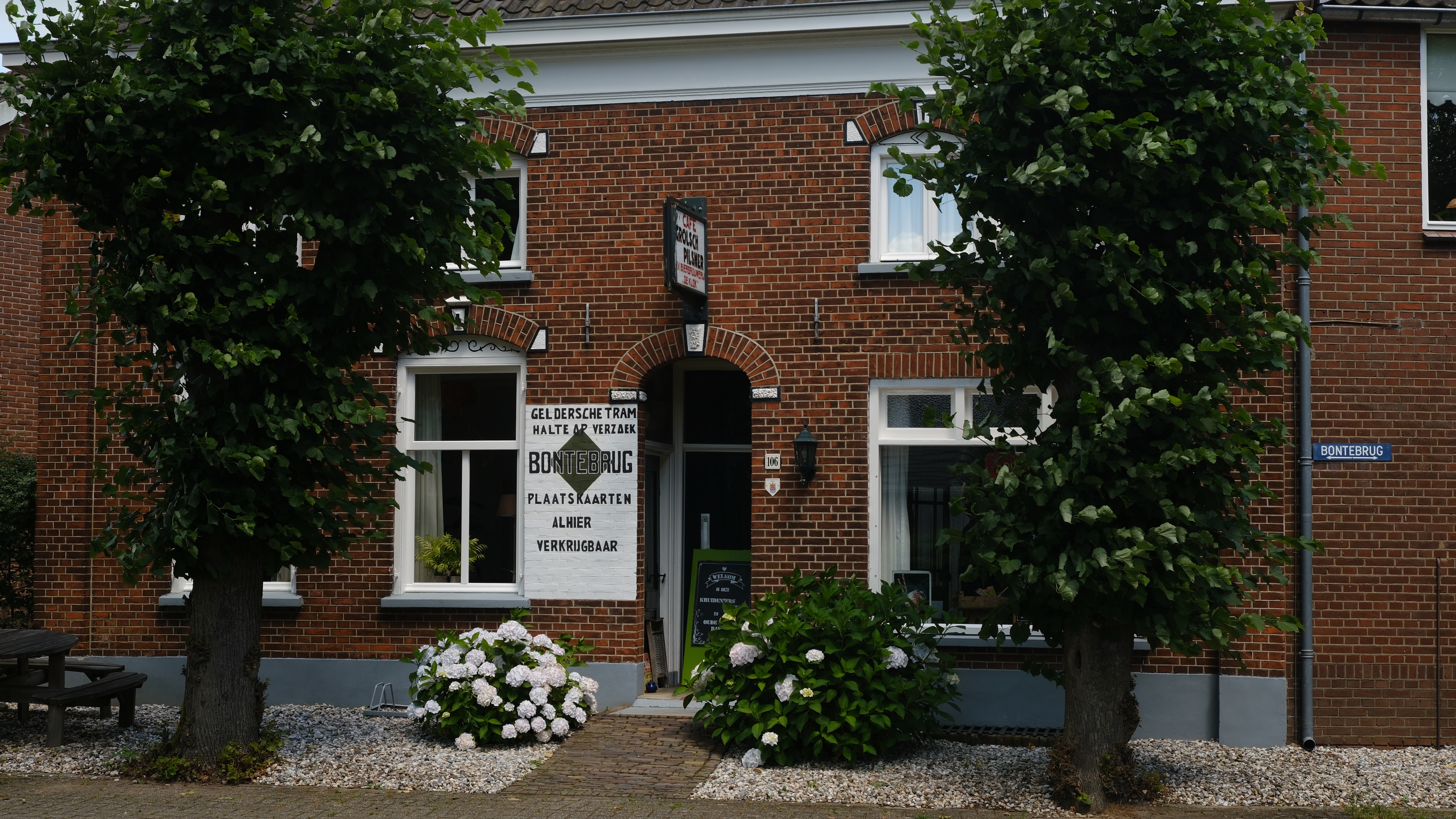
Former pub, now shop in Bontebrug

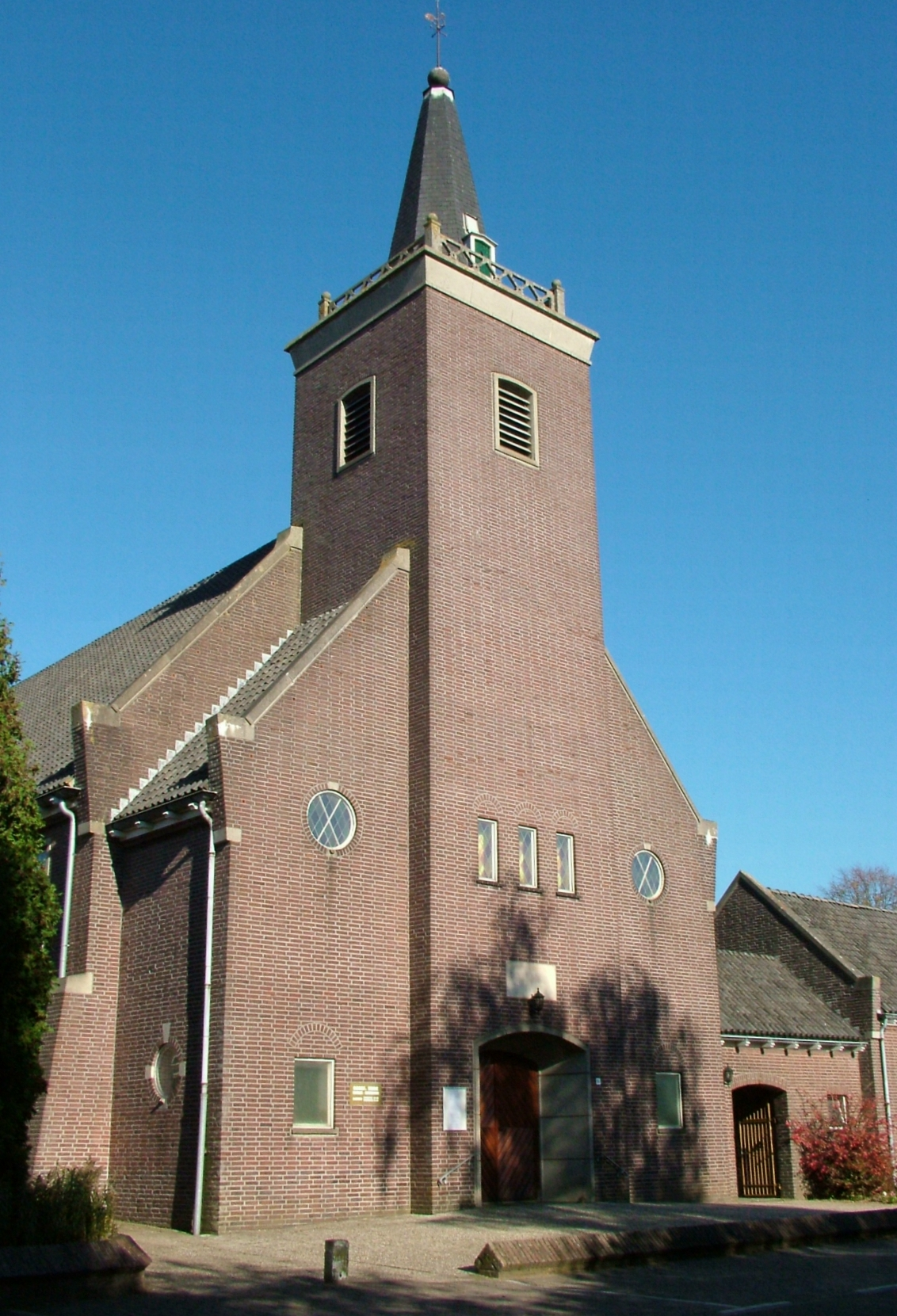
Former church of Bontebrug
