= Voorst, Oude IJsselstreek =

Voorst
- Hamlet
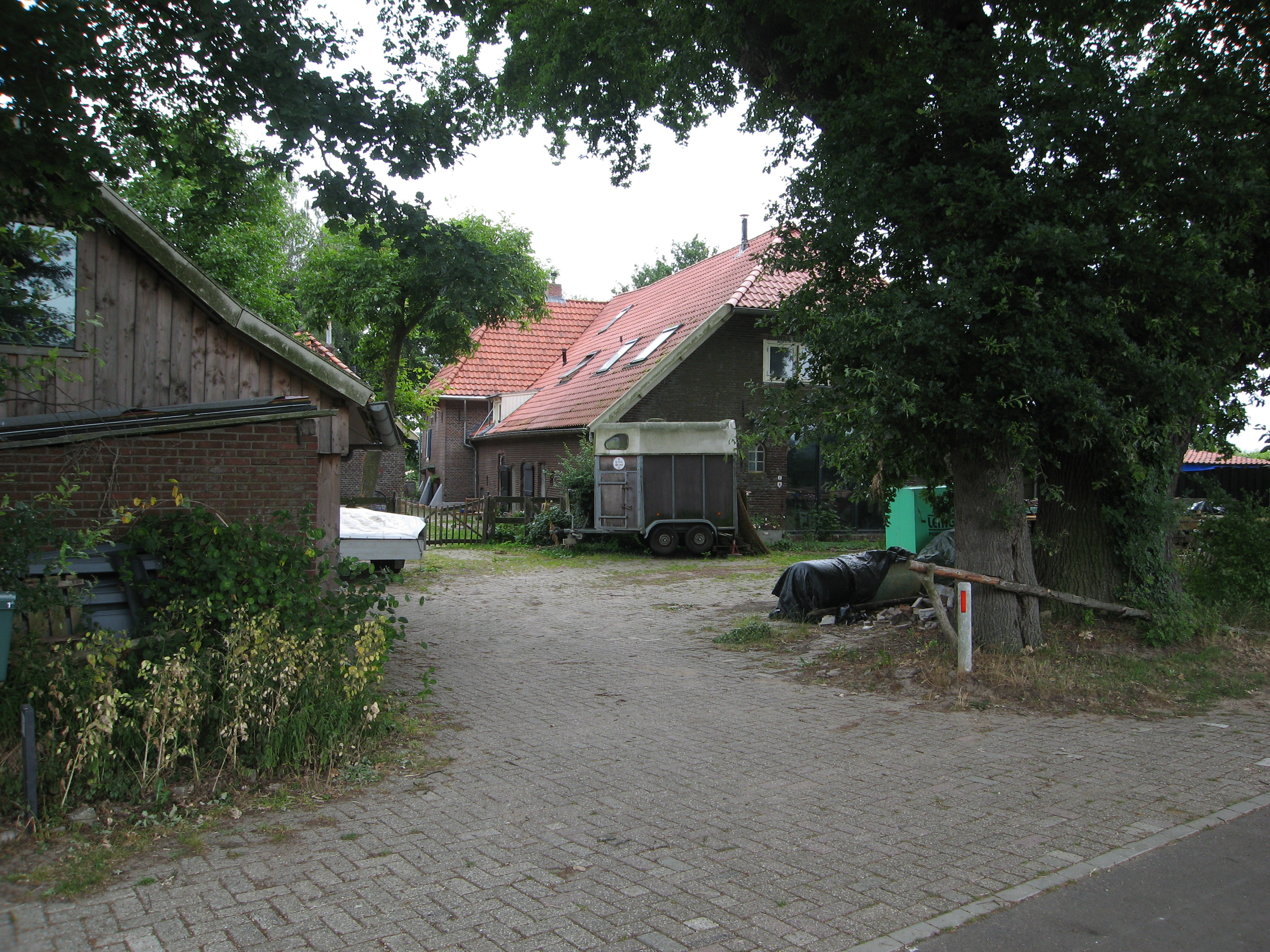
- Farm in Voorst

- Location in the Netherlands Voorst (Netherlands)
- Coordinates: 51°52′36″N 6°24′52″E
- Country: Netherlands
- Province: Gelderland
- Municipality: Oude IJsselstreek

Area
  - Total: 7.74 km^{2} (2.99 sq mi)
- Elevation: 17 m (56 ft)

Population (2021)
  - Total: 315
  - Density: 40.7/km^{2} (105/sq mi)
- Time zone: UTC+1 (CET)
  - Summer (DST): UTC+2 (CEST)
- Postal code: 7083
- Dialing code: 0315

Voorst is a village in the Dutch province of Gelderland. It is located in the municipality of Oude IJsselstreek, about 3 km east of the town of Gendringen.

It was first mentioned in 1329 as Forsto, and is the name of a manor house.
