= DRU Industriepark =

Coordinates: 51.89641°N 6.38201°E

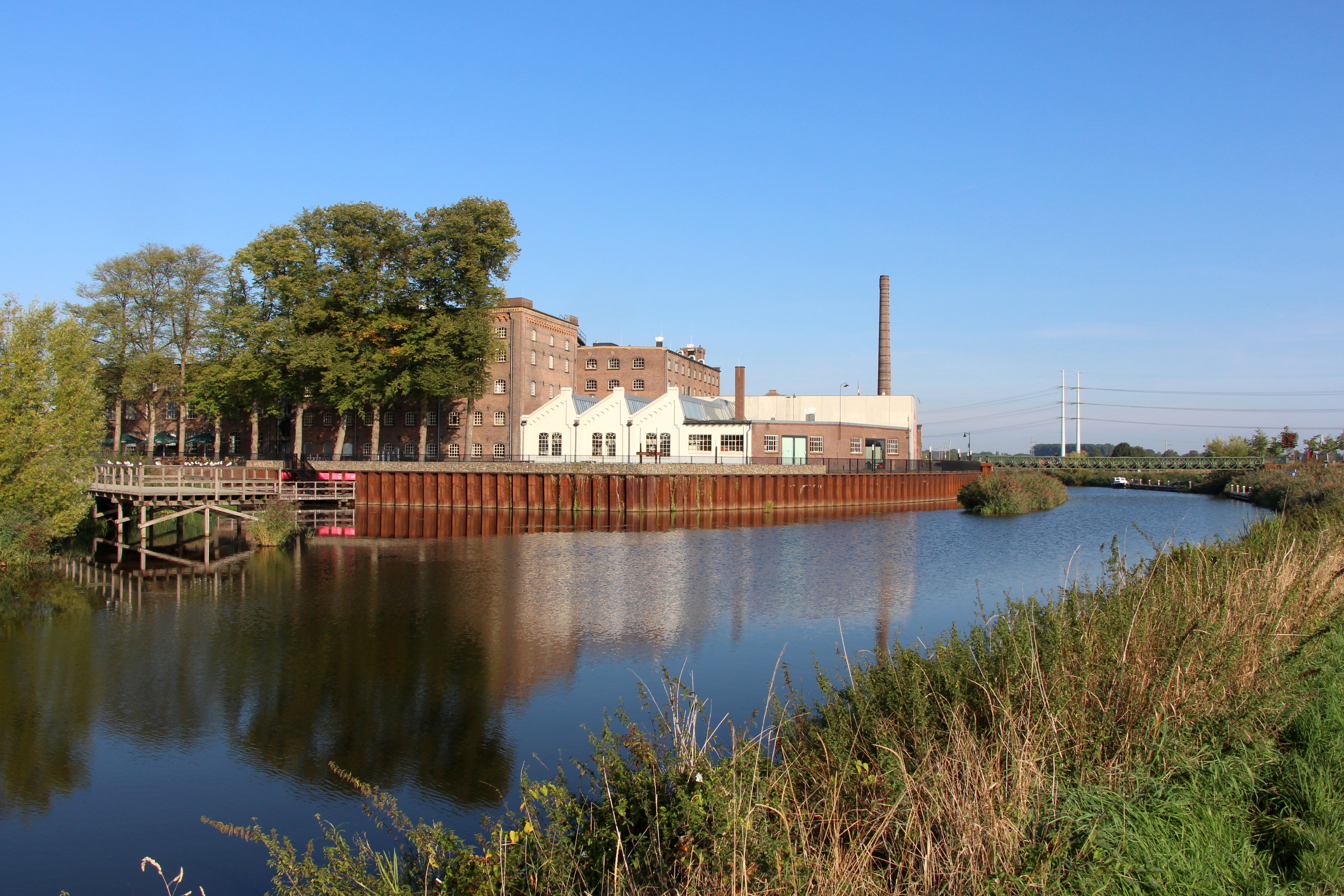
The ensemble of the DRU Industriepark at the river Oude IJssel

The DRU Industriepark (several spellings and versions; until December 2010: DRU-fabriek or Drufabriek) is the most important cultural centre of the municipality Oude IJsselstreek in the east of the Netherlands. The 'culture factory' in the northeast of the village Ulft is situated by the river Oude IJssel, Netherlands.

The basis for the centre are buildings of the former ironworks of Diepenbrock en Reigers te Ulft (DRU). In 2003, the company DRU has moved to Duiven. The company still exists, but it is no longer related to the complex in Ulft.

The buildings in Ulft are protected national monuments. The whole ensemble includes also the buildings of the Beltmancomplex with the highly visible water tower. These are used now as residences. Another notable building is the portiersgebouw now also known as the Cultuurfabriek, which houses the library of Ulft, a theater, the meeting hall of the municipality council, and other facilities.

== Gallery ==
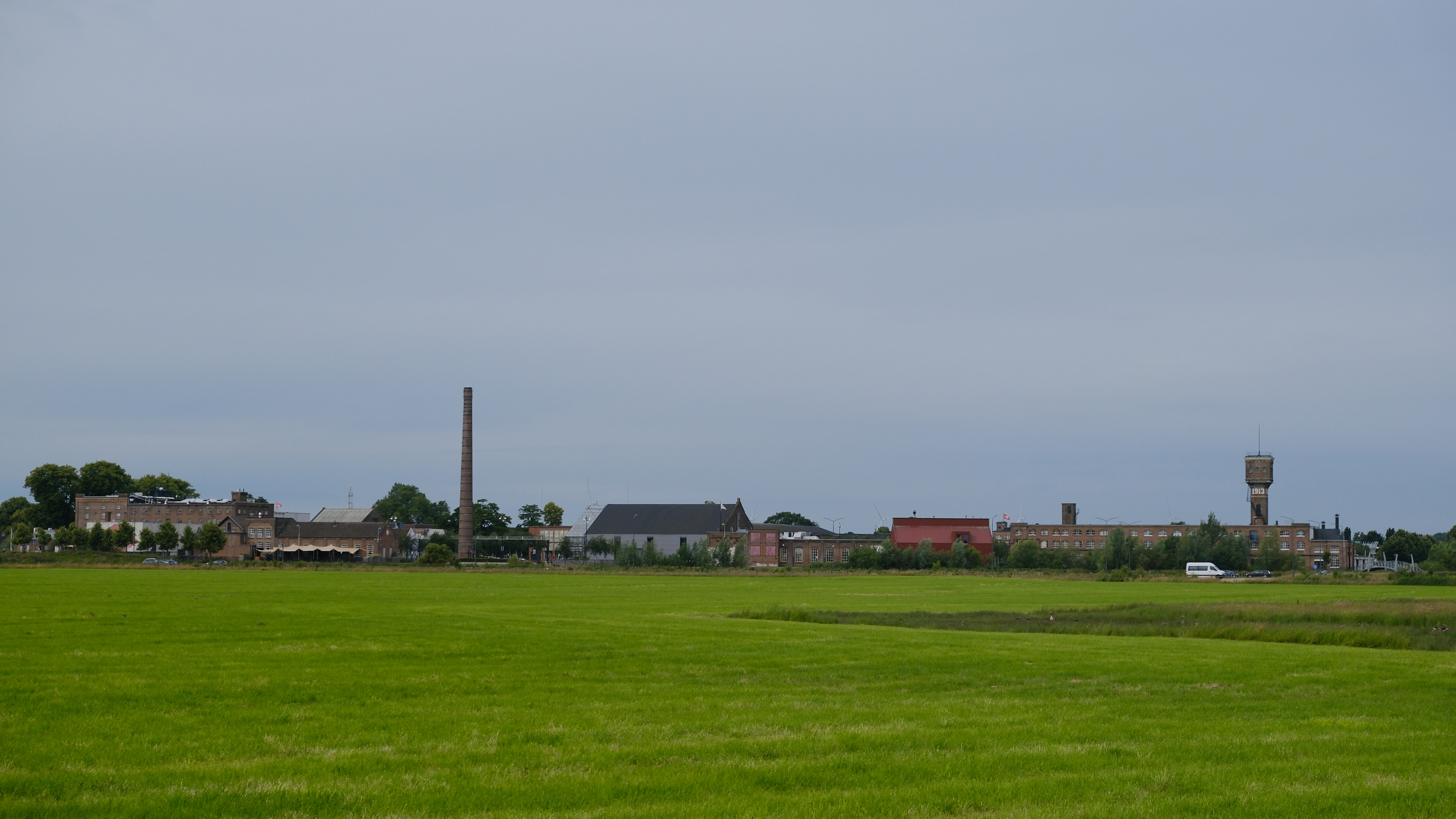
View from a distance, from the other side of the Oude IJssel

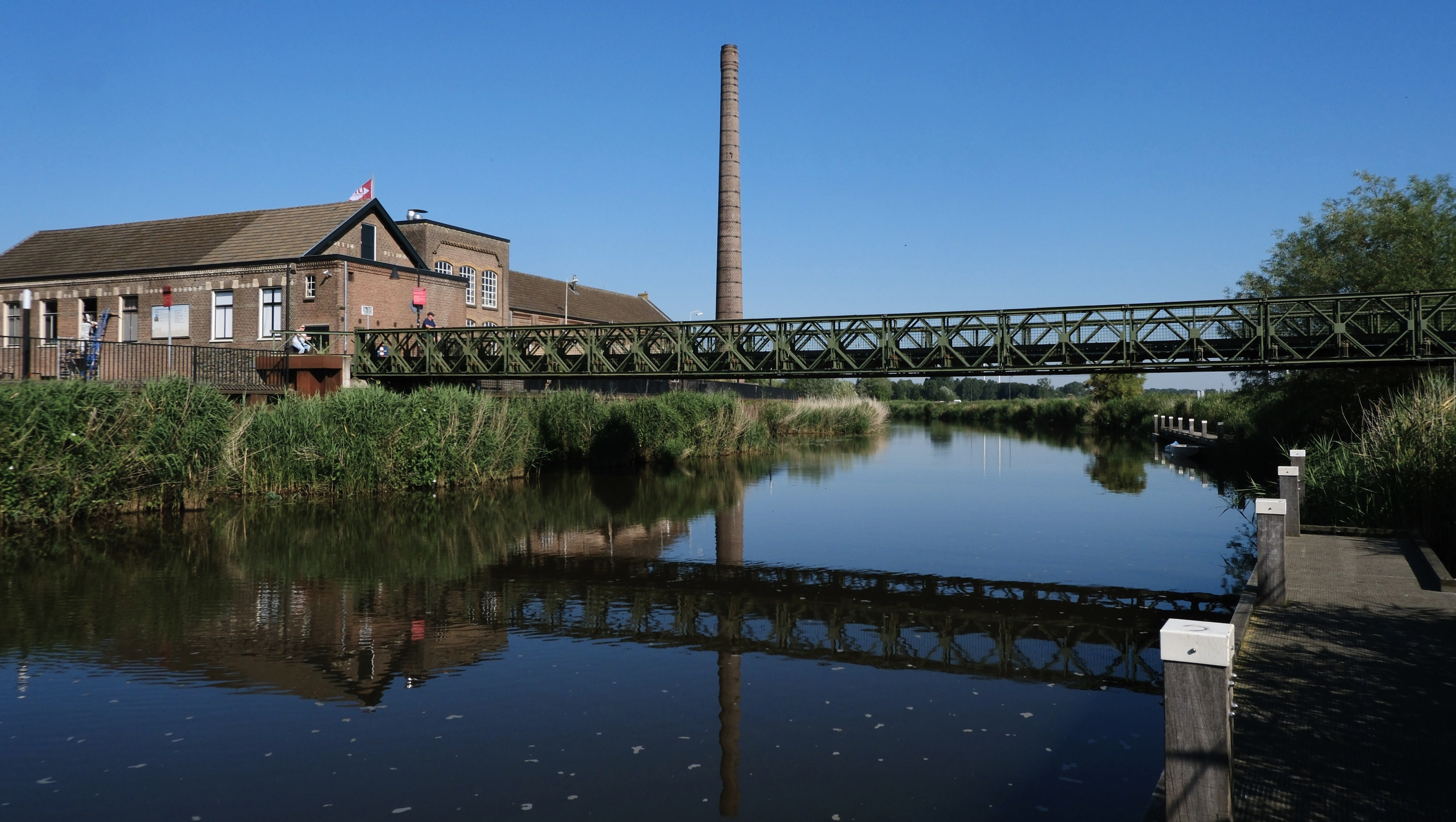
Baileybridge and chimney De Fakkel

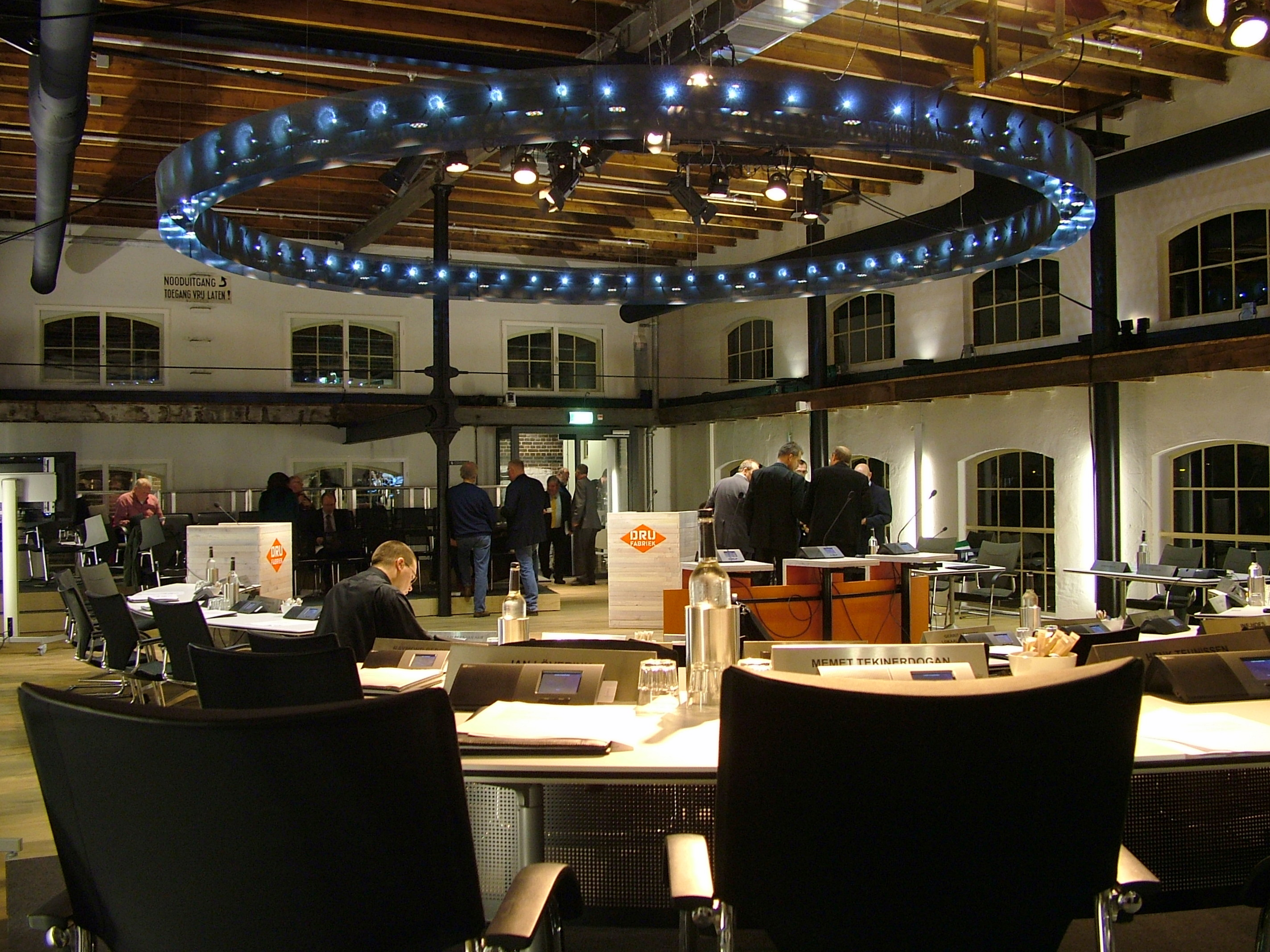
Conference room

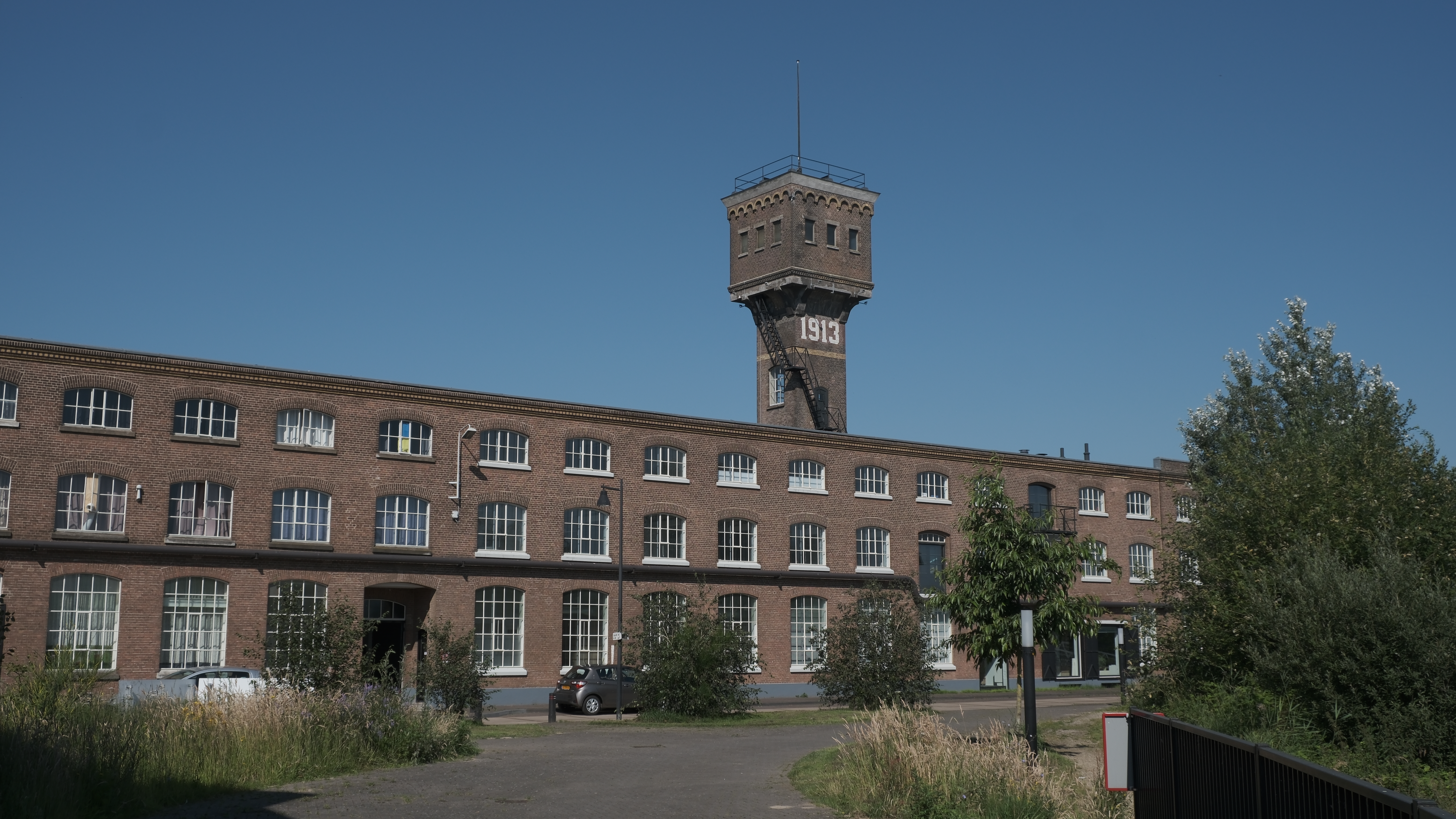
Beltman-complex (now residences) with water tower

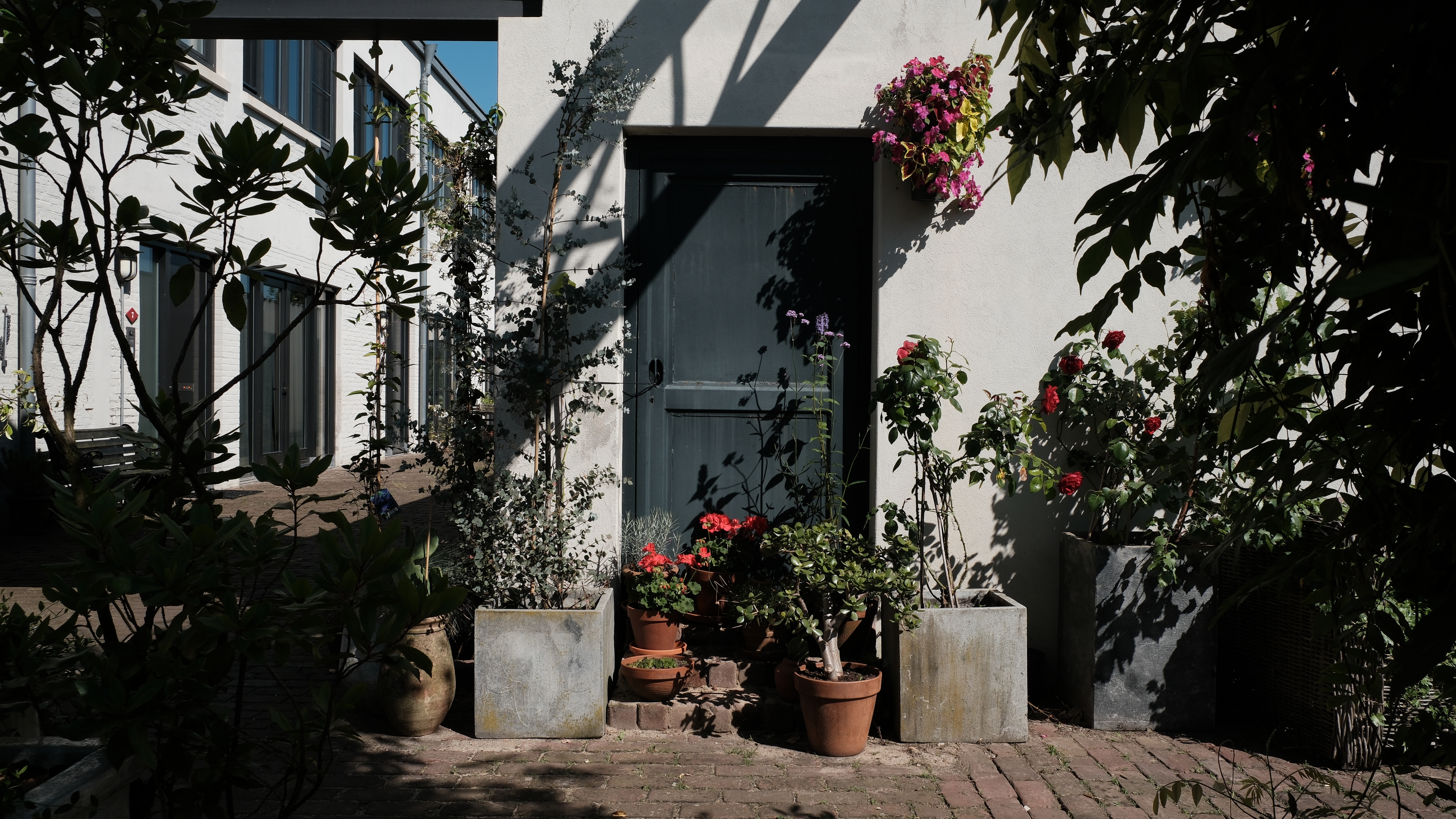
Small yard

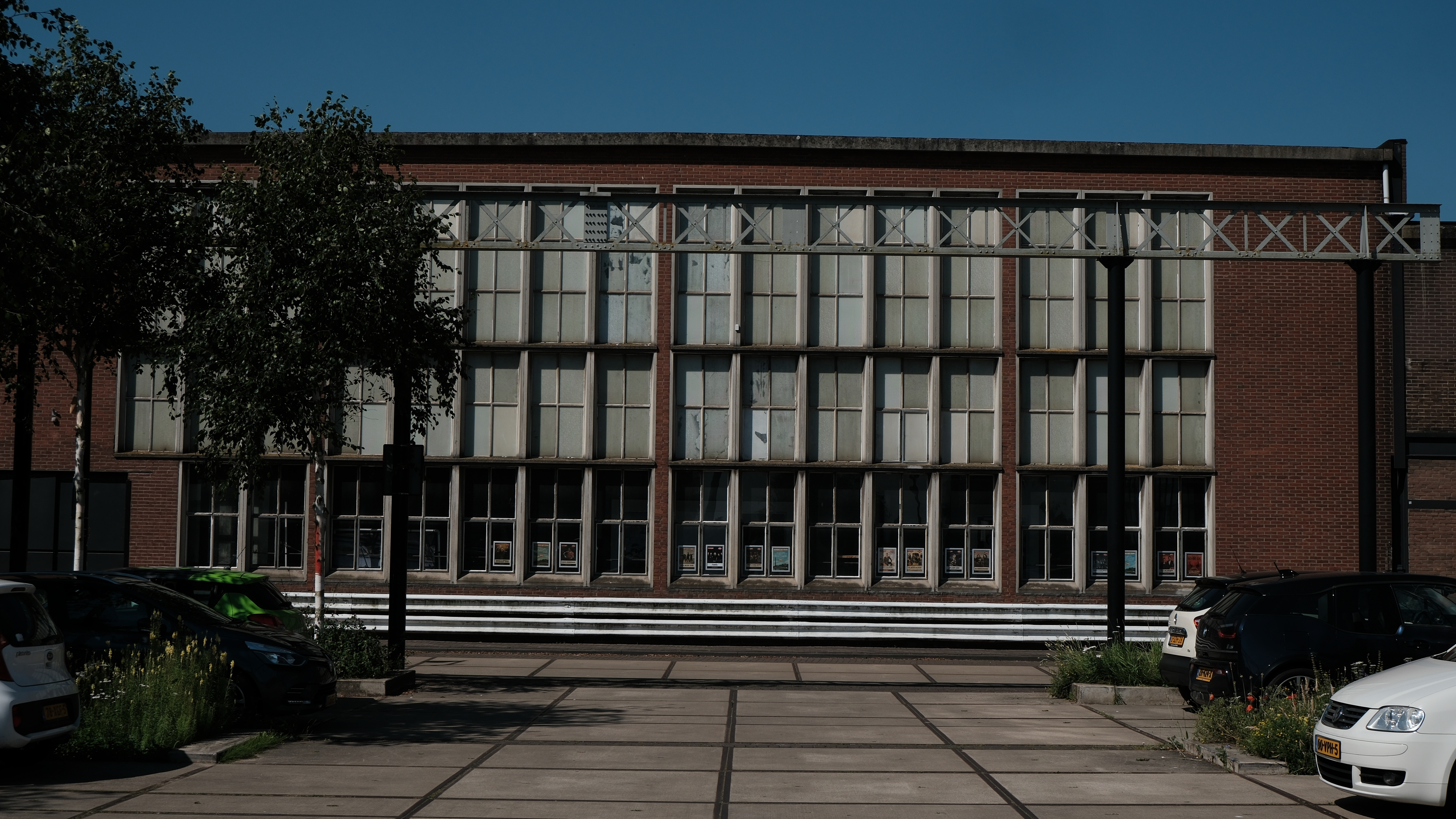
SSP-hal, event space

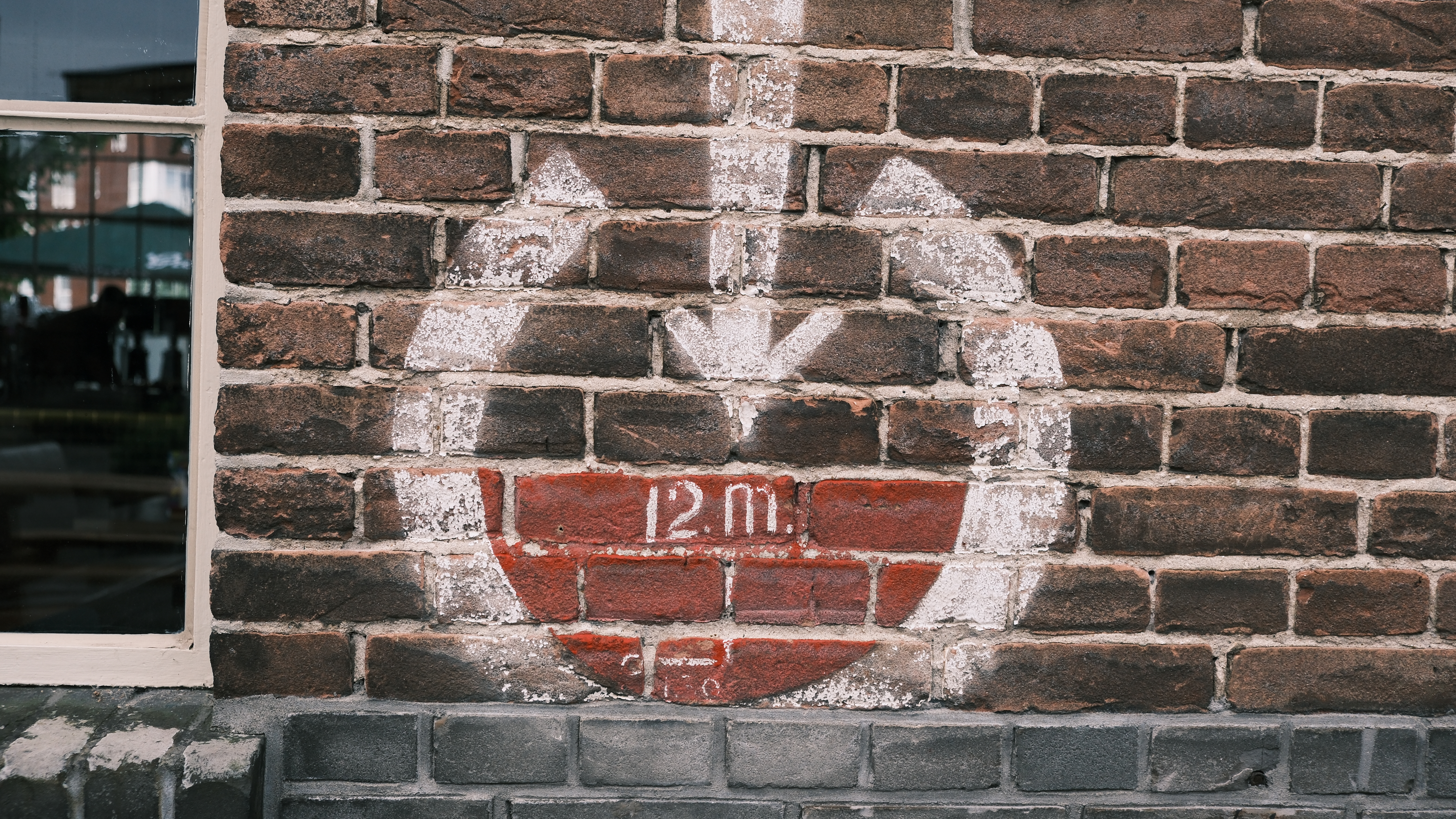
Old wall painting

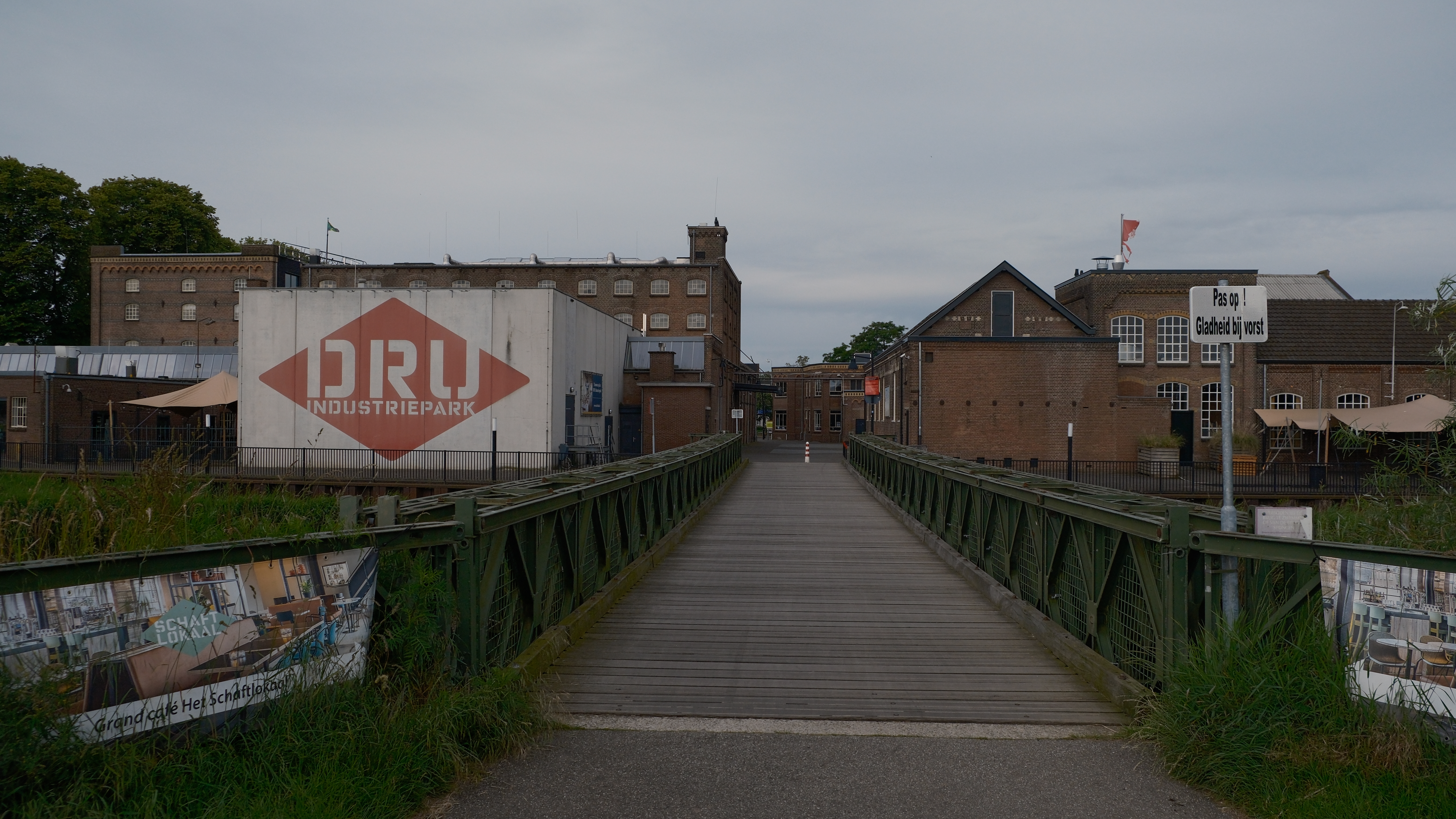
Using the bridge from the other side of the Oude IJssel
