= Oude IJsselstreek =

- Municipality
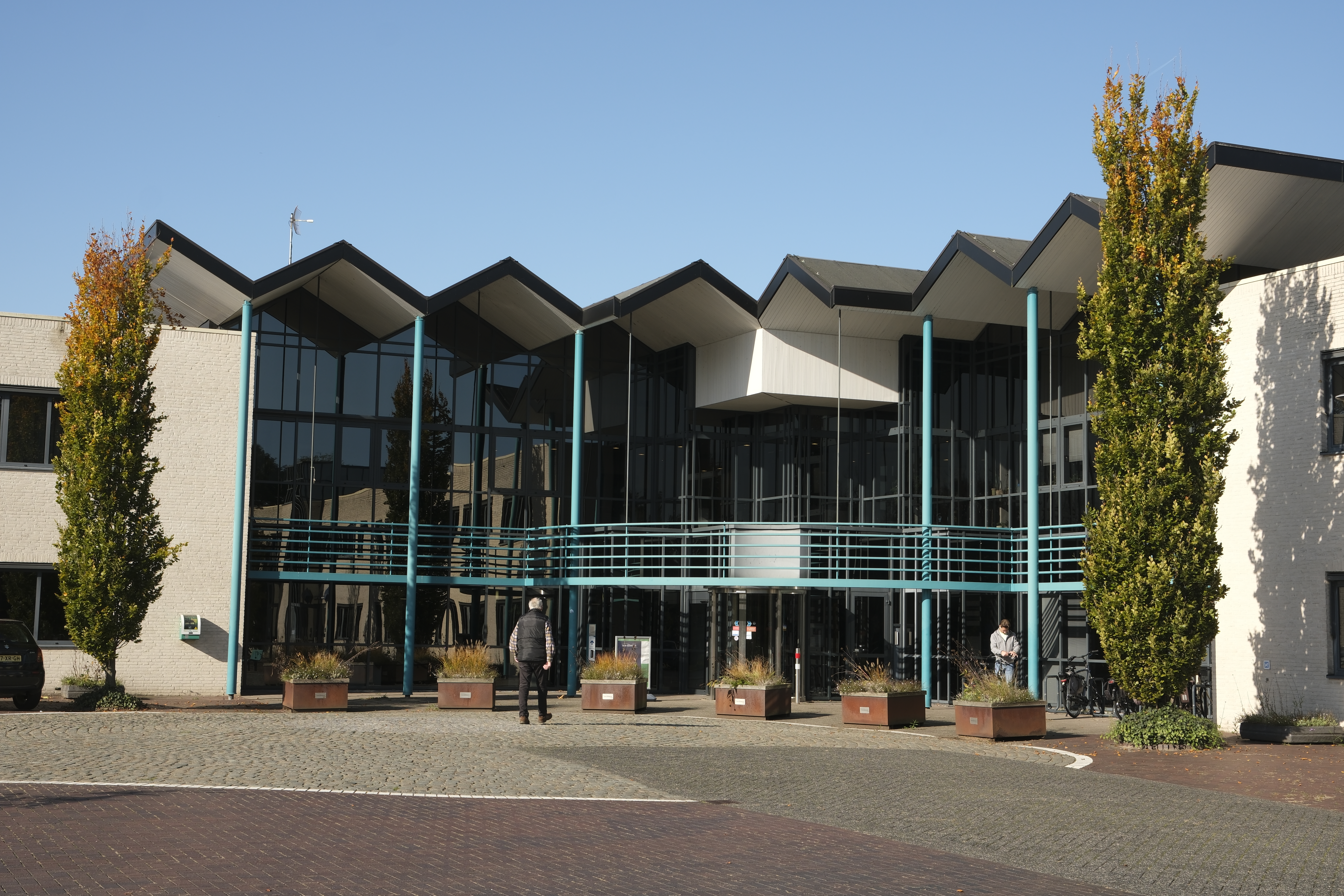
- Town hall in Gendringen

- Flag Coat of arms

- Location in Gelderland
- Coordinates: 51°53′N 6°23′E
- Country: Netherlands
- Province: Gelderland
- Established: 1 January 2005

Government
  - Body: Municipal council
  - Mayor: Laura Werger (VVD)

Area
  - Total: 137.95 km^{2} (53.26 sq mi)
  - Land: 136.15 km^{2} (52.57 sq mi)
  - Water: 1.80 km^{2} (0.69 sq mi)
- Elevation: 15 m (49 ft)
- Highest elevation: 33 m (108 ft)

Population (January 2021)
  - Total: 39,346
  - Density: 289/km^{2} (750/sq mi)
- Time zone: UTC+1 (CET)
  - Summer (DST): UTC+2 (CEST)
- Postcode: 7050–7084
- Area code: 0315
- Website: www.oude-ijsselstreek.nl

Oude IJsselstreek (Dutch pronunciation: [ˌʌudə ˈʔɛisəlstreːk]) is a municipality in the province of Gelderland, in the eastern Netherlands. It was established on 1 January 2005 by a merger of the former municipalities of Gendringen and Wisch.

== Geography and population centres ==
The municipality belongs to the transition area between the rivers in the south, coming from Germany (Rhine and Issel), and the sandy soils of the Eastern Netherlands.

It has 15 population centres. Formerly from Gendringen

- Breedenbroek, Etten, Gendringen, Megchelen, Netterden, Ulft, Varsselder, and Voorst (not to be confused with the municipality of Voorst, also in Gelderland).

Formerly from Wisch

- Bontebrug, Heelweg-Oost and Heelweg-West, Silvolde, Sinderen, Terborg, Varsseveld, and Westendorp.

Terborg is the only population centre with city rights, but the largest one is Ulft with 10,000 inhabitants. The municipality of Oude IJsselstreek is considered to be divided into three units. The centres along the river Oude IJssel (Ulft, Gendringen, Etten on the left border, Silvolde and Terborg on the right) constitute the urban belt, Varsseveld in the east of the municipality is a rural village and the other centres are the external territories. The municipality plans to make Ulft the local centre.

== Municipality council ==
After the 2026 municipal elections, the 25 seats on the Oude IJsselstreek municipal council divided as follows:

- Lokaal Belang (Local Interests) – 7 seats
- DorpEnPlattelandBeweging – 5 seats
- Labour (P.v.d.A.) / GroenLinks – 3 seats
- Christian Democratic Appeal (CDA) – 2 seats
- People's Party for Freedom and Democracy (VVD) – 2 seats
- Achterhoeks Democratisch Alternatief – 2 seats
- Pro! Oude IJsselstreek – 2 seats
- Democrats 66 – 1 seat
- Burgers op – 1 seat

== Mayor ==
Hans Alberse became mayor of the newly established Oude IJsselstreek municipality in May 2006. In 2015 he resigned and was replaced with Steven de Vreeze. In July 2016 Otwin van Dijk became mayor. He resigned in 2024, and Mirjam Maasdam took over as acting mayor, to be replaced by Laura Werger in 2025.

== Topography ==
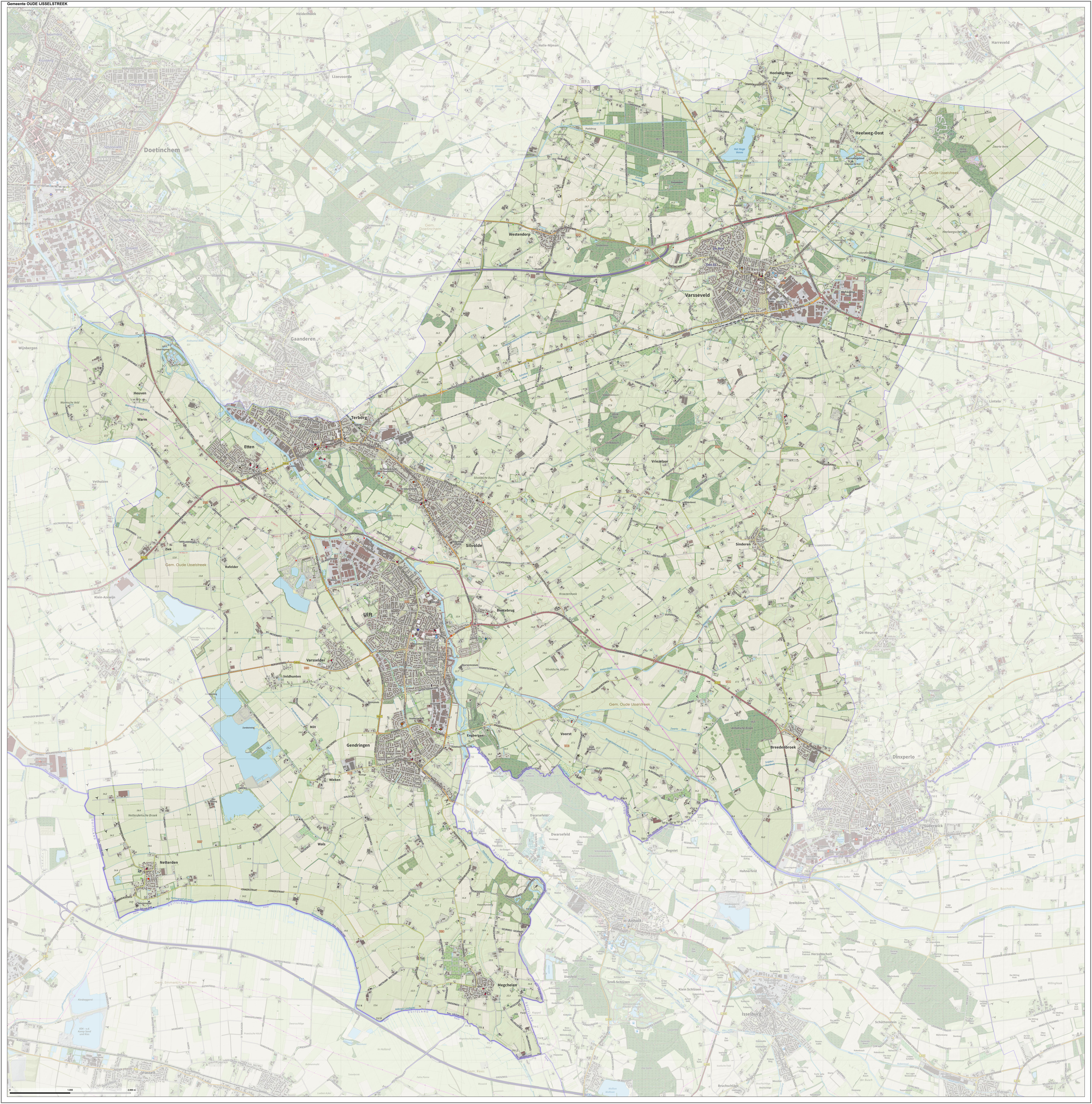
Map of the municipality of Oude IJsselstreek, June 2015

== Culture ==
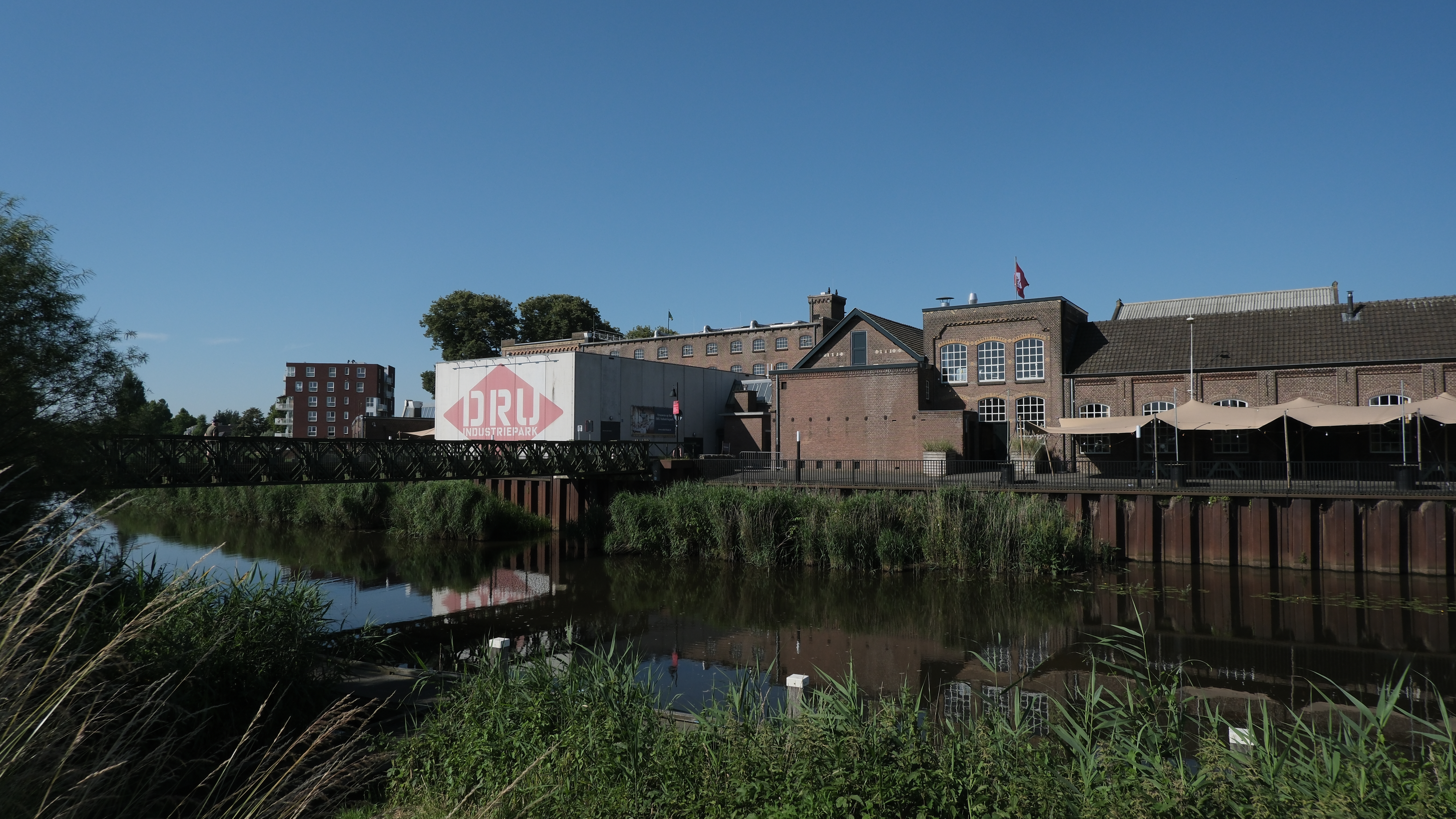
Former DRU factory, at the river Oude IJssel, now known as the DRU Industriepark

Although a mainly rural municipality, iron ore has been mined and processed here. DRU (Diepenbrock en Reigers te Ulft) was the largest of several enterprises, it closed in Ulft in 2003. Since 2009, the former DRU factory is a cultural centre named DRU Industriepark that houses the local library of Ulft, a theater, a regional centre for vocational education and other facilities. Municipal council meetings take place in its conference room.

== International affairs ==
Oude IJsselstreek is a member of the Ring of the European Cities of Iron Works and hosted the annual convention of 2010.

== Notable people ==
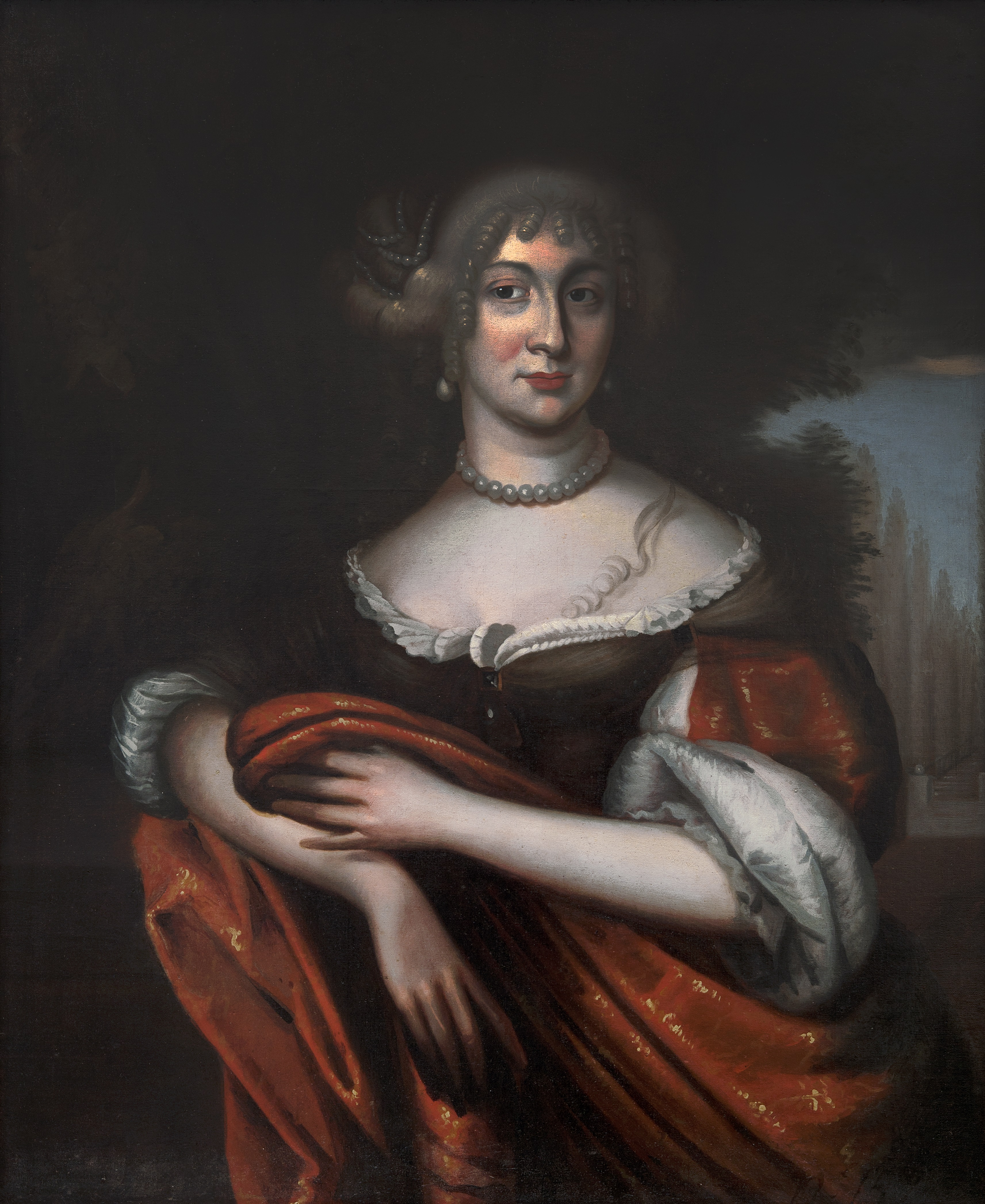
Countess Sophie Amalie of Nassau-Siegen was born in Wisch, now Terborg, Oude IJsselstreek.

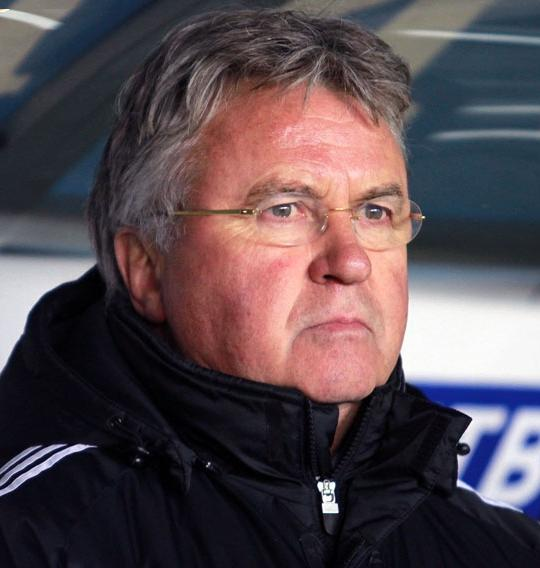
Footballer and football coach Guus Hiddink was born in Varsseveld

=== Other ===
- Frederik van den Bergh (1559 in Ulft – 1618), a soldier in the Eighty Years' War
- William Maurice, Prince of Nassau-Siegen (born 1649 in Terborg – 1691), aristocrat and former Count of Nassau-Siegen
- Countess Sophie Amalie of Nassau-Siegen (born 1650 in Terborg – 1688), aristocrat and later by marriage Duchess consort of Courland
- Hendrik Jan Elhorst (1861 in Wisch – 1924), Mennonite teacher and minister
- Willem Berkhoff (1863 in Varsseveld – 1953), pastry chef
- Henry Eric Maudslay (1921 – 1943 near Klein-Netterden), pilot with No. 617 Squadron, Royal Air Force (RAF)

=== Sport ===
- Johannes van der Vegte (1892 in Gendringen – 1945), rower, competed at the 1920 Summer Olympics
- Herman Suselbeek (born 1943 in Silvolde), retired rower, silver medallist at the 1968 Summer Olympics
- Henk Overgoor (born in 1944 in Gendringen – 2020), former footballer
- Guus Hiddink (born 1946 in Varsseveld), football manager and former player with over 300 club caps
- Hans Westerhof (born 1948 in Terborg), football coach
- René Hiddink (born 1955 in Heerenveen, grew up in Varsseveld), football coach
- Mile Pajic (born 1955 in Terborg), retired motorcycle racist
- Bram Schmitz (born 1977 in Terborg), retired cyclist
- Bram Som (born 1980 in Terborg), 800 metres runner, participated in the 2000 and 2004 Summer Olympics
- Sjoerd Ars (born 1984 in Terborg), retired Dutch footballer with over 400 club caps
- Robert Gesink (born 1986 in Varsseveld), cyclist
- Lonneke Slöetjes (born 1990 in Varsseveld), volleyball player
- Koen Bouwman (born 1993 in Ulft), cyclist
- Jurre Vreman (born 1998 in Gendringen), footballer
- Dione Housheer (born 1999 in Gendringen), handballer

== Gallery ==
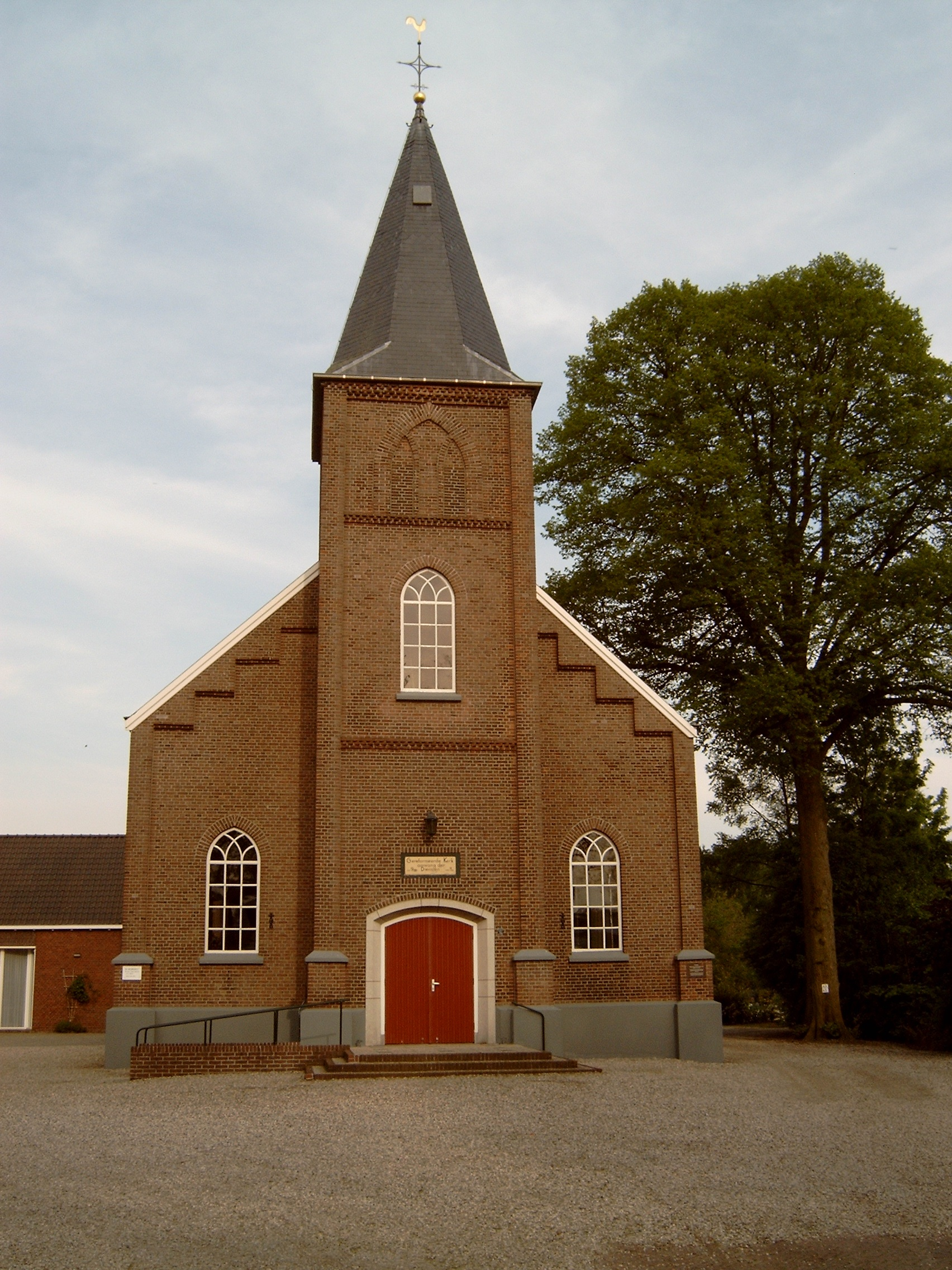
Keurhosterkerk in Sinderen.

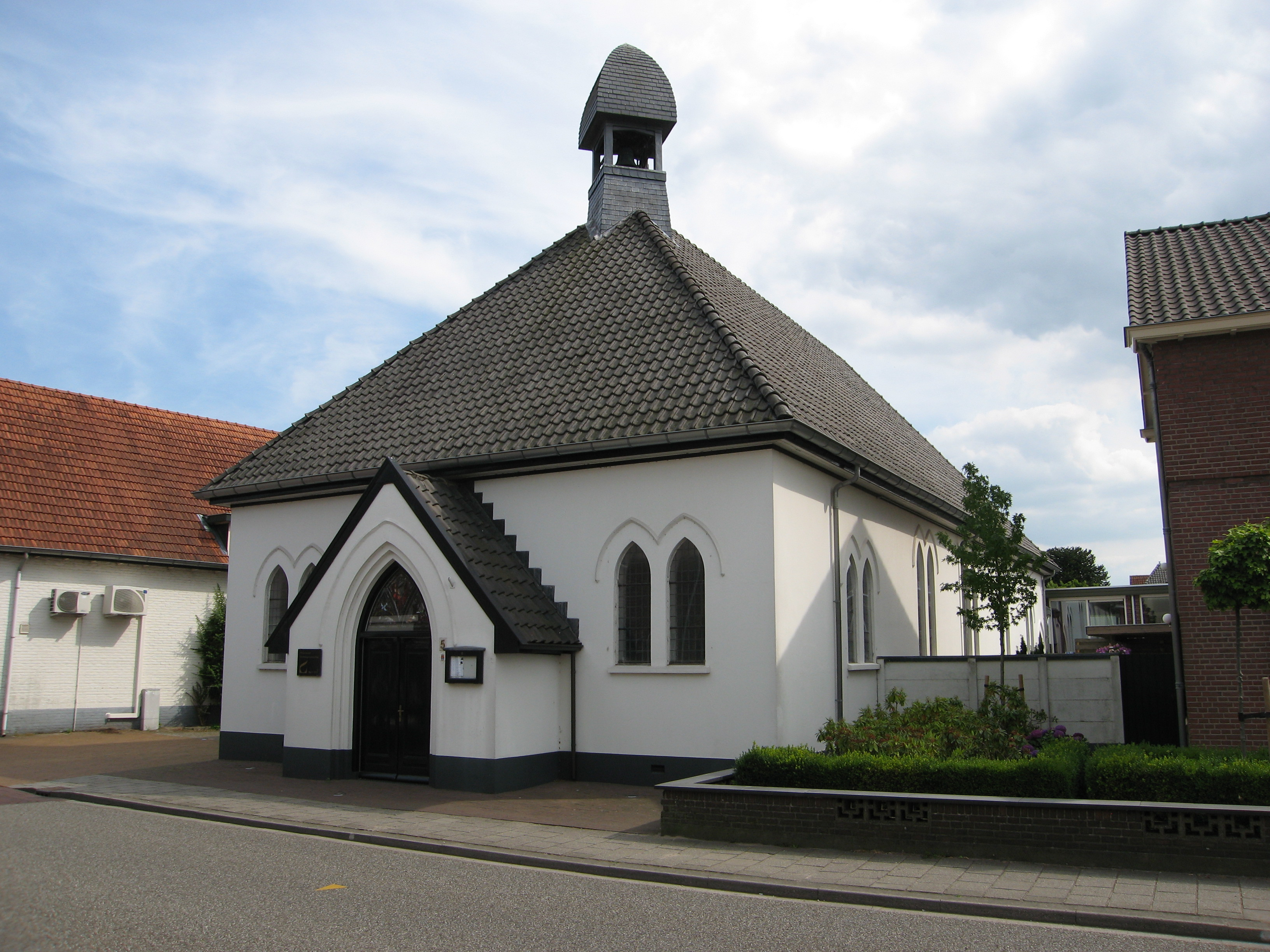
Witte Kerkje in Varsseveld.

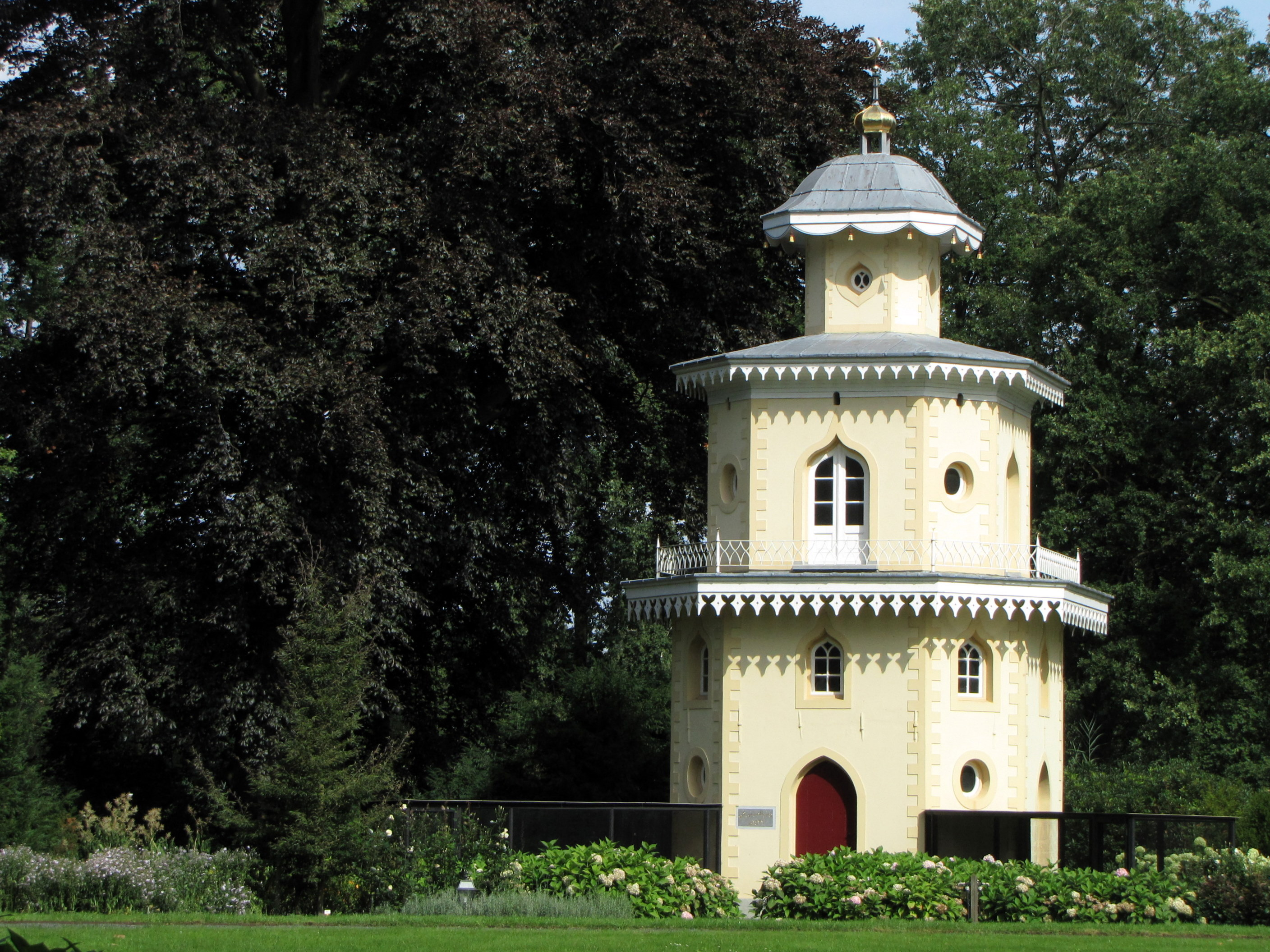
Landfort in Megchelen.

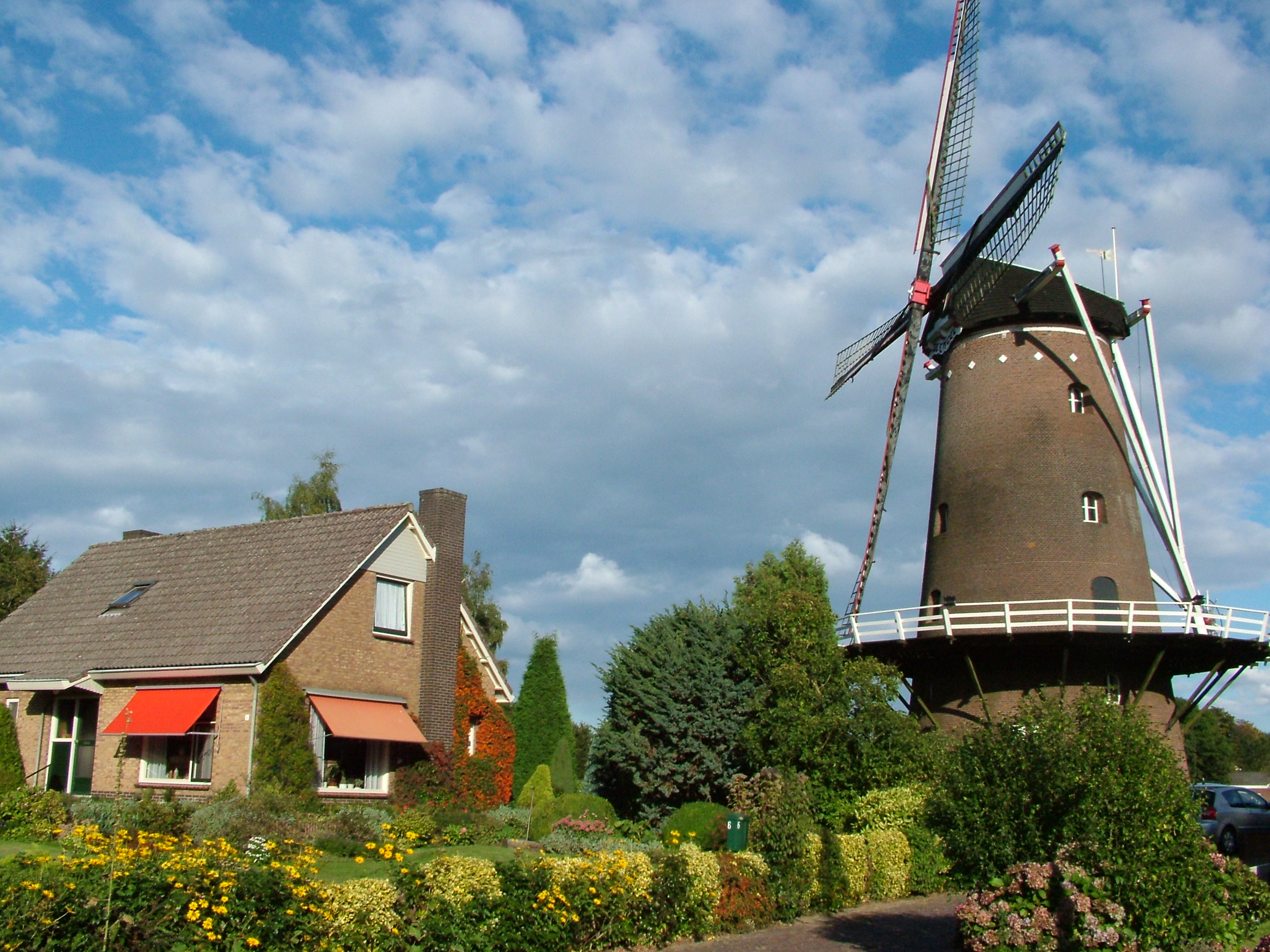
Mill De Engel in Varsseveld.

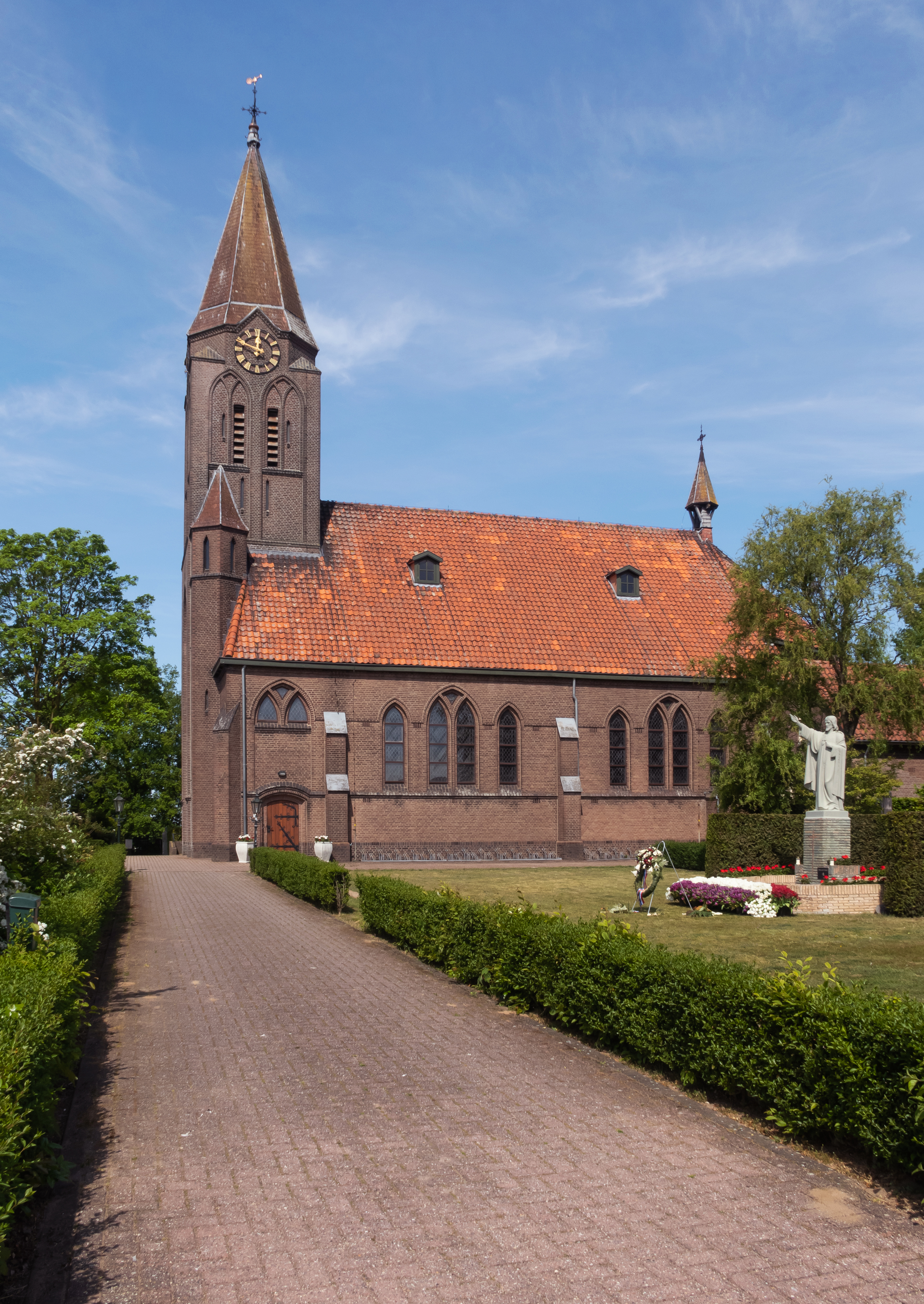
Church in Varssevelder

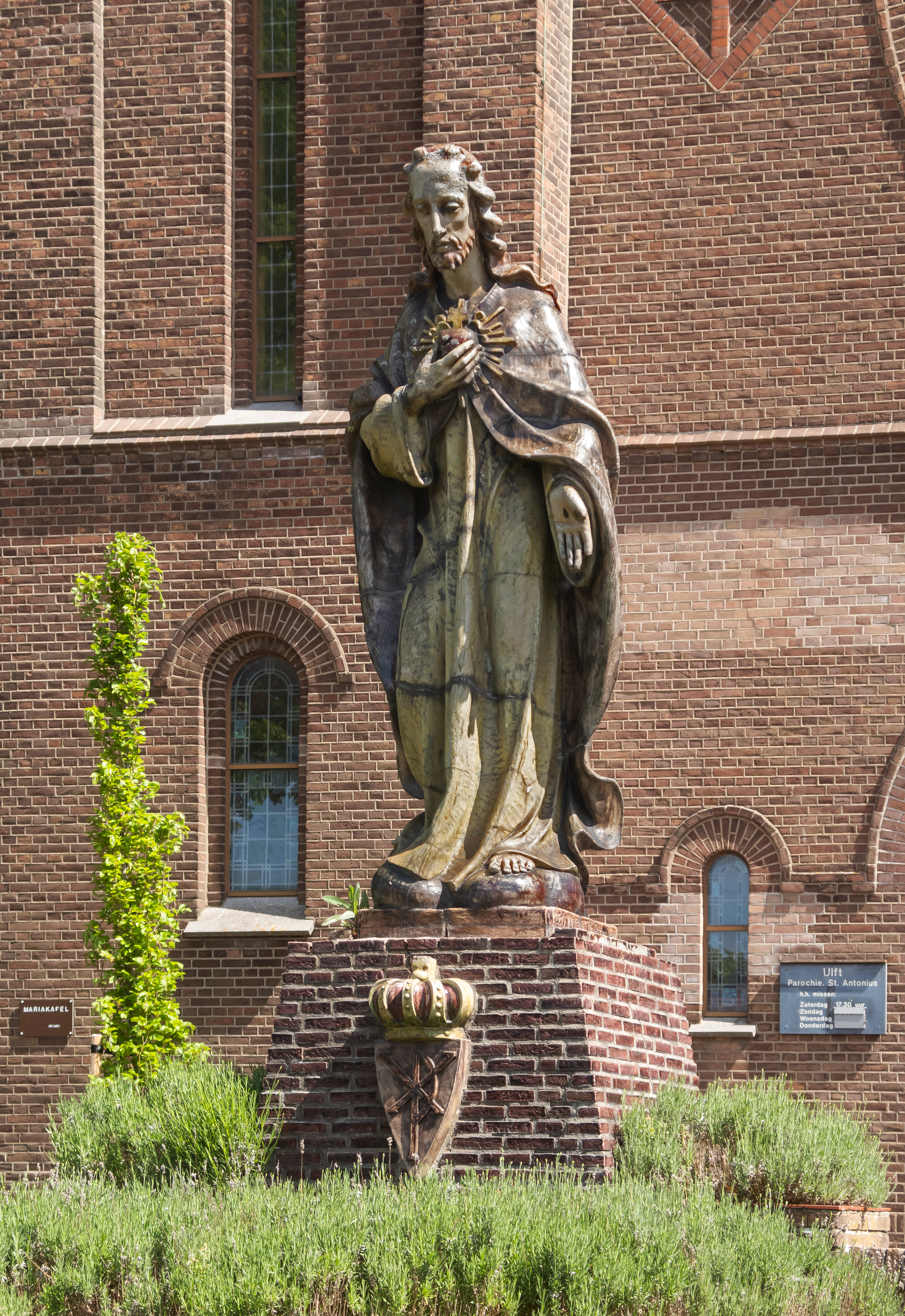
Statue in Ulft

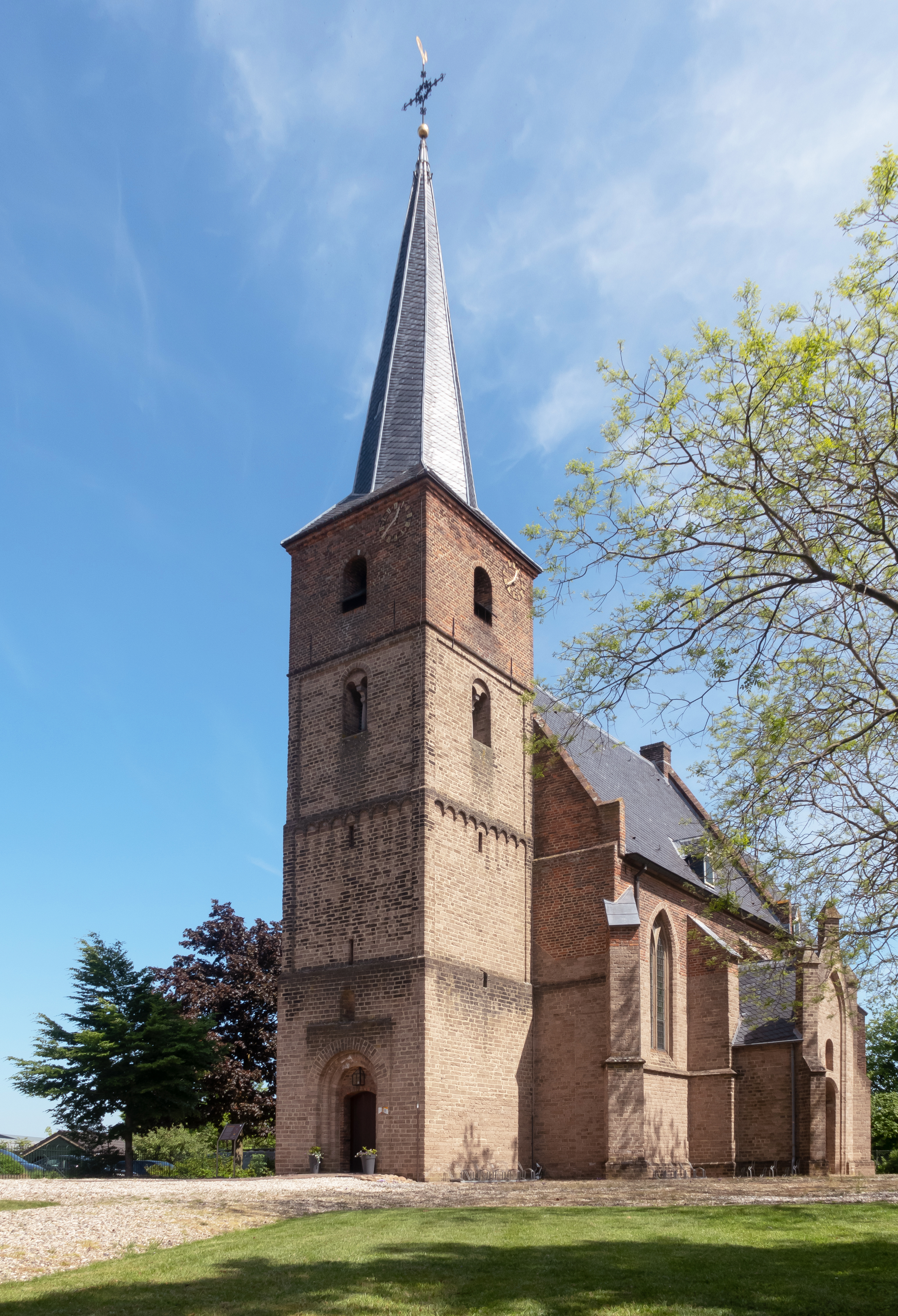
Church in Etten

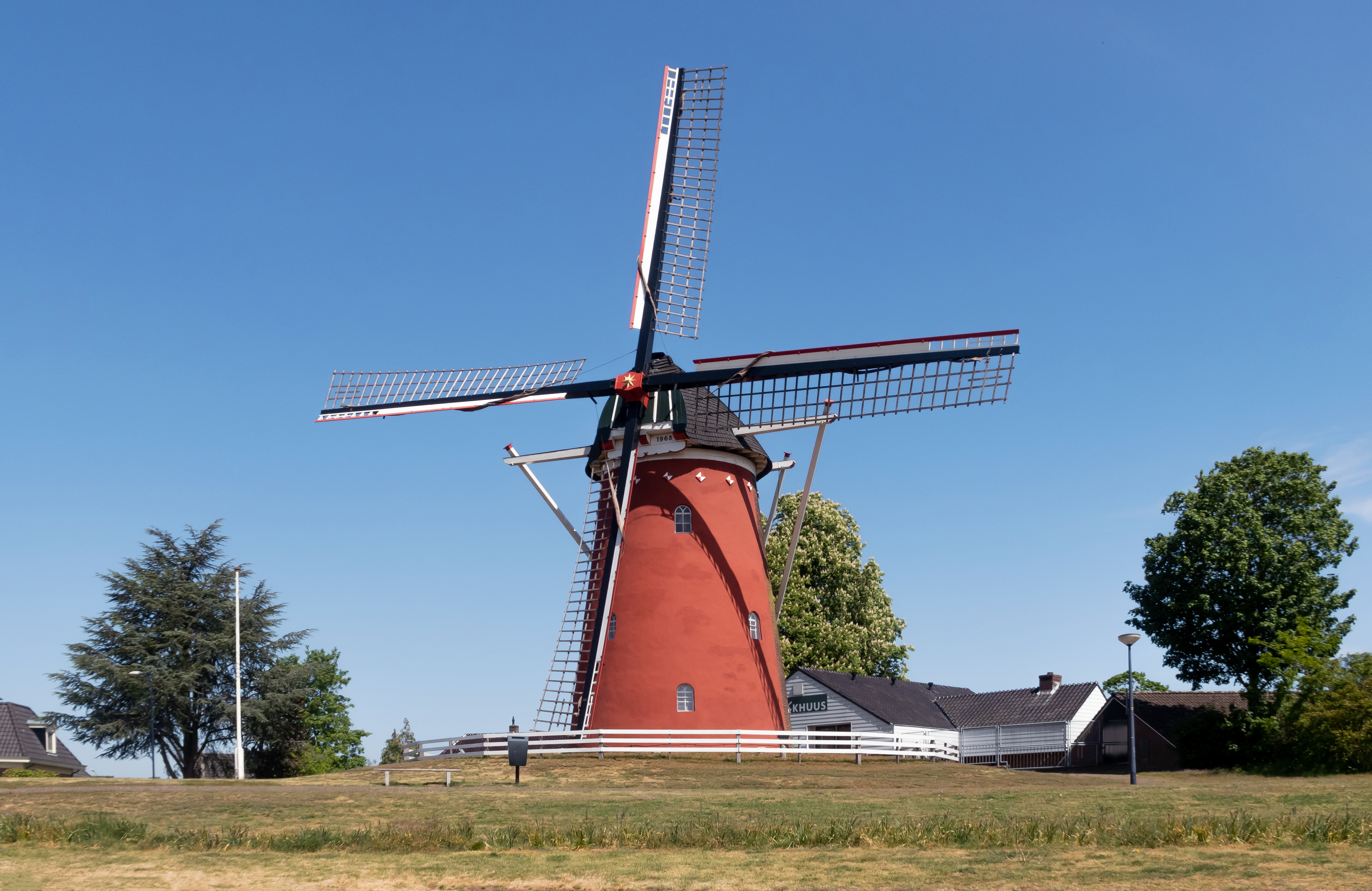
Windmill in Silvolde
