= Steven de Vreeze =

Dutch politician

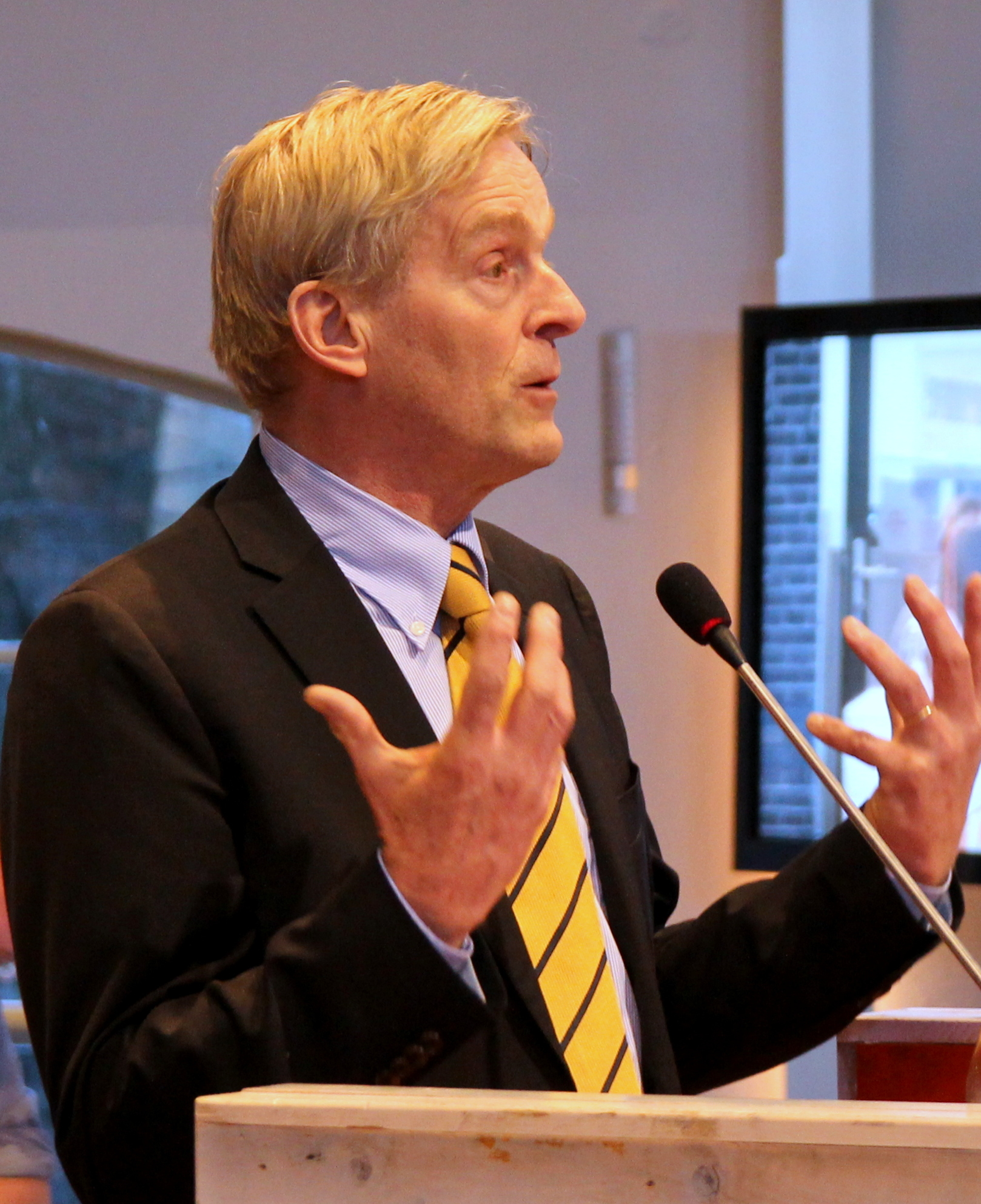
Addressing the municipality council of Oude IJsselstreek, April 2015

Steven Pieter Marie de Vreeze (born 23 September 1951 in Utrecht) is a Dutch politician of the Labour Party, later Progressief Nederland. He served as a municipal councillor for Leiden from 1984 to 1995, and alderman from 1991 to 1994. He served as mayor of Enkhuizen from 1995 to 2003, and mayor of Tiel from 2003 to 2012. He also served as acting mayor on two occasions: for Lingewaard from 2012 to 2013 and for Oude IJsselstreek from 2015 to 2016.
