= Ulft =

- Village
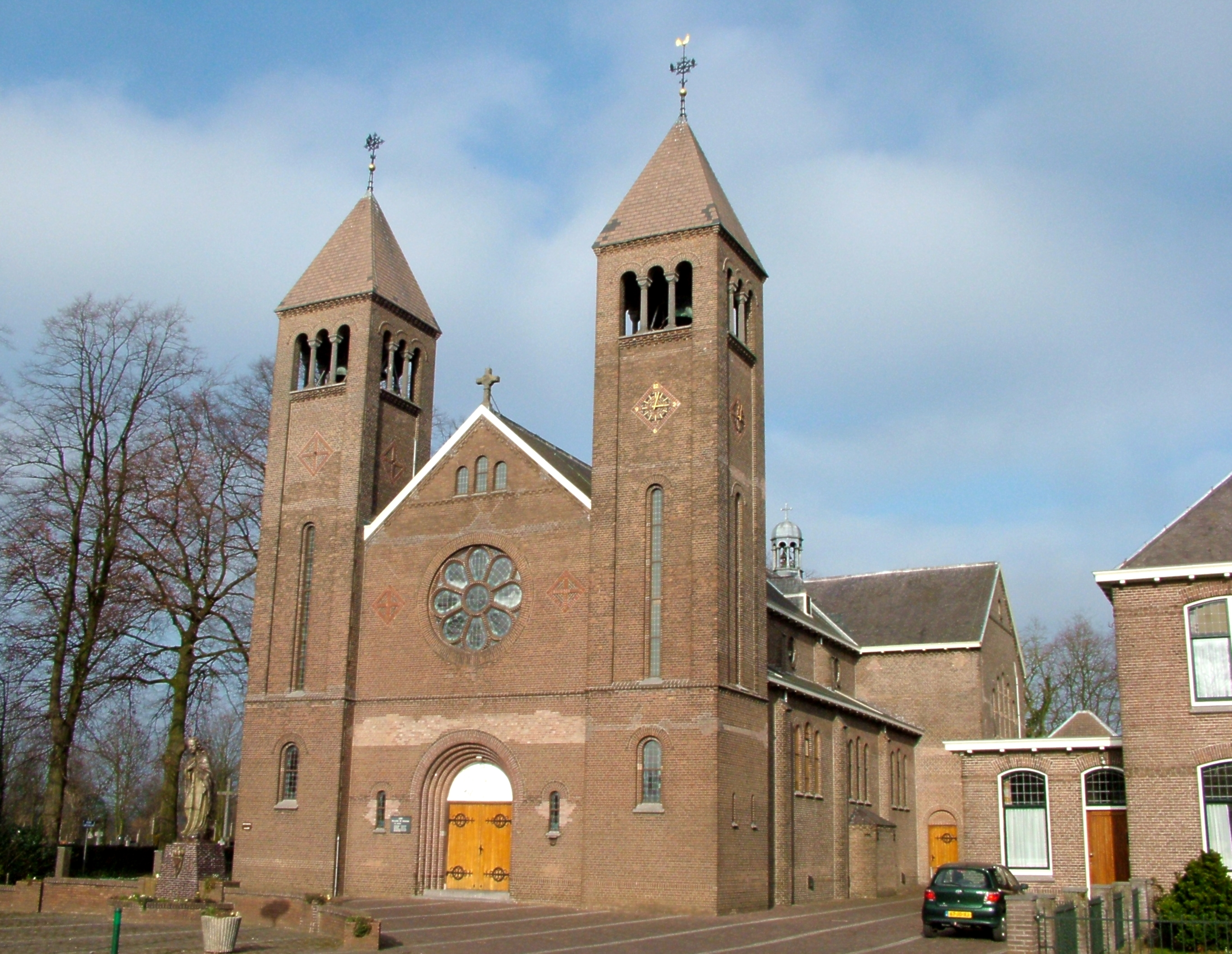
- Antonius Church

- Coat of arms

- Location in the province of Gelderland in the Netherlands Ulft (Netherlands)
- Coordinates: 51°53′27″N 6°22′47″E
- Country: Netherlands
- Province: Gelderland
- Municipality: Oude IJsselstreek

Area
  - Total: 2.99 km^{2} (1.15 sq mi)
- Elevation: 15 m (49 ft)

Population (2021)
  - Total: 10,025
  - Density: 3,350/km^{2} (8,680/sq mi)
- Time zone: UTC+1 (CET)
  - Summer (DST): UTC+2 (CEST)
- Postal code: 7071
- Dialing code: 0315

Ulft (Dutch pronunciation: [ˈʏl(ə)ft]) is a town in Oude IJsselstreek in the Achterhoek area in the province of Gelderland, Netherlands.

The town has over 10,000 inhabitants and is the biggest town in the municipality Oude IJsselstreek. Until 1 January 2005, Ulft was part of the municipality Gendringen. At the municipal re-ordering in the Achterhoek, the municipalities Gendringen and Wisch joined to form the Oude IJsselstreek.

Ulft developed out of three hamlets: Ulft, Oer and De Pol. Oer is the northern part of Ulft and is called Oer because of the iron in the earth, which is called IJzeroer in Dutch. In Ulft an iron foundry called "Diepenbrock en Reigers te Ulft" (DRU) was founded. DRU moved some years ago to Duiven and is now located at Rijksweg A12. The old DRU-building now is the DRU 'Culture Factory' and holds a library, a theatre, a restaurant and an Iron museum.

== Geography ==
Ulft lies in the southern part of the Achterhoek, at a distance of 15 km from Doetinchem. The Industry Grounds "De Rieze" are located in the northern part of Ulft. It has been expanded lately, and some farms have been overtaken to allow this to happen. The Industry Grounds "De Pol" were finished about 2007. After that new residents plan to move in. The Industry Grounds "De IJsselweide" are located between Ulft and the bordering Gendringen. The de main street of Ulft was rebuilt in 2001. The idea was to avoid the heavy trucks in the centre of Ulft and route them around. This was done by building traffic thresholds and some trees have been planted next to the road. Bus company "Syntus" said they wouldn't drive their buses through the centre any longer because the thresholds might damage their buses.

== History ==
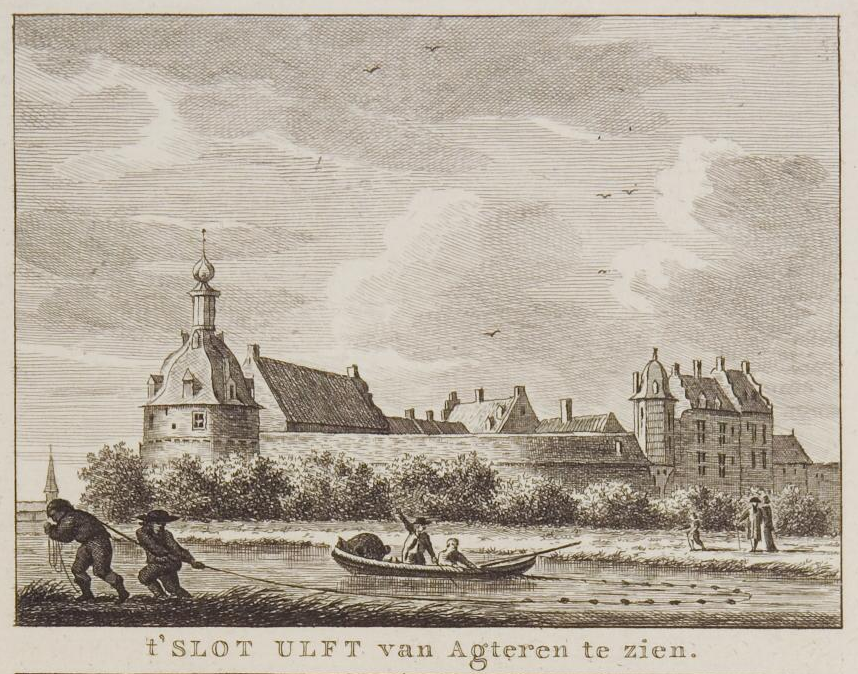
Castle of Ulft

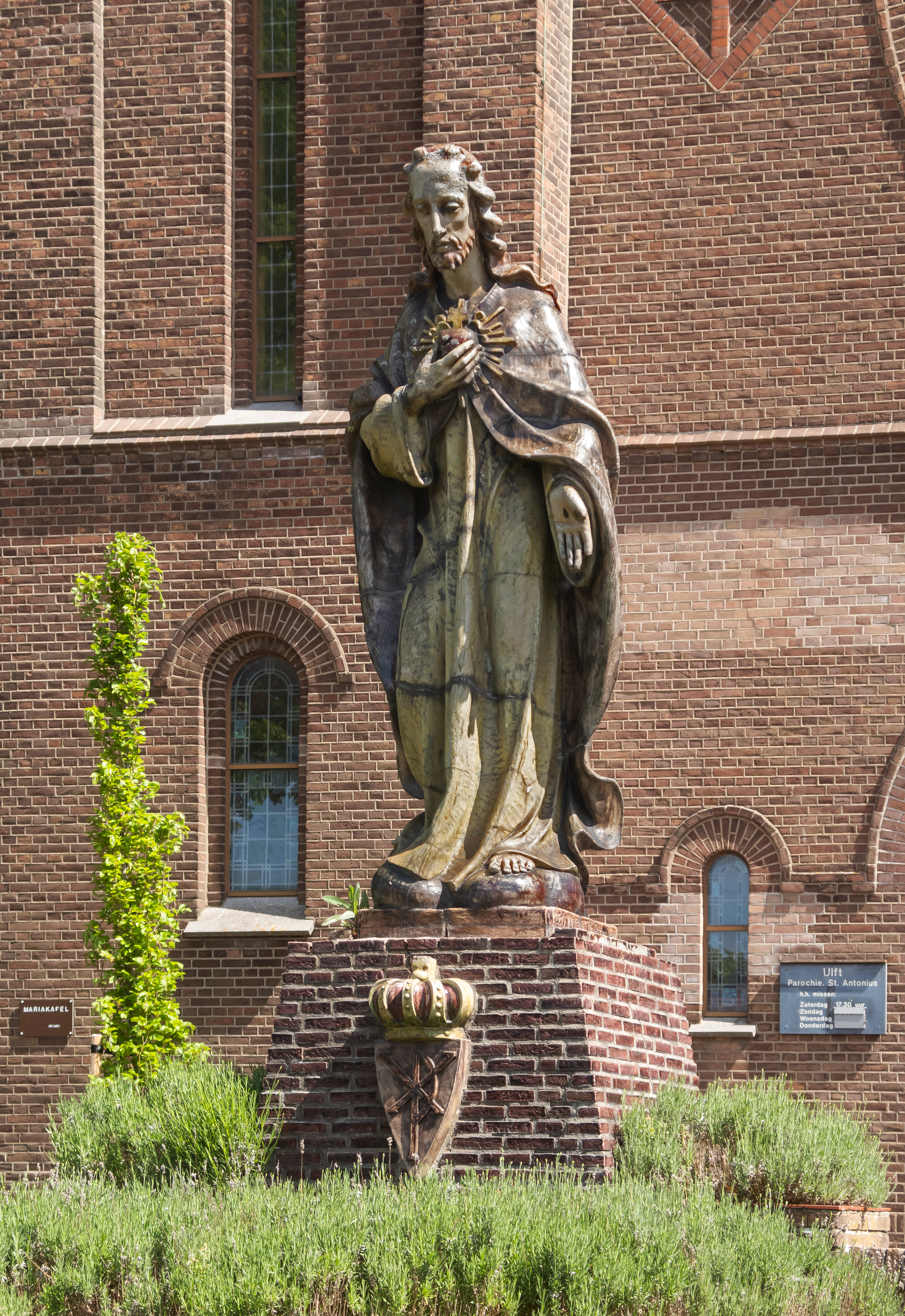
Sacred Heart statue in front of the church (Antonius van Paduakerk)

The history of Ulft began in 1236 with a citadel: Slot Ulft that doesn't exist anymore. The water citadel was located at the “Oude IJssel” and the “AA-strang”. The citadel had a watermill, which was used as cornmill. At the end of the 16th century Ulft began to develop as a town, and began its expansion to its current size.

Important for the development of Ulft was the presence of the river “Oude IJssel” and the deposits of iron ore (IJzeroer), that were easy to dig. The ore had an adverse effect on the plant growth in the region, which was a major problem for the farming based community at the time. However, in 1753 Mr. Bogel, Mr. Henning, Earl Van Den Bergh and his counselor Roukens signed an agreement to begin an iron forge in the old water tower. With the foundation of the "Ironhut" in 1754, they laid the foundations for one of the first iron plants in the Netherlands, long before the regional arrival of the industrial revolution. Because of the money that was made out of the ore, the village flourished and the farmers were freed of their iron-problem.

In 1885 “Bellaard, Becking and Bongers” started a second iron forge. This forge was called “The new hut” by the locals. The increasing production of the iron forges also attracted more entrepreneurs, mainly from the metal industry.

Although all of the iron factories eventually left the town or went bankrupt, the "ironhut" (better known as DRU) only moved out in 1999. In the village there are still numerous references to the company, among which is the cultural heritage that is still largely intact.

== Village Fair ==
On the second Sunday of July the Village fair of Ulft is celebrated. The Village fair is organized by 3 associations. “De Eendracht”, “St. Hubertus” and “St. Joris”. De Eendracht organises the Village fair in Oer, St. Hubertus in Ulft (centre) and St. Joris in the Pol.

== Sports ==
In Ulft there are 2 football clubs. These are “Ulftse Boys”, which is situated in the old part of Ulft (called “Oer” bij the locals), and “SDOUC” (which stands for Teamwork leads to victory), which is located in the southern part of Ulft. “Ulftse Boys” has degraded to the 4th class, their big rival has degraded to the second class in 2007.

Ulft also has a swimming pool called “The Blenk” with a swimming association “De Gendten”. Handball, Volleyball, Korfball, Tennis, Badminton and athletics can be found at sporting park “IJsselweide”. This park is being shared by Ulft and Gendringen. Also the football clubs SDOUC and V.V. Gendringen can be found there. Atletico ’73 is well-known of the athletes Bram Som and Arnoud Okken.
