= Omloop der Kempen =

Bicycle race in Veldhoven, the Netherlands

Race details
- Date: May
- Region: Veldhoven, Netherlands
- Local name: Omloop der Kempen (in Dutch)
- Discipline: Road race
- Web site: www.omloopderkempen.nl

History
- First edition: Men: 1948; Women: 1997
- Editions: Men: 76 (as of 2025); Women: 28 (as of 2025)
- First winner: Men; Arie Geluk (NED); Women; Inge Velthuis (NED)
- Most wins: Men; Anthony Theus (NED) (4 wins); Women; Leontien van Moorsel (NED) (4 wins)
- Most recent: Men; Gustav Frederik Dahl (DEN); Women; Lorena Wiebes (NED)

Omloop der Kempen is an elite men's and women's professional road bicycle racing event held annually in Veldhoven, Netherlands. From 2005 to 2014, the men's event was held as a UCI 1.2 rated event on the UCI Europe Tour. In 2015, the race was moved to the national calendar. Since 1997 there is also a women's event. The women's race also had the names GP Van der Heijden and GP Sankomij Veldhoven.

== Honours ==
=== Men ===
Year	Winner	Second	Third
1948	(Netherlands) Arie Geluk	(Netherlands) Co Geerts	(Netherlands) Wil van der Stappen
1949	(Netherlands) Hans Dekkers	(Netherlands) Rien van der Veecken	(Netherlands) Giel Hendrix
1950	no race		
1951	(Netherlands) Wim Snijders	(Netherlands) Jules Maenen	(Netherlands) Jo Hendriks
1952	(Netherlands) Tini Cuyten	(Netherlands) Gerrit van der Sluijs	(Netherlands) Tiny Wolfs
1953	(Netherlands) Piet van de Brekel	(Netherlands) Tiny Wolfs	(Netherlands) Arend Van 't Hof
1954	(Netherlands) Daan de Groot	(Netherlands) Jaap Kersten	(Netherlands) Henk van de Broek
1955	(Netherlands) Adrie van Steenselen	(Netherlands) Michel Stolker	(Netherlands) Piet van Est
1956	(Netherlands) Geurt Pos	(Netherlands) Jan van Vliet	(Netherlands) Arie van Wetten
1957	(Netherlands) Jo de Roo	(Netherlands) Harry Ehlen	(Netherlands) Ab van Egmond
1958	(Netherlands) René Lotz	(Netherlands) Antoon van der Steen	(Netherlands) Coen Niesten
1959	(Netherlands) Bas Maliepaard	(Netherlands) Antoon van der Steen	(Netherlands) Dick Enthoven
1960	(Netherlands) Cees Lute	(Netherlands) René Lotz	(Netherlands) Nico Walravens
1961	(Netherlands) Jan Schröder	(Netherlands) Henk Nijdam	(Netherlands) Ad Biemans
1962	(Netherlands) Cees Lute	(Netherlands) Cor Schuuring	(Netherlands) Gerben Karstens
1963	(Netherlands) Arie den Hartog	(Netherlands) Bart Zoet	(Netherlands) Gerben Karstens
1964	(Netherlands) André Van Middelkoop	(Netherlands) Henk Cornelisse	(Netherlands) Harry Steevens
1965	(Netherlands) Harry Steevens	(Netherlands) Hans Hesen	(Netherlands) Piet Tesselaar
1966	(Netherlands) Wim Dubois	(Netherlands) Gerard Koel	(Netherlands) Harry Schoofs
1967	(Netherlands) Leo Duyndam	(Netherlands) Rini Wagtmans	(Netherlands) Cees Rentmeester
1968	(Netherlands) Jan Krekels	(Netherlands) Mathieu Gerrits	(Netherlands) Joop Zoetemelk
1969	(Netherlands) Jan Aling	(Netherlands) Harrie Jansen	(Netherlands) Fedor den Hertog
1970	(Netherlands) Fedor den Hertog	(Netherlands) Peter van den Donk	(Netherlands) Jan Aldershof
1971	(Netherlands) Arie Hassink	(Netherlands) Karel Delnoy	(Netherlands) Jan Adriaans
1972	(Netherlands) Jan Spetgens	(Netherlands) Hennie Kuiper	(Netherlands) Bert Broere
1973	(Netherlands) Jan Aling	(Netherlands) Fons van Katwijk	(Netherlands) Frits Schur
1974	(Netherlands) Piet van der Kruijs	(Netherlands) Henk Mutsaars	(Netherlands) Gerard Tabak
1975	(Netherlands) Hans Koot	(Netherlands) Lou Verwey	(Netherlands) Tonny Huyzen
1976	(Netherlands) Arie Hassink	(Netherlands) Cor Tuit	(Netherlands) Anton van der Steen
1977	(Netherlands) Léo van Vliet	(Netherlands) Piet van der Kruijs	(Netherlands) Arie Hassink
1978	(Netherlands) Pim Bosch	(Netherlands) Hans Plugers	(Netherlands) Tony Gruijters
1979	(Netherlands) Jacques van Meer	(Netherlands) Peter Damen	(Netherlands) Wies van Dongen
1980	(Netherlands) Ad Wijnands	(Netherlands) Jacques Hanegraaf	(Netherlands) Henk Mutsaars
1981	(Netherlands) Frank Moons	(Netherlands) Hans Koot	(Netherlands) Peter Hofland
1982	(Netherlands) Henk Bouwman	(Netherlands) Jean-Paul van Poppel	(Netherlands) Frank Moons
1983	(Netherlands) Peter Hofland	(Netherlands) Karel van Goethem	(Netherlands) Wim Meijer
1984	(Netherlands) Jean-Paul van Poppel	(Netherlands) Chris Koppert	(Netherlands) Dries Klein
1985	(Netherlands) John Bogers	(Netherlands) Michel Cornelisse	(Netherlands) Jan van Dalen
1986	(Netherlands) John van den Akker	(Netherlands) Frank Pirard	(Netherlands) Daan Luykx
1987	(Netherlands) Théo Akkermans	(Netherlands) John van den Akker	(Netherlands) Jan Burgmans
1988	(Netherlands) Eric Venema	(Netherlands) Patrick Rasch	(Netherlands) Eric Knuvers
1989	(Netherlands) Anthony Theus	(Netherlands) Patrick Rasch	(Netherlands) Erik Cent
1990	(Netherlands) Patrick Strouken	(Netherlands) Rob Mulders	(Netherlands) Bart Voskamp
1991	(Netherlands) Rob Mulders	(Netherlands) Rik Rutgers	(Netherlands) Johan Melsen
1992	(Netherlands) John den Braber	(Netherlands) Marcel van der Vliet	(Netherlands) Erik Dekker
1993	(Netherlands) Harm Jansen	(Netherlands) Raymond Thebes	(Netherlands) Gerard Kemper
1994	(Netherlands) Anthony Theus	(Netherlands) Rob Compask	(Netherlands) Carl Roes
1995	(Netherlands) Anthony Theus	(Netherlands) Steven de Jongh	(Netherlands) John den Braber
1996	(Netherlands) Bennie Gosink	(Netherlands) Erik De Crom	(Netherlands) Anthony Theus
1997	(Netherlands) Rudi Kemna	(Netherlands) Wilco Zuyderwijk	(Netherlands) Johan Bruinsma
1998	(Germany) Christian Wegmann	(Australia) Mathew Hayman	(Netherlands) Martin van Steen
1999	(Belgium) Wim Omloop	(Germany) Ralph Schweda	(Australia) Mathew Hayman
2000	(Netherlands) Anthony Theus	(Estonia) Peep Mikli	(Netherlands) Mark Vlijm
2001	(Belgium) Eric De Clercq	(Netherlands) Angelo van Melis	(Estonia) Peep Mikli
2002	(Netherlands) Mark Vlijm	(Netherlands) Rik Reinerink	(Netherlands) Bjorn Cornelissen
2003	(Netherlands) Alain van Katwijk	(Netherlands) Paul Van Schalen	(Netherlands) Julien Smink
2004	(Netherlands) Marvin van der Pluijm	(Belgium) Wouter Van Mechelen	(Netherlands) Joost van Leijen
2005	(Netherlands) Niki Terpstra	(Netherlands) Sebastiaan Langeveld	(Netherlands) Laurens ten Dam
2006	(Russia) Evgenij Popov	(Netherlands) Alain van Katwijk	(Denmark) Michael Berling
2007	(Netherlands) Lars Boom	(Netherlands) Bobbie Traksel	(Estonia) Janek Tombak
2008	(Netherlands) Job Vissers	(Netherlands) Bram Schmitz	(Belgium) Michael Van Staeyen
2009	(Netherlands) Theo Bos	(Netherlands) Ger Soepenberg	(Netherlands) Stefan van Dijk
2010	(Netherlands) Stefan van Dijk	(Netherlands) Coen Vermeltfoort	(Belgium) Nicky Cocquyt
2011	(Netherlands) Jos Pronk	(Netherlands) Jetse Bol	(Netherlands) Wesley Kreder
2012	(Belgium) Niko Eeckhout	(Lithuania) Gediminas Bagdonas	(Netherlands) Yoeri Havik
2013	(Italy) Eugenio Alafaci	(Netherlands) Steven Lammertink	(Netherlands) Rens te Stroet
2014	(Australia) Luke Davison	(Netherlands) Sjors Roosen	(Netherlands) Mike Teunissen
2015	(Netherlands) Jochem Hoekstra	(Netherlands) Yoeri Havik	(Netherlands) Koos Jeroen Kers
2016	(Netherlands) Oscar Riesebeek	(Netherlands) Jasper de Laat	(Netherlands) Dion Beukeboom
2017	(Netherlands) Tim Kerkhof	(Netherlands) Dylan Bouwmans	(Netherlands) Robbert de Greef
2018	(Netherlands) Daan van Sintmaartensdijk	(Netherlands) Tim Kerkhof	(Netherlands) Chiel Breukelman
2019	(Netherlands) René Hooghiemster	(Netherlands) Bas van der Kooij	(Netherlands) Wim Stroetinga
2020	Cancelled		
2021	(Netherlands) Roy Eefting	(Netherlands) Coen Vermeltfoort	(Belgium) Jules Hesters
2022	(Netherlands) Roel van Sintmaartensdijk	(Netherlands) Arne Peters	(Netherlands) Daan van Sintmaartensdijk
2023	(Netherlands) Coen Vermeltfoort	(Netherlands) Jesper Rasch	(United States) Brody McDonald
2024	(Netherlands) Martijn Rasenberg	(Belgium) Brent Cle	(Netherlands) Hidde van Veenendaal
2025	(Belgium) Arne Santy	(Netherlands) Roy Hoogendoorn	(Australia) Blake Agnoletto
2026	(Denmark) Gustav Frederik Dahl	(Netherlands) Simon den Braber	(Denmark) Lukas Toftemark

=== Women ===
Year	Winner	Second	Third
Omloop der Kempen
1997	(Netherlands) Inge Velthuis	(Netherlands) Leontien van Moorsel	(Netherlands) Nicole Vermast
1998	(Netherlands) Leontien van Moorsel	(Netherlands) Martine Bras	(Netherlands) Angela van Smoorenburg
GP Van der Heijden
1999	(Netherlands) Leontien van Moorsel	(Netherlands) Edith Klep-Moerenhout	(Netherlands) Debby Mansveld
2000	(Netherlands) Leontien van Moorsel	(Netherlands) Sissy van Alebeek	(Netherlands) Edith Klep-Moerenhout
2001	(New Zealand) Kirsty Nicole Robb	(Germany) Tanja Hennes-Schmidt	(Netherlands) Sharon van Essen
2002	(Netherlands) Josephine Groenveld	(Netherlands) Andrea Bosman	(Netherlands) Sandra Oosterbosch
2003	(Netherlands) Bertine Spijkerman	(Netherlands) Debby Mansveld	(Netherlands) Sissy van Alebeek
2004	(Netherlands) Leontien van Moorsel	(Netherlands) Ghita Beltman	(Netherlands) Suzanne de Goede
GP Sankomij Veldhoven
2005	(Netherlands) Kristy Miggels	(Netherlands) Adrie Visser	(Netherlands) Francis Linthorst
2006	(New Zealand) Linda Villumsen	(Germany) Sandra Missbach	(Netherlands) Kirsten Wild
2007	(Netherlands) Suzanne de Goede	(Netherlands) Claudia Witteveen	(Netherlands) Sissy van Alebeek
2008	(Netherlands) Iris Slappendel	(Netherlands) Marianne Vos	(Netherlands) Ellen van Dijk
2009	(Australia) Chloe Hosking	(Netherlands) Danielle Lissenberg-Bekkering	(Netherlands) Elise van Hage
2010	(Netherlands) Marianne Vos	(Netherlands) Chantal Blaak	(Netherlands) Suzanne de Goede
Omloop der Kempen
2011	(Netherlands) Marianne Vos	(Netherlands) Suzanne de Goede	(Netherlands) Vera Koedooder
2012	(Netherlands) Suzanne de Goede	(Netherlands) Nina Kessler	(Germany) Sarah Düster
Grote Prijs Groenen Groep
2013	(Netherlands) Annemiek van Vleuten	(Netherlands) Amy Pieters	(Netherlands) Thalita de Jong
2014	(Belgium) Maaike Polspoel	(Netherlands) Amy Pieters	(Netherlands) Nina Kessler
Omloop der Kempen
2015	(Netherlands) Ashlyn van Baarle		
2016	(Netherlands) Esther van Veen		
2017	(Netherlands) Marjolein van 't Geloof		
2018	(Netherlands) Winanda Spoor		
2019	(Netherlands) Lorena Wiebes		
2020	Not held due to Covid-19		
2021	(Netherlands) Maike van der Duin	(Netherlands) Marjolein van't Geloof	(Netherlands) Lieke Nooijen
2022	(Italy) Rachele Barbieri	(Netherlands) Sofie van Rooijen	(Netherlands) Nina Kessler
2023	(Netherlands) Charlotte Kool	(Poland) Daria Pikulik	(Netherlands) Maike van der Duin
2024	(Italy) Sara Fiorin	(Republic of Ireland) Lara Gillespie	(Netherlands) Marjolein van 't Geloof
2025	(United Kingdom) April Tacey	(Netherlands) Nienke Veenhoven	(France) Valentine Fortin
2026	(Netherlands) Lorena Wiebes	(Netherlands) Charlotte Kool	(Belgium) Sandrine Tas
