= Bram Schmitz =

Dutch cyclist (born 1977)

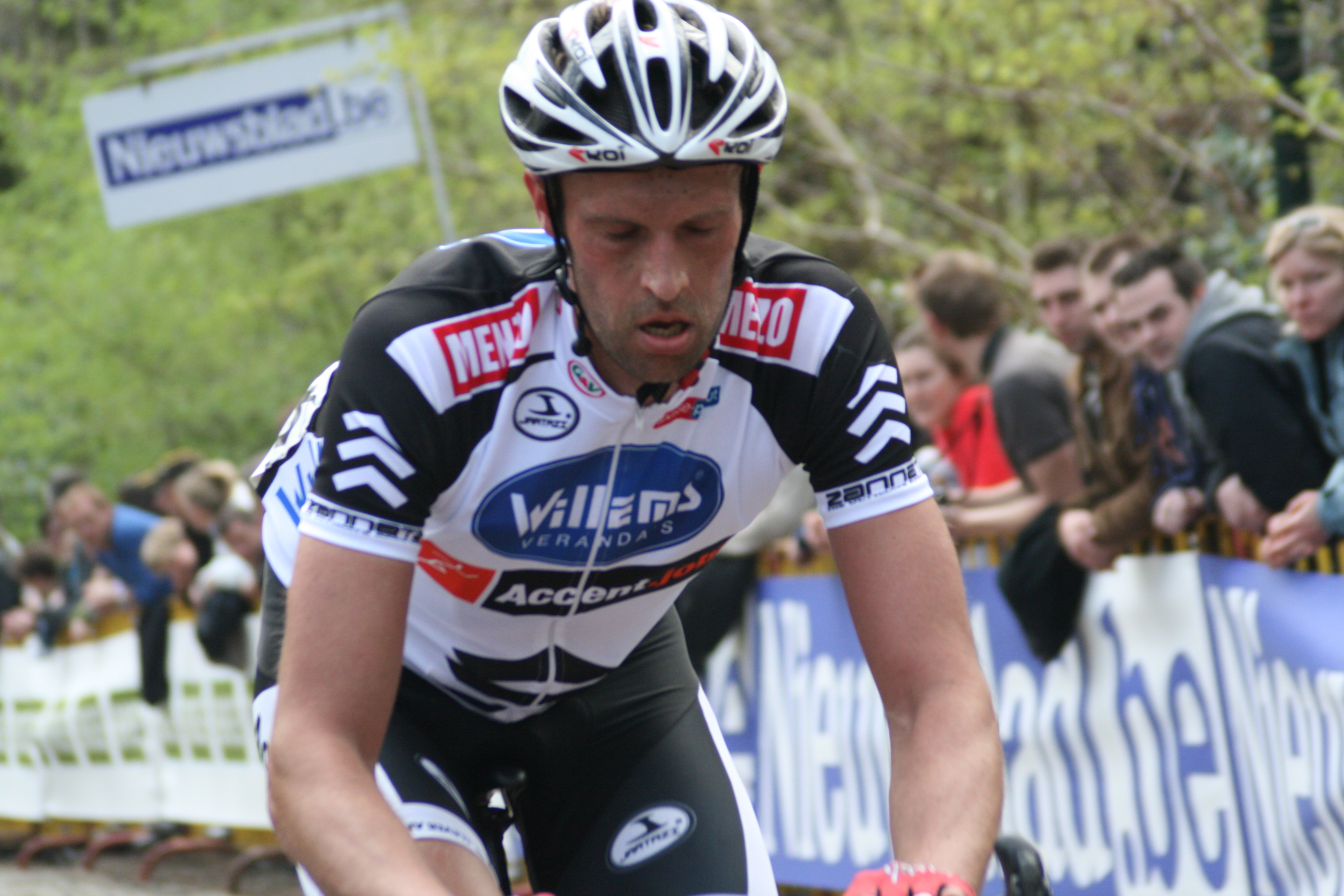

Personal information
- Born: 23 April 1977 (age 49) Terborg, Netherlands
- Height: 1.95 m (6 ft 5 in)
- Weight: 77 kg (170 lb)

Cycling career
- Sport: Cycling
- Current team: Retired
- Discipline: Road
- Role: Rider

Professional teams
- 1999: TVM–Farm Frites (stagiaire)
- 2000: Farm Frites
- 2001–2003: BankGiroLoterij–Batavus
- 2004–2006: T-Mobile Team
- 2007–2010: Van Vliet–EBH Advocaten
- 2011: Veranda's Willems–Accent

Bram Schmitz (born 23 April 1977) is a retired Dutch professional road cyclist.

== Major results ==
1999
1st Stage 3 OZ Wielerweekend
5th Rund um den Henninger Turm U23
8th Overall Olympia's Tour
2000
1st Challenge de Hesbaye
2nd Brussel-Opwijk
2001
8th Rund um den Flughafen Köln–Bonn
2002
2nd Overall Ster ZLM Toer

1st Stage 4 (ITT)

4th Overall Four Days of Dunkirk
4th Ronde van Midden-Zeeland
4th Schaal Sels
6th GP de Villers-Cotterêts
7th Hel van het Mergelland
10th Veenendaal–Veenendaal
2003
1st Overall Tour of Rhodes
1st Mountains classification, Deutschland Tour
1st Mountains classification, Tour de Luxembourg
1st Mountains classification, Grote Prijs Erik Breukink
4th Veenendaal–Veenendaal
4th Grand Prix S.A.T.S.
5th Overall Ster Elektrotoer
9th Dwars door Gendringen
2005
1st Stage 5 Tour de Luxembourg
1st Mountains classification, Vuelta a Aragón
2007
1st Stages 1 & 3 Cinturón a Mallorca
7th Overall Ster Elektrotoer
2008
1st De Vlaamse Pijl
1st Rund um Düren
2nd Overall Tour de Bretagne Cycliste
2nd Omloop der Kempen
5th Omloop van het Waasland
9th Overall Tour de Normandie
10th Trofeo Cala Millor-Cala Bona
10th Hel van het Mergelland
2009
1st Overall Tour de Normandie
1st Ster van Zwolle
2nd De Vlaamse Pijl
7th Dutch Food Valley Classic
2010
2nd Profronde van Fryslan
4th Overall Ster Elektrotoer
4th Omloop der Kempen
7th Rund um Düren
9th GP Stad Zottegem
10th Overall Olympia's Tour
2011
6th Overall Delta Tour Zeeland
