= Cees Lute =

Dutch cyclist (1941–2022)

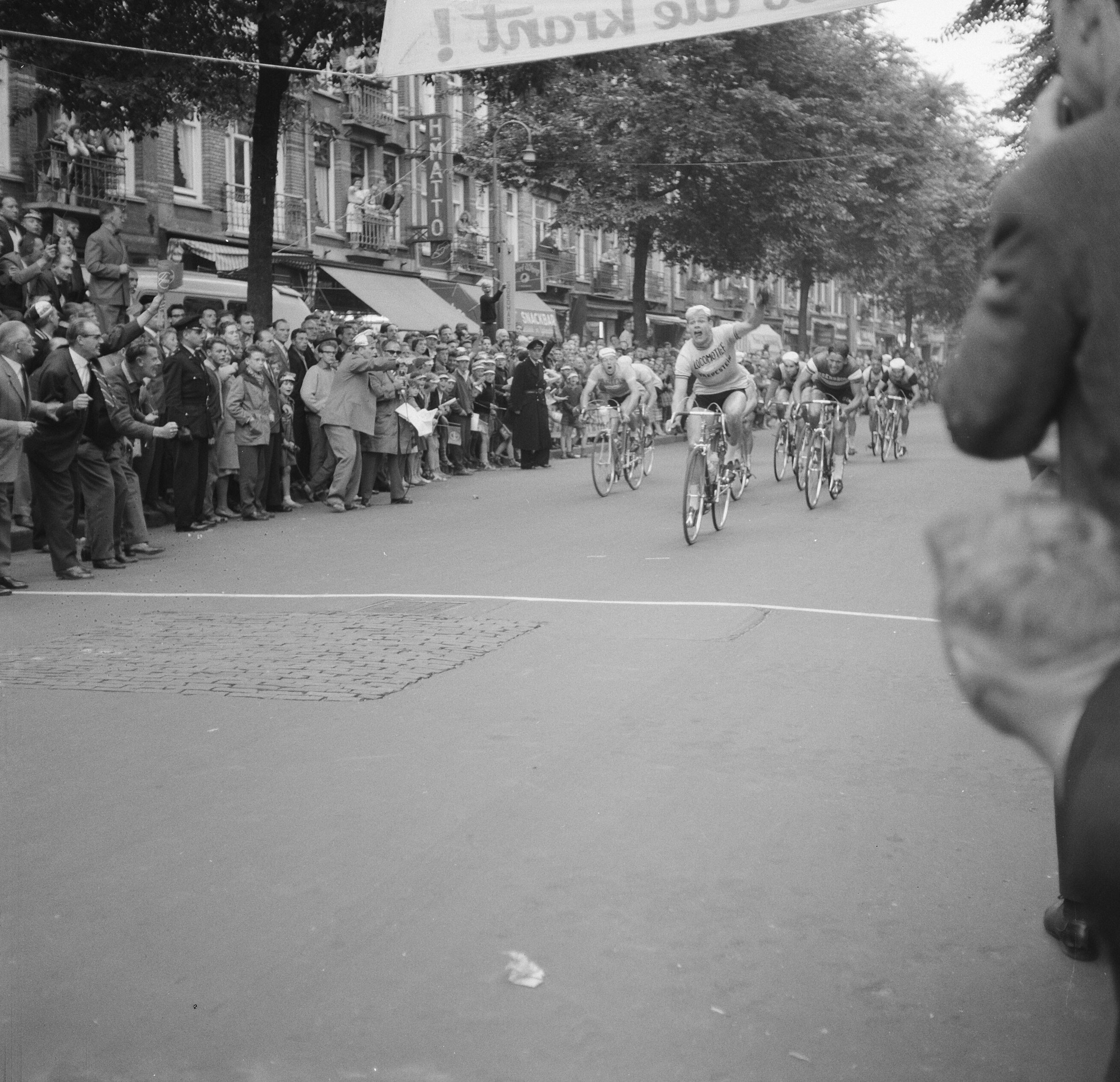
- Lute winning a stage of Olympia's Tour in 1961

Personal information
- Full name: Cornelis Wijnand Lute
- Born: 13 March 1941 Castricum, German-occupied Netherlands
- Died: 9 October 2022 (aged 81) Alkmaar, Netherlands

Cycling career
- Sport: Cycling
- Discipline: Road
- Role: Rider

Professional teams
- 1961–1962: Locomotief-Vredestein
- 1963: Caballero
- 1964: Saint-Raphaël–Gitane–Dunlop
- 1965–1966: Ford France–Gitane
- 1967: Roméo–Smith's
- 1968: Peycom

Cornelis Wijnand (Cees) Lute (13 March 1941 – 9 October 2022) was a Dutch cyclist.

Lute died in October 2022 in Alkmaar, at the age of 81.

== Major results ==
1959
1st Dwars door Gendringen
1960
1st Dwars door Gendringen
1st Omloop der Kempen
1st Stage 5 Olympia's Tour
1961
1st Stages 5 & 6 Olympia's Tour
1962
1st Omloop der Kempen
1964
1st Stage 19 Giro d'Italia
1st Overall Tour de Picardie
1965
1st Stage 4 Four Days of Dunkirk
1967
1st Stage 4 Giro di Sardegna
2nd Amstel Gold Race
