= Jason van Dalen =

Dutch cyclist

Personal information
- Full name: Jason van Dalen
- Born: 2 July 1994 (age 32) 's-Gravenzande, Netherlands
- Height: 1.78 m (5 ft 10 in)
- Weight: 70 kg (154 lb)

Cycling career
- Sport: Cycling
- Discipline: Road
- Role: Rider

Amateur team
- 2015–2016: Willebrord Wil Vooruit

Professional teams
- 2017–2018: Delta Cycling Rotterdam
- 2019–2021: Metec–TKH

Jason van Dalen (born 2 July 1994) is a Dutch cyclist, who last rode for UCI Continental team Metec–Solarwatt p/b Mantel.

== Major results ==
2016
1st Stage 5 Vuelta a Zamora
2017
1st Stage 2 Okolo Jižních Čech
2018
1st Stage 3b Sibiu Cycling Tour
5th Overall Rás Tailteann

1st Stage 4

6th Overall Tour de Normandie
7th Ronde van Midden-Nederland
7th Ronde van Overijssel
8th Ronde van Noord-Holland
8th Veenendaal–Veenendaal Classic
9th Fyen Rundt
2019
3rd Overall Course de Solidarność et des Champions Olympiques
8th Tacx Pro Classic
2020
10th Overall Bałtyk–Karkonosze Tour
10th Overall Course de Solidarność et des Champions Olympiques
2021
9th Overall Course de Solidarność et des Champions Olympiques
