= Justin Timmermans =

Dutch cyclist

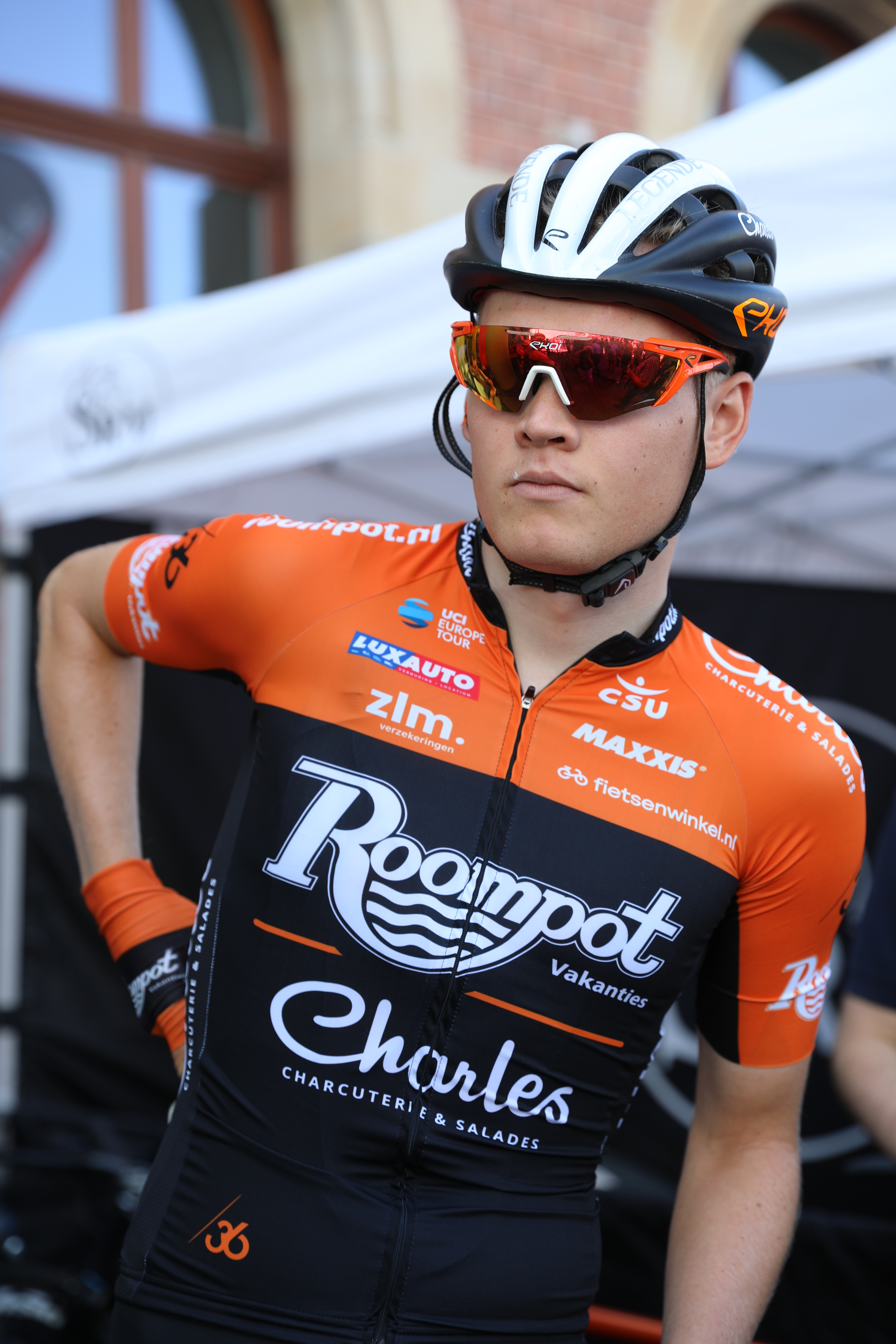
- Timmermans in 2019

Personal information
- Full name: Justin Timmermans
- Born: 25 September 1996 (age 30) Hardenberg, Netherlands

Cycling career
- Sport: Cycling
- Current team: Retired
- Discipline: Road
- Role: Rider

Amateur team
- 2015: NWV Groningen

Professional teams
- 2016–2017: Baby-Dump Cyclingteam
- 2018: Delta Cycling Rotterdam
- 2019: Roompot–Charles
- 2020: VolkerWessels–Merckx Cycling Team

Justin Timmermans (born 25 September 1996) is a Dutch former racing cyclist, who rode professionally between 2016 and 2020 for the Baby-Dump Cyclingteam, Delta Cycling Rotterdam, Roompot–Charles and the VolkerWessels–Merckx Cycling Team. He rode in the 2019 Paris–Roubaix, but did not finish.

== Major results ==
2017
8th Slag om Norg
