= Wesseling (surname) =

Wesseling, and its variant Wesselink, is a Dutch toponymic surname. There were a great number of farms named Wesseling or Wesselink in the eastern Netherlands, reflecting that they once belonged to a person named Wessel. There is also a town named Wesseling in Germany. People with this surname or its variants include:

== Wesseling ==
- Gerard Wesseling (born 1939), Dutch road cyclist
- Henk Wesseling (1937–2018), Dutch historian
- Maria Riccarda Wesseling (born 1969), Swiss-Dutch operatic mezzo-soprano
- Petrus Wesseling (1692–1764), German-born Dutch philologist and university president
- Pieter Wesseling (born 1942), Dutch engineer and mathematician
- Roy Wesseling (born 1964), Dutch football manager

== Wesselink ==
- Adriaan Wesselink (1909–1995), Dutch astronomer
- Filemon Wesselink (born 1979), Dutch reporter and television presenter
- Marloes Wesselink (born 1987), Dutch beach volleyball player

== See also ==
- Asteroid 1945 Wesselink, named after Adriaan Wesselink
- Hermann Wesselink College, secondary school in Amstelveen named after its first principal
