= Gendringen =

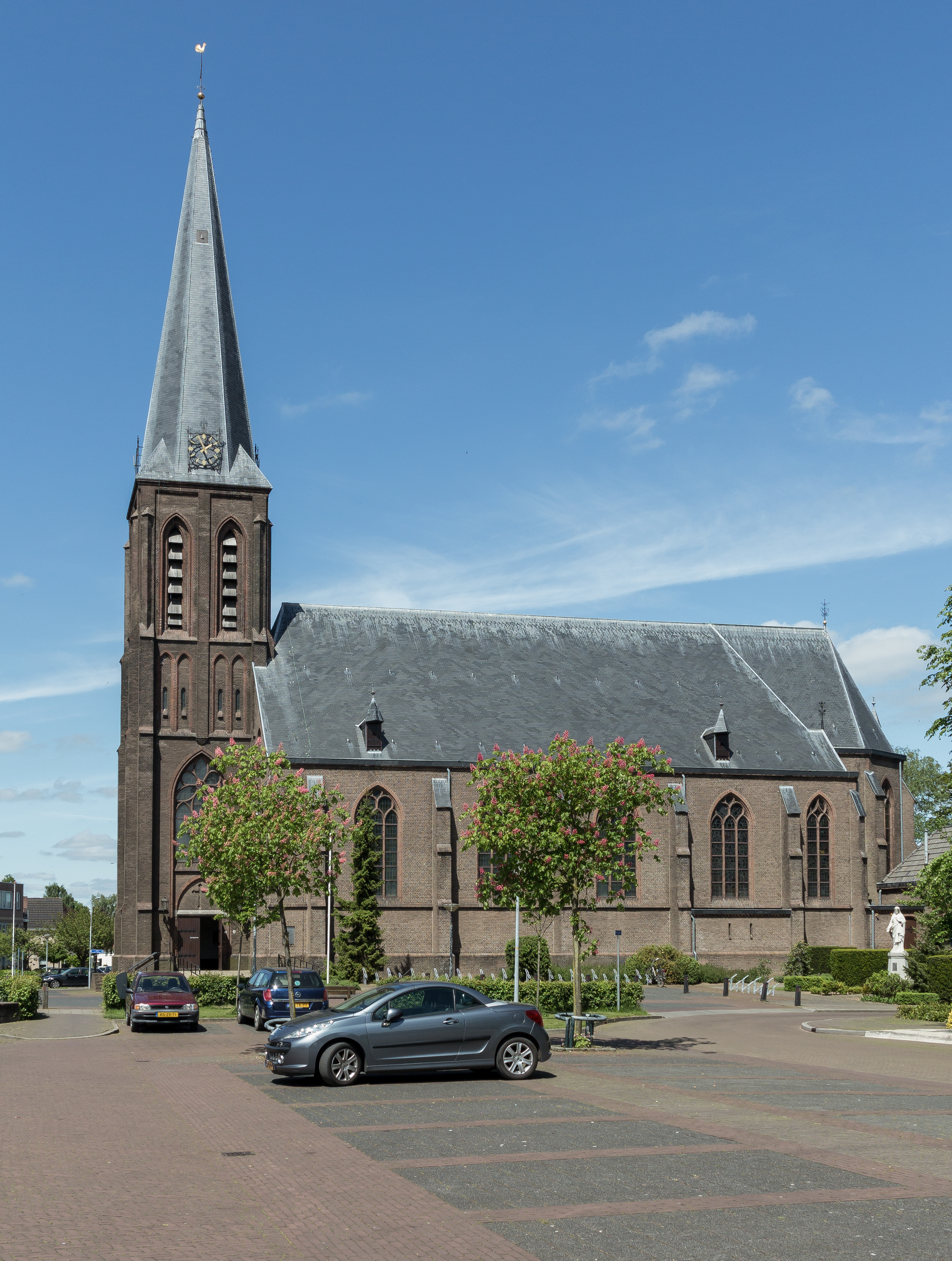
- Saint Martin Church

- Flag Coat of arms

- Location in the province of Gelderland in the Netherlands Gendringen (Netherlands)
- Coordinates: 51°52′22″N 6°22′34″E
- Country: Netherlands
- Province: Gelderland
- Municipality: Oude IJsselstreek

Area
  - Total: 7.00 km^{2} (2.70 sq mi)
- Elevation: 15 m (49 ft)

Population (2021)
  - Total: 3,955
  - Density: 565/km^{2} (1,460/sq mi)
- Time zone: UTC+1 (CET)
  - Summer (DST): UTC+2 (CEST)
- Postal code: 7081
- Dialing code: 0315

Gendringen (Dutch pronunciation: [ˈɣɛndrɪŋə(n)]) is a village in the Dutch province of Gelderland. It is in the municipality of Oude IJsselstreek, about 12 km (7.5 mi) southeast of Doetinchem and 20 km (12 mi) northwest of the German city Bocholt. It has approximately 4400 inhabitants. In the Middle Ages, Gendringen was a fortress. Being property of the archbishop of Köln (Cologne), Gendringen was loaned to the lords living in the castle of 's-Heerenberg. In 1830, downtown Gendringen burned down for the most part. Nowadays, most of the entrepreneurs of the town are situated in the Grotestraat, which makes this street the most important street of downtown Gendringen. Gendringen was a separate municipality until 2005. Then, due to the municipal re-organization in the Achterhoek, Gendringen and Wisch joined into Oude IJsselstreek.

Gendringen has two primary schools: Catholic school Christoffelschool and Christian school De Hoeksteen. On the north of the village is the industrial zone De IJsselweide, which is between Gendringen and nearby town Ulft. In the northeast of the village, there is a large park, Het Kernspark. On the east of Gendringen there is a large recreation area, Engbergen, with a forest with hiking routes, a restaurant with a large playground, an open-air theatre, a golf court, a corn mill, and a petting zoo.

Gendringen can be accessed easily both by car and public transport: the nearest highway is 15 minutes away, and on weekdays, a bus drives between Gendringen and Doetinchem railway station at least every 30 minutes. Gendringen also has its own small airport suitable for ultralight aircraft approximately 2 km (1.2 mi) on the east of the village in nearby neighbourhood Voorst.

Examples of events held every year in Gendringen are Amfipop, a low-budget pop festival, the village fair, the carnival and King's Day festivities, and Gast in Gendringen, an event with artists giving small concerts in several houses and small buildings throughout the village.

== Sports ==
Gendringen has one football club, v.v. Gendringen, which plays in the 3e Klasse (3rd class). The village also has a tennis club (LTC De IJsselweide) and a gym and a gymnastics club (St. Paulus). Gendringen has had its own cycling event since 1937. Until 2004, Gendringen had its own cycle race, Dwars door Gendringen. In the period of 2006 until 2016, Gendringen has taken part in the Olympia's Tour. Since 2017, Gendringen has its own race again, the Ronde van de Achterhoek. Examples of famous cyclists who won the race at least once are Servais Knaven, Jeroen Blijlevens, and Alessandro Petacchi. Regularly, the NK (Dutch Championships) Survival takes place in Gendringen. Local athletics club Atletico '73 is well known for the athletes Bram Som and Arnoud Okken. Atletico '73 is at sports park De IJsselweide, which is between Gendringen and nearby town Ulft and also accommodates the football club, as well as football club SDOUC from Ulft, hockey club HCOIJ, and a modern indoor sports hall.

== Born in Gendringen ==
- Johannes van der Vegte (1892–1945), Olympic rower
- Arne Jansen (1951–2007), singer

== Gallery ==
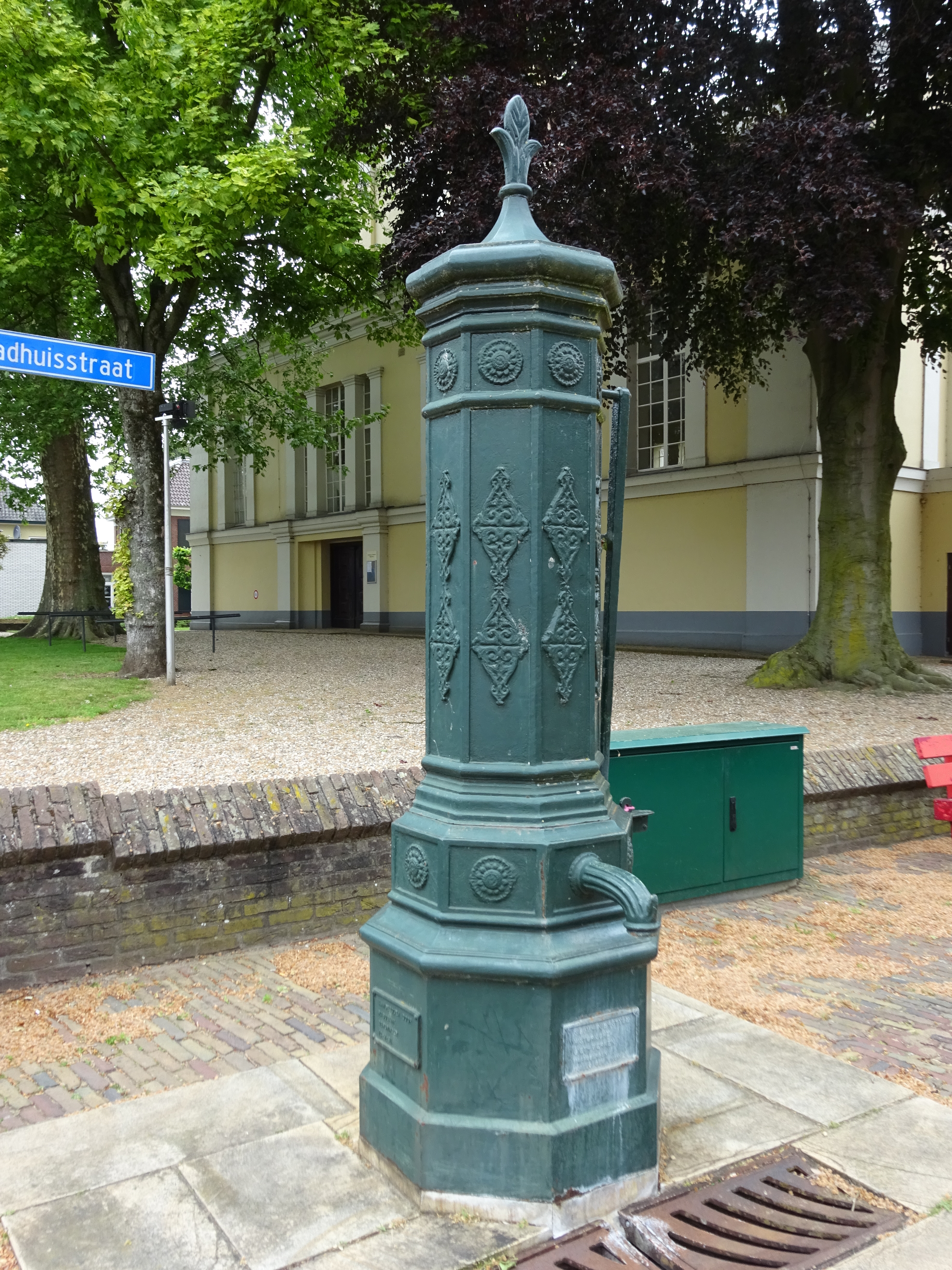
Village pump

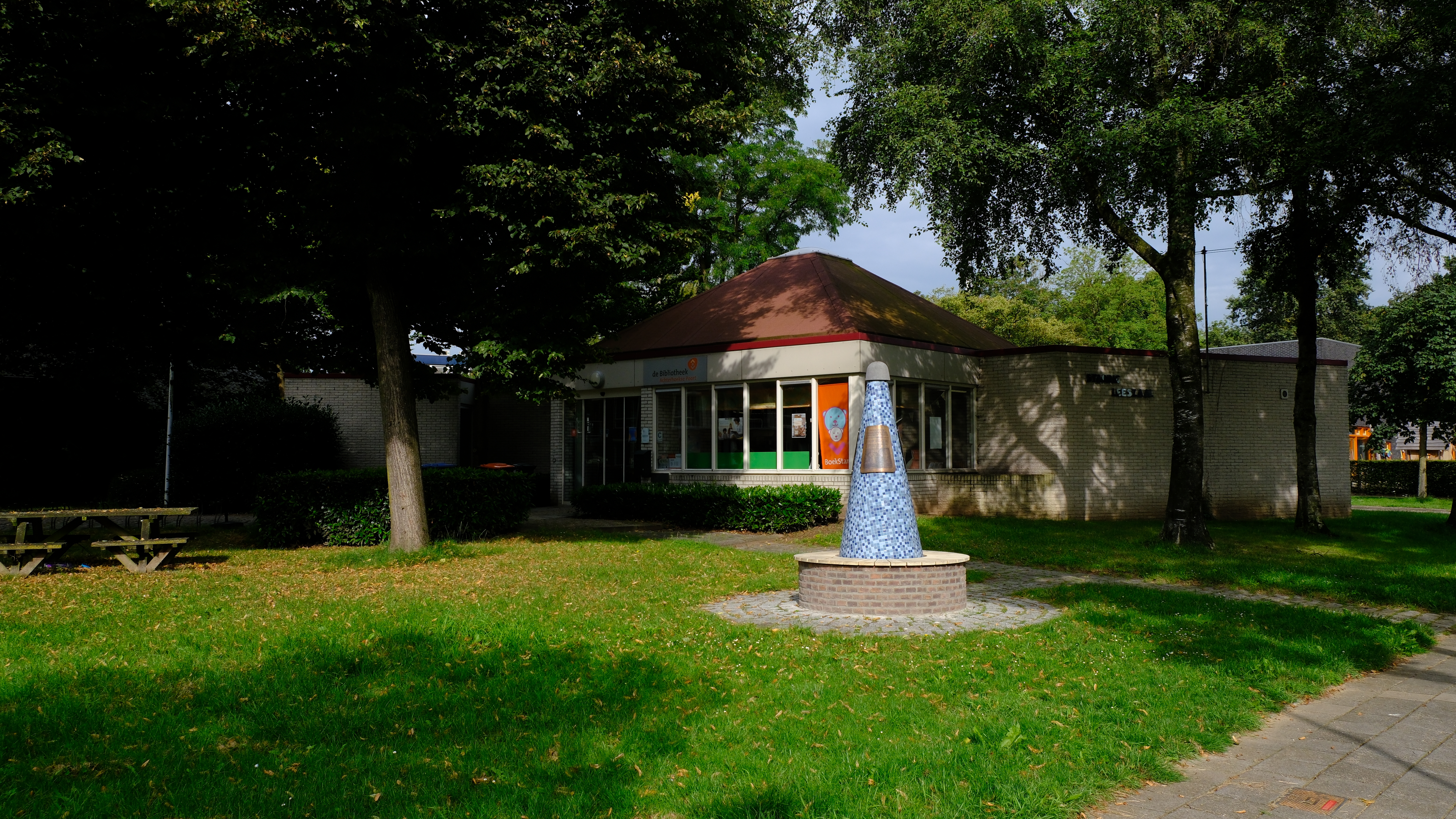
Library

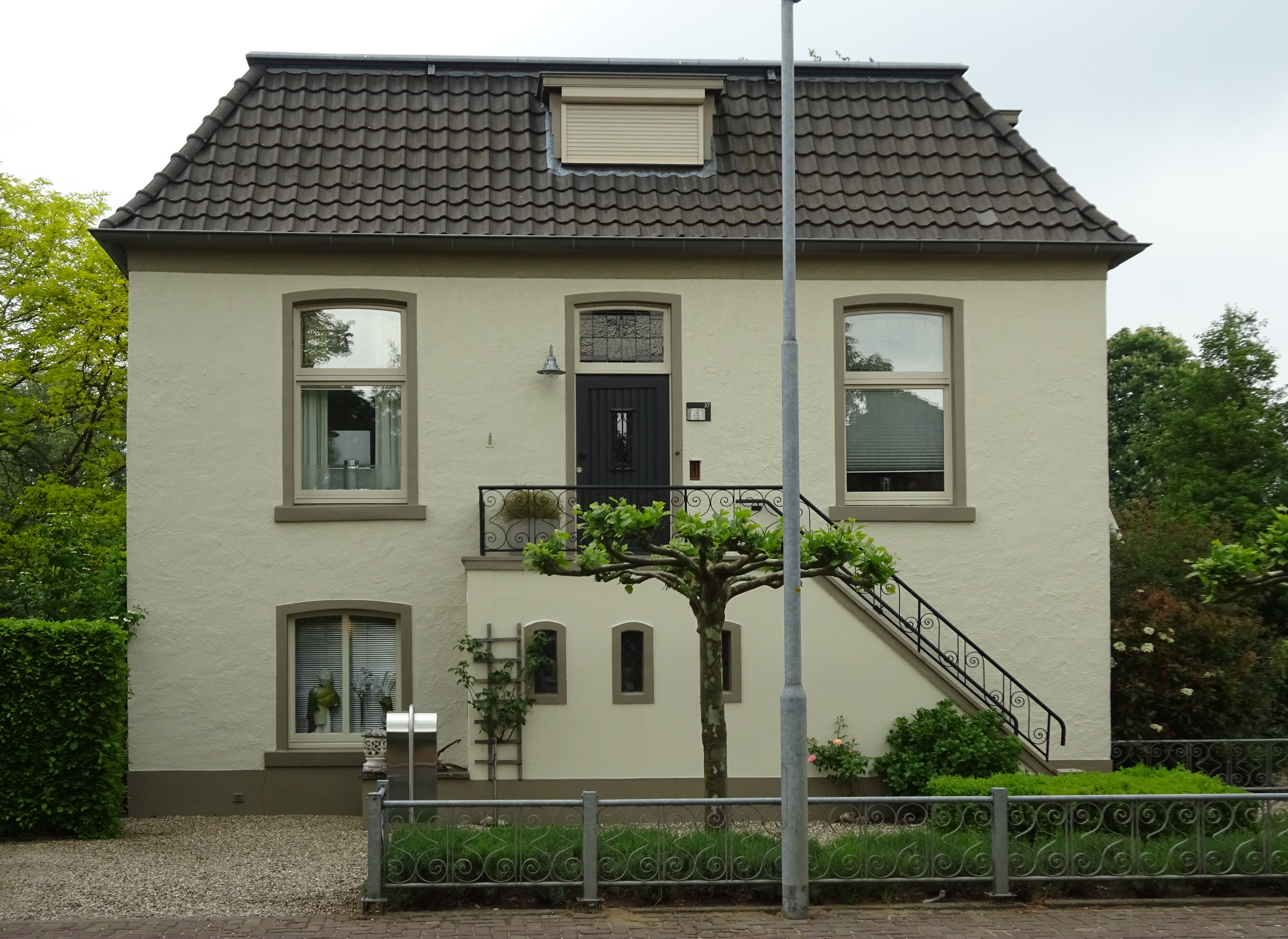
House in Gendringen

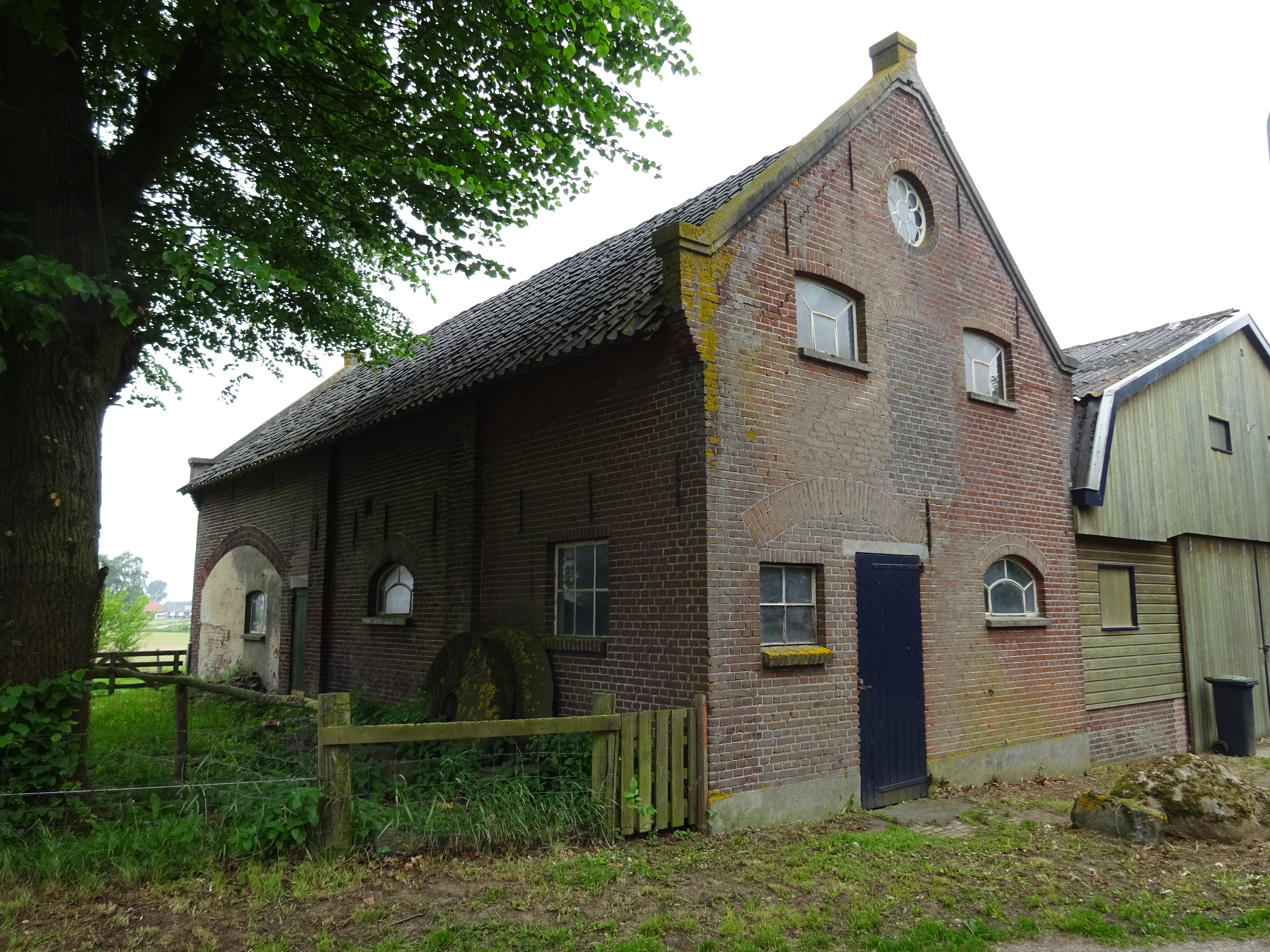
Building in Gendringen
