= 2018 Sibiu Cycling Tour =

2018 UCI Europe Tour

Race details
- Dates: 5–8 July 2018
- Stages: 5
- Distance: 441.2 km (274.1 mi)

Results
Jersey awarded to the overall winner	Winner	Iván Sosa (COL)	(Androni Giocattoli–Sidermec)
	Second	Alexey Rybalkin (RUS)	(Gazprom–RusVelo)
	Third	Aleksandr Vlasov (RUS)	(Gazprom–RusVelo)
Jersey awarded to the points classification winner	Points	Iván Sosa (COL)	(Androni Giocattoli–Sidermec)
Jersey awarded to the mountains classification winner	Mountains	Iván Sosa (COL)	(Androni Giocattoli–Sidermec)
Jersey awarded to the young rider classification winner	Young rider	Iván Sosa (COL)	(Androni Giocattoli–Sidermec)
Jersey awarded to the team classification winner	Team	Gazprom–RusVelo	

The 2018 Sibiu Cycling Tour is a cycling stage race that took place between 5 and 8 July 2018 in and around Sibiu, Romania. Raced over 441 kilometres (274 miles), the race featured a traditional cobbled prologue along with mountain stages to Bâlea Lake and Păltiniș, and was held as part of the 2018 UCI Europe Tour.

In 2018 the race returned to the format last used in 2014 with four days of racing including two mountain top finishes. There were two stages on the final day including the return of the team time trial.

== Teams ==
The peloton featured three Professional Continental Teams, 14 Continental Teams and two national teams.

UCI Professional Continental teams

- Androni Giocattoli–Sidermec
- CCC–Sprandi–Polkowice
- Gazprom–RusVelo

UCI Continental teams

- Akros–Renfer SA
- Amore & Vita–Prodir
- Bike Aid
- D'Amico Utensilnord
- Dukla Banská Bystrica
- Delta Cycling Rotterdam
- Elkov–Author
- Massi–Kuwait
- Monkey Town Continental Team
- MsTina–Focus
- Sangemini–MG.K Vis Vega
- Team Illuminate
- Team Novak
- Wibatech Merx 7R

National Teams

- Romania
- Moldova

== Route ==
The race route was announced in December 2017.

Stage schedule
Stage	Date	Course	Distance	Type	Winner
P	5 July	Sibiu to Sibiu	2.2 km (1 mi)	Individual time trial	Davide Ballerini (ITA)
1	6 July	Sibiu to Balea Lac	91.2 km (57 mi)	Mountain stage	Iván Sosa (COL)
2	7 July	Sibiu to Paltinis	185.4 km (115 mi)	Mountain stage	Stage Cancelled
3a	8 July	Cisnadie to Sibiu	9.6 km (6 mi)	Team time trial	CCC–Sprandi–Polkowice
3b	8 July	Sibiu to Sibiu	152.8 km (95 mi)	Medium-mountain stage	Jason van Dalen (NED)

== Stages ==
=== Prologue ===
5 July 2017 — Sibiu to Sibiu, 2.2 km (1 mi), individual time trial (ITT)

Raced over a technical 2.2 km (1.4 mi) with 20 corners and several cobbled sections, the stage was won by Italian Davide Ballerini who would be the only rider to finish in under 3 minutes.

Prologue result & General classification after Prologue
Rank	Rider	Team	Time
1	Davide Ballerini (ITA)	Androni Giocattoli–Sidermec	02' 59"
2	Riccardo Stacchiotti (ITA)	MsTina–Focus	+ 02"
3	Ivar Slik (NED)	Monkey Town Continental Team	+ 03"
4	Jason Van Dalen (NED)	Delta Cycling Rotterdam	+ 03"
5	Andrea Vendrame (ITA)	Androni Giocattoli–Sidermec	+ 03"
6	Adrian Kurek (POL)	CCC–Sprandi–Polkowice	+ 04"
7	Martin Laas (EST)	Team Illuminate	+ 04"
8	Nicolas Marini (ITA)	MsTina–Focus	+ 05"
9	Eduard Grosu (ROM)	Romanian National Team	+ 05"
10	Wim Kleiman (NED)	Monkey Town Continental Team	+ 05"

=== Stage 1 ===
6 July 2017 — Sibiu to Balea Lac, 91.2 km (57 mi)

For the second year in a row, there was a Colombian victory on the slopes of Balea Lac. With five kilometres remaining in the stage Iván Sosa attacked a depleted peloton of 15-20 riders. Initially, two riders, Maxim Rusnac and Amaro Antunes remained with him, but with a second attack he shook off the other contenders and rode to a solo victory.

Stage 1 result
Rank	Rider	Team	Time
1	Iván Sosa (COL)	Androni Giocattoli–Sidermec	2h 24' 11"
2	Aleksey Rybalkin (RUS)	Gazprom–RusVelo	+ 38"
3	Antonio Santoro (ITA)	Monkey Town Continental Team	+ 55"
4	Aleksandr Vlasov (RUS)	Gazprom–RusVelo	+ 56"
5	Amaro Antunes (POR)	CCC–Sprandi–Polkowice	+ 56"
6	Maxim Rusnac (MDA)	Moldovan National Team	+ 1' 39"
7	Michelle Gazarra (ITA)	Sangemini–MG.K Vis Vega	+ 1' 39"
8	Ivan Martinelli (ITA)	D'Amico Utensilnord	+ 1' 41"
9	Nicola Gaffurini (ITA)	Sangemini–MG.K Vis Vega	+ 1' 52"
10	Colin Stussi (SUI)	Amore & Vita–Prodir	+ 2' 01"

General Classification after Stage 1
Rank	Rider	Team	Time
1	Iván Sosa (COL)	Androni Giocattoli–Sidermec	2h 37' 24"
2	Aleksey Rybalkin (RUS)	Gazprom–RusVelo	+ 45"
3	Antonio Santoro (ITA)	Monkey Town Continental Team	+ 58"
4	Aleksandr Vlasov (RUS)	Gazprom–RusVelo	+ 1' 01"
5	Amaro Antunes (POR)	CCC–Sprandi–Polkowice	+ 1' 12"
6	Maxim Rusnac (MDA)	Moldovan National Team	+ 1' 38"
7	Michelle Gazarra (ITA)	Sangemini–MG.K Vis Vega	+ 1' 40"
8	Ivan Martinelli (ITA)	D'Amico Utensilnord	+ 1' 51"
9	Colin Stussi (SUI)	Amore & Vita–Prodir	+ 2' 01"
10	Nicola Gaffurini (ITA)	Sangemini–MG.K Vis Vega	+ 2' 06"

=== Stage 2 ===
7 July 2017 — Sibiu to Paltinis, 185.4 km (115 mi)

Stage 2 was expected to be a 185 km (115 mi) mountain stage to the resort of Paltanis. Despite setting off in bright conditions, after 125 km (78 mi) the race was engulfed by a storm that saw rain, hail, thunder and lightning, with visibility at less than 20 metres and with police unable to maintain road closures. In coordination with the race organisers, the jury decided to apply the UCI Extreme Weather Protocol, declaring the stage null and void in accordance with article 2.2.029 of the UCI rulebook.

=== Stage 3a ===
8 July 2017 — Cisnadie to Sibiu, Team time trial, 9.6 km (6 mi)

Stage 3a result
Rank	Team	Time
1	CCC–Sprandi–Polkowice	11' 26"
2	Gazprom–RusVelo	+ 9"
3	Elkov–Author	+ 11"
4	Androni Giocattoli–Sidermec	+ 14"
5	Akros–Renfer SA	+ 25"
6	Delta Cycling Rotterdam	+ 26"
7	Monkey Town Continental Team	+ 30"
8	Sangemini–MG.K Vis Vega	+ 35"
9	D'Amico Utensilnord	+ 42"
10	Dukla Banská Bystrica	+ 57"

General Classification after Stage 3a
Rank	Rider	Team	Time
1	Iván Sosa (COL)	Androni Giocattoli–Sidermec	2h 52' 12"
2	Aleksey Rybalkin (RUS)	Gazprom–RusVelo	+ 47"
3	Aleksandr Vlasov (RUS)	Gazprom–RusVelo	+ 1' 01"
4	Amaro Antunes (POR)	CCC–Sprandi–Polkowice	+ 1' 12"
5	Antonio Santoro (ITA)	Monkey Town Continental Team	+ 1' 14""
6	Michelle Gazarra (ITA)	Sangemini–MG.K Vis Vega	+ 2' 02"
7	Jan Bárta (CZE)	Elkov–Author	+ 2' 09"
8	Alessandro Bisolti (ITA)	Androni Giocattoli–Sidermec	+ 2' 24"
9	Ivan Martinelli (ITA)	D'Amico Utensilnord	+ 2' 29"
10	Nicola Gaffurini (ITA)	Sangemini–MG.K Vis Vega	+ 2' 41"

=== Stage 3b ===
8 July 2017 — Sibiu to Sibiu, 152.8 km (95 mi)

== Classification leadership table ==
In the 2018 Sibiu Cycling Tour, six different jerseys are awarded of which four are worn in the race. The most important is the general classification, which is calculated by adding each cyclist's finishing times on each stage. Time bonuses are awarded to the first three finishers on all stages with the exception of the time trial: the stage winner won a ten-second bonus, with six and four seconds for the second and third riders respectively. Bonus seconds were also awarded to the first three riders at intermediate sprints; three seconds for the winner of the sprint, two seconds for the rider in second and one second for the rider in third. The rider with the least accumulated time is the race leader, identified by a yellow jersey. This classification is considered the most important of the 2017 Sibiu Cycling Tour, and the winner of the classification is considered the winner of the race.

Points for the mountains classification
Position	1	2	3	4	5	6	7	8	9	10
Points for Category SA	20	18	16	14	12	10	8	7	6	5
Points for Category A	12	8	6	4	2	0				
Points for Category B	6	4	2	0						
Points for Category C	3	2	1	0						

There is also a mountains classification, the leadership of which is marked by a white jersey. In the mountains classification, points towards the classification are won by reaching the top of a climb before other cyclists. Each climb is categorised as either category SA, A, B or C, with more points available for the higher-categorised climbs.

The third jersey represents the young rider classification, marked by an orange jersey. This is decided the same way as the general classification, but only riders born on or after 1 January 1995 are eligible to be ranked in the classification.

The fourth classification is the sprints classification, the leader of which is awarded a blue jersey. In the sprints classification, riders receive points for finishing in the top three at intermediate sprint points during each stage – awarded on a 3–2–1 scale – and these intermediate sprints also offer bonus seconds towards the general classification as noted above.

Additionally, there is a points classification, which awards a green jersey but that jersey is not represented in the race and only present on the podium. In the points classification, cyclists receive points for finishing in the top 15 in a stage, and unlike in the points classification in the Tour de France, the winners of all stages (with the exception of the prologue) are awarded the same number of points. For winning a stage, a rider earns 25 points, with 20 for second, 16 for third, 14 for fourth, 12 for fifth, 10 for sixth with a point fewer per place down to a single point for 15th place.

The sixth and final jersey represents the classification for Romanian riders, marked by a red jersey. This is decided the same way as the general classification, but only riders born in Romania are eligible to be ranked in the classification. Like the points jersey this is only present on the podium and is not worn in race

There are also awards for the team classification, in which the times of the best three cyclists per team on each stage are added together; the leading team at the end of the race is the team with the lowest total time.

Stage	Winner	General classification	Mountains classification	Young rider classification	Sprints classification	Points classification	Romanian rider classification	Teams classification
P	Davide Ballerini	Davide Ballerini	Not awarded	Jens Van Den Dool	Not awarded	Not awarded	Eduard-Michael Grosu	Delta Cycling Rotterdam
1	Iván Sosa	Iván Sosa	Iván Sosa (Note: In stages 2, 3a and 4, Aleksei Rybalkin, who was second in the mountains classification, wore the white mountains jersey, because Iván Sosa (in first place) wore the yellow jersey as leader of the general classification.)	Iván Sosa (Note: In stages 2, 3a, and 4, Aleksandr Vlasov, who was second in the young rider classification, wore the orange young rider jersey, because Iván Sosa (in first place) wore the yellow jersey as leader of the general classification.)	Adrian Janssen	Iván Sosa	Emil Dima	Sangemini–MG.K Vis Vega
2	Stage Cancelled	Iván Sosa	Iván Sosa	Iván Sosa	Adrian Janssen	Iván Sosa	Emil Dima	Sangemini–MG.K Vis Vega
3a	CCC–Sprandi–Polkowice	Iván Sosa	Iván Sosa	Iván Sosa	Adrian Janssen	Iván Sosa	Emil Dima	Gazprom–RusVelo
3b	Jason van Dalen	Iván Sosa	Iván Sosa	Iván Sosa			Emil Dima	Gazprom–RusVelo
