= Tour de Normandie =

French multi-day road cycling race

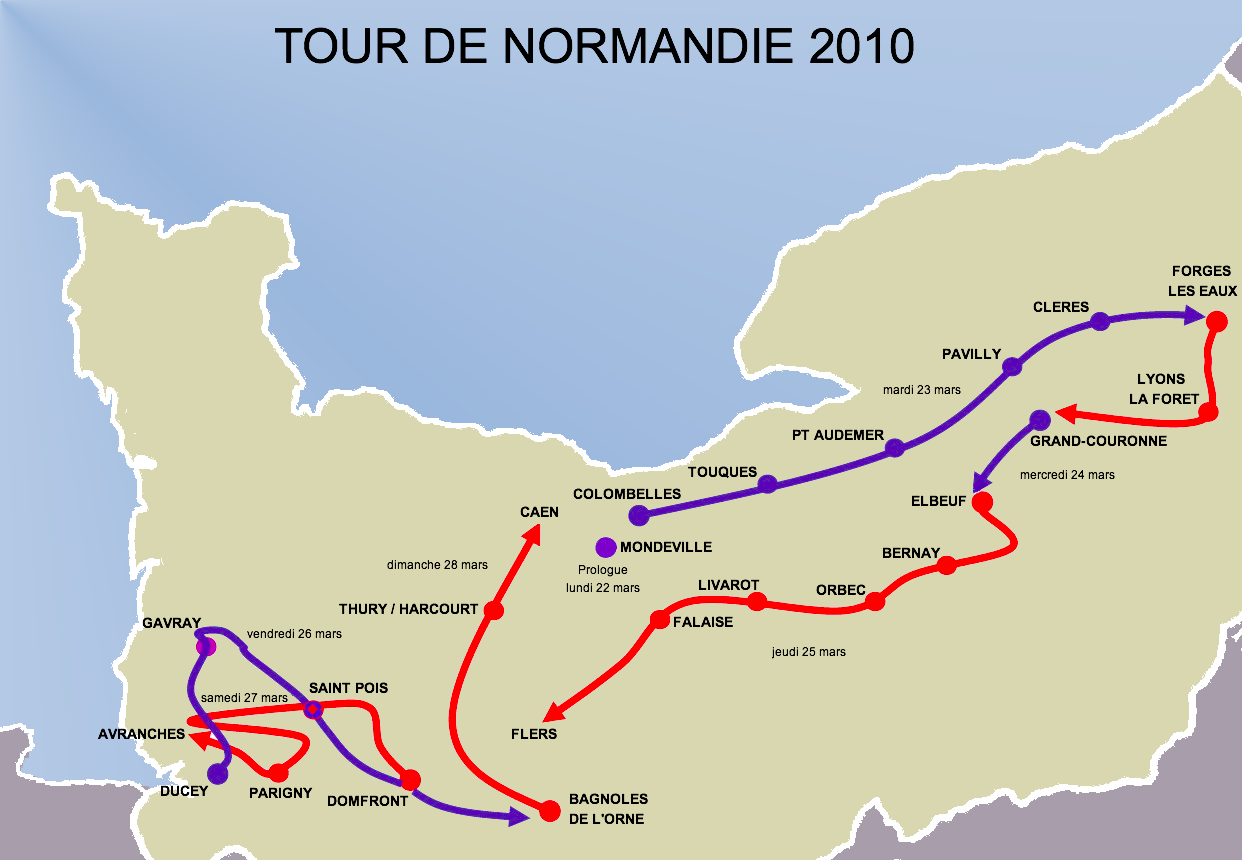

Race details
- Date: March
- Region: Normandie, France
- Discipline: Road
- Competition: UCI Europe Tour
- Web site: www.tourdenormandiecycliste.fr

History
- First edition: 1939
- Editions: 45 (as of 2022)
- First winner: Guillaume Godere (FRA)
- Most wins: Yvan Frebert (FRA); Kai Reus (NED) (2 wins)
- Most recent: Mathis Le Berre (FRA)

Tour de Normandie is a road bicycle race held annually in the region of Normandy, France. The race started in 1939, but was not held in the periods of 1940–1955 and 1960–1980. It was originally a race for amateurs, but was opened for professionals in 1996. The Tour de Normandie has been one of the races in the UCI Europe Tour since 2005, in the 2.2 category. The race was not held in 2020 and 2021 due to the COVID-19 pandemic The first edition of the women's race was held in March 2023 and was won by Cédrine Kerbaol.

== Winners ==
=== Men's race ===
| Year | Country | Rider | Team |
|---|---|---|---|
| 1939 | France | Guillaume Godere | individual |
| 1940– 1955 | No race | | |
| 1956 | France | Amand Audaire | Arrow–Hutchinson |
| 1957 | France | Pierre Gouget | Mercier–BP–Hutchinson |
| 1958 | France | Joseph Wasko | Alcyon–Dunlop |
| 1959 | France | Bernard Leboulanger | |
| 1960– 1980 | No race | | |
| 1981 | France | Michel Riou | |
| 1982 | France | Daniel Leveau | |
| 1983 | France | Yvan Frebert | |
| 1984 | East Germany | Mario Kummer | |
| 1985 | Great Britain | Paul Curran | |
| 1986 | Bulgaria | Nentcho Staikov | |
| 1987 | France | Yvan Frebert | |
| 1988 | Soviet Union | Viatcheslav Ekimov | |
| 1989 | France | Sébastien Flicher | |
| 1990 | Soviet Union | Dimitri Zhdanov | |
| 1991 | France | Stéphane Heulot | |
| 1992 | France | Thierry Dupuy | |
| 1993 | France | Emmanuel Mallet | |
| 1994 | Lithuania | Saulius Šarkauskas | |
| 1995 | Norway | Ole Sigurd Simensen | |
| 1996 | France | Frédéric Pontier | Aubervilliers 93 |
| 1997 | Sweden | Glenn Magnusson | Amore & Vita–ForzArcore |
| 1998 | Germany | Torsten Schmidt | Chicky World |
| 1999 | Norway | Steffen Kjærgaard | Chicky World |
| 2000 | France | Ludovic Auger | BigMat–Auber 93 |
| 2001 | Norway | Thor Hushovd | Crédit Agricole |
| 2002 | France | Jérôme Pineau | Bonjour |
| 2003 | France | Samuel Dumoulin | Jean Delatour |
| 2004 | Netherlands | Thomas Dekker | Rabobank GS3 |
| 2005 | Netherlands | Kai Reus | Rabobank Continental Team |
| 2006 | Netherlands | Kai Reus | Rabobank Continental Team |
| 2007 | Netherlands | Martijn Maaskant | Rabobank Continental Team |
| 2008 | France | Antoine Dalibard | Bretagne–Armor Lux |
| 2009 | Netherlands | Bram Schmitz | Van Vliet EBH Elshof |
| 2010 | Netherlands | Ronan van Zandbeek | Van Vliet EBH Elshof |
| 2011 | France | Alexandre Blain | Endura Racing |
| 2012 | France | Jérôme Cousin | Team Europcar |
| 2013 | Switzerland | Silvan Dillier | BMC Development Team |
| 2014 | Switzerland | Stefan Küng | BMC Development Team |
| 2015 | Belgium | Dimitri Claeys | Verandas Willems |
| 2016 | Belgium | Baptiste Planckaert | Wallonie-Bruxelles–Group Protect |
| 2017 | France | Anthony Delaplace | Fortuneo–Vital Concept |
| 2018 | Great Britain | Tom Stewart | JLT–Condor |
| 2019 | Norway | Ole Forfang | Joker Fuel of Norway |
| 2020; 2021 | No race due to COVID-19 pandemic | | |
| 2022 | France | Mathis Le Berre | Côtes d'Armor-Marie Morin-U |

=== Women's race ===
| Year | Country | Rider | Team |
|---|---|---|---|
| 2023 | France | Cédrine Kerbaol | Ceratizit–WNT Pro Cycling |
| 2024 | Norway | Mie Bjørndal Ottestad | Uno-X Mobility |
