= Robbert de Greef =

Dutch cyclist (1991–2019)

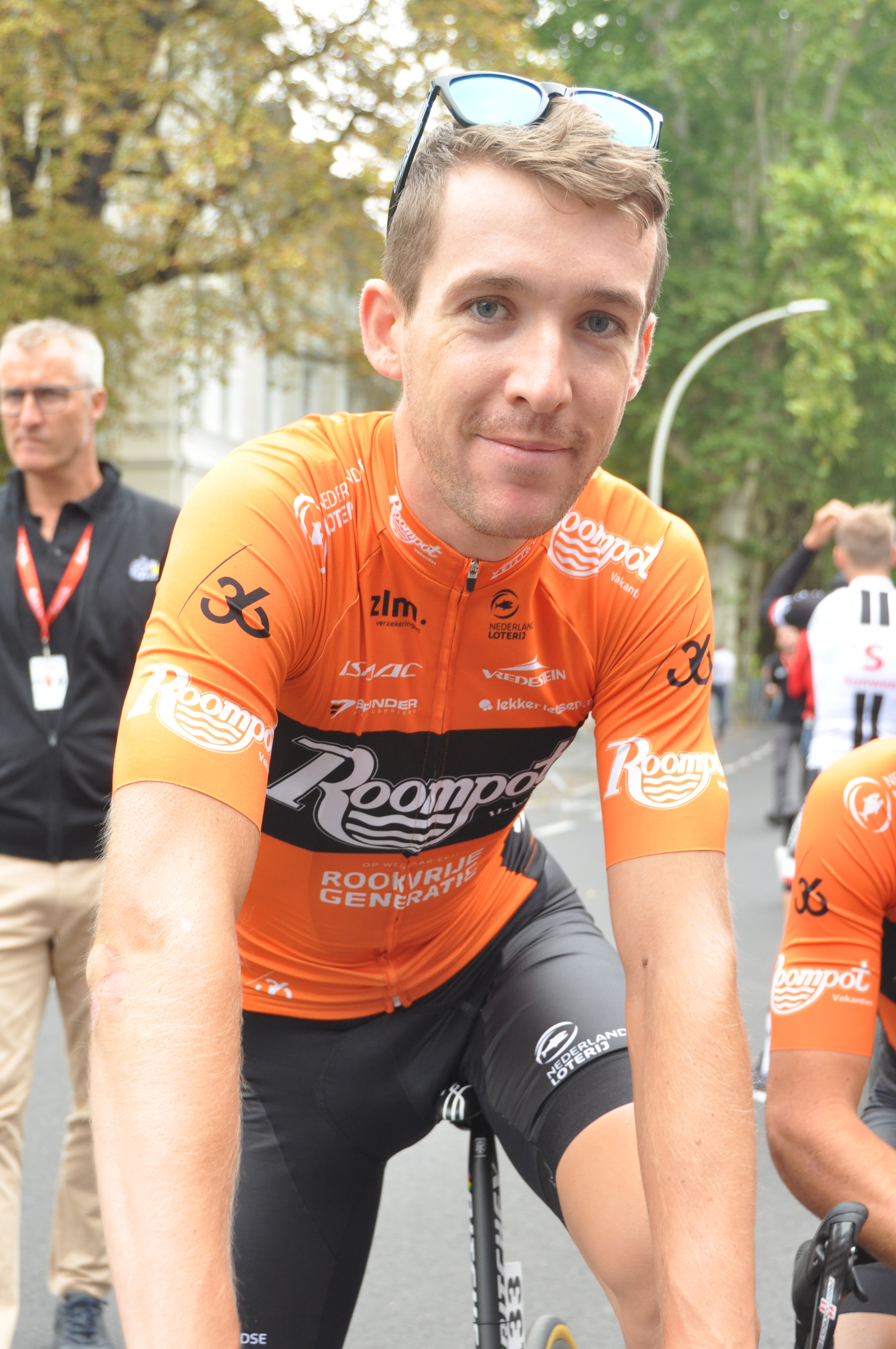
- De Greef in 2018.

Personal information
- Full name: Robbert de Greef
- Born: 27 August 1991 Geldrop, Netherlands
- Died: 26 April 2019 (aged 27) Antwerp, Belgium
- Height: 1.79 m (5 ft 10 in)
- Weight: 65 kg (143 lb)

Cycling career
- Sport: Cycling
- Discipline: Road
- Role: Rider

Amateur teams
- 2012: Baby-Dump–Lemmerns–Wilvo
- 2012: Cycling Team Jo Piels (stagiaire)

Professional teams
- 2013: Cycling Team Jo Piels
- 2014: Koga Cycling Team
- 2015–2016: Cyclingteam de Rijke
- 2017: Baby-Dump Cyclingteam
- 2018: Roompot–Nederlandse Loterij
- 2019: Alecto Cycling Team

Robbert de Greef (27 August 1991 – 26 April 2019) was a Dutch cyclist, who rode for Alecto Cycling Team. On 1 April 2019, de Greef suffered a cardiac arrest during the Omloop van de Braakman race. He died on 25 April 2019.

== Major results ==
2016
6th Dwars door de Vlaamse Ardennen
2017
1st Kernen Omloop Echt-Susteren
2019
2nd Ronde van Drenthe
