= Joseph Dries =

Belgian cyclist

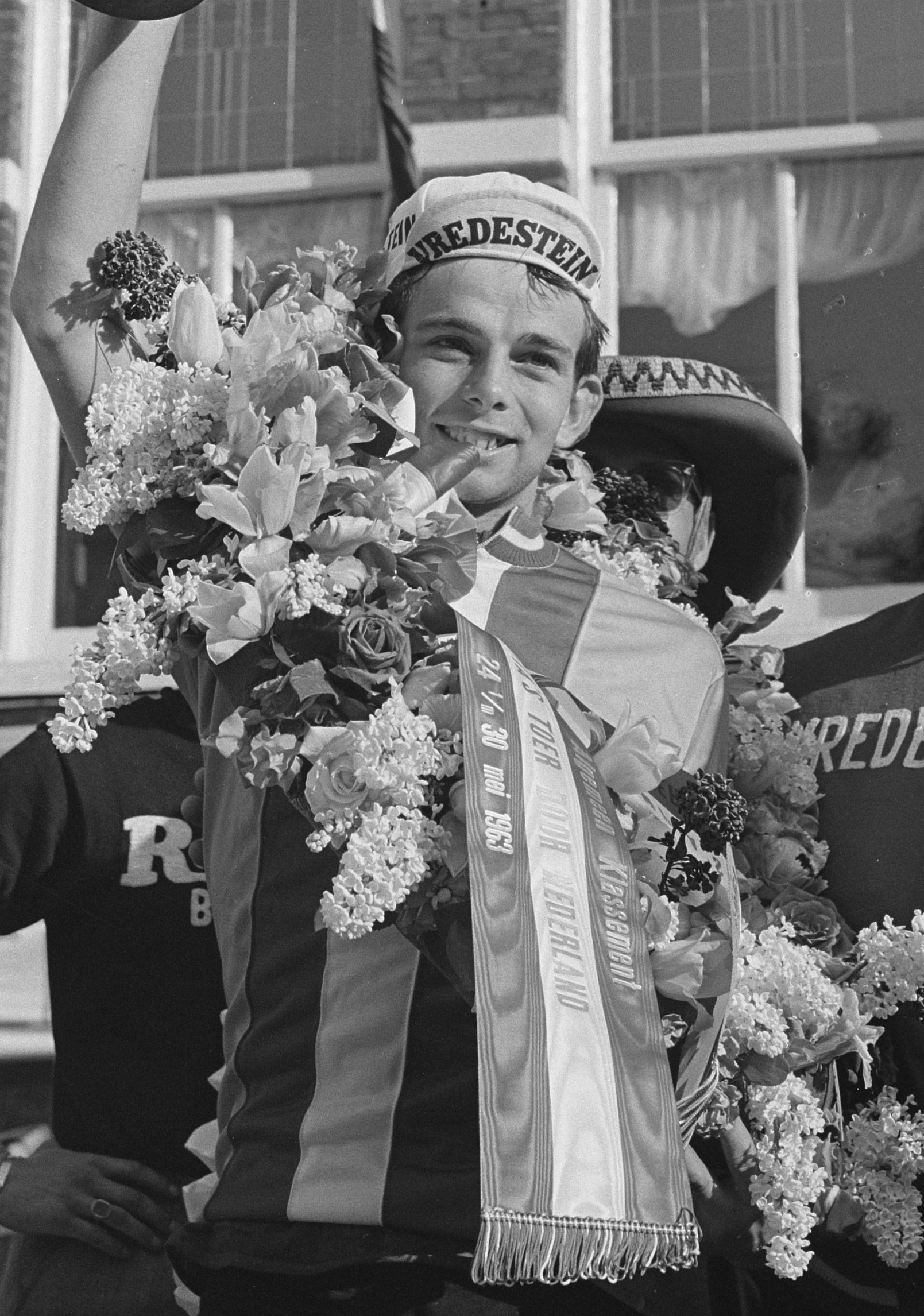
- Joseph Dries at the 1963 Olympia's Tour

Personal information
- Born: 2 August 1942 (age 83) Lille (Antwerpen), Belgium

Sport
- Sport: Cycling

Joseph Dries (born 2 August 1942) is a retired Belgian road cyclist who was active between 1962 and 1963. He won the Olympia's Tour in 1963 and one stage of Tour de Pologne in 1962.
