= Antonio Santoro =

Italian cyclist

Personal information
- Full name: Antonio Santoro
- Born: 13 September 1989 (age 37) Potenza, Italy
- Height: 1.67 m (5 ft 6 in)
- Weight: 53 kg (117 lb)

Cycling career
- Sport: Cycling
- Discipline: Road
- Role: Rider

Amateur teams
- 2008–2009: Marchiol–Liquigas–Site
- 2010: Mastromarco Chianti Sensi–Benedetti

Professional teams
- 2011–2012: Androni Giocattoli
- 2013: Ceramica Flaminia–Fondriest
- 2014: Meridiana–Kamen
- 2015: MG.K Vis–Vega
- 2016: Meridiana–Kamen
- 2017–2019: Monkey Town Continental Team
- 2020: Work Service–Dinatek–Vega

Antonio Santoro (born 13 September 1989 in Potenza) is an Italian cyclist, who most recently rode for UCI Continental team Work Service–Dinatek–Vega.

== Major results ==
2007
6th Overall Giro di Basilicata

1st Stage 2

8th Overall Giro della Lunigiana
2009
4th Trofeo Gianfranco Bianchin
4th Gran Premio Palio del Recioto
6th Trofeo Banca Popolare di Vicenza
2010
3rd Overall Girobio
6th Gran Premio San Giuseppe
6th Giro delle Valli Aretine
8th Trofeo Città di Brescia
2011
4th Circuito de Getxo
7th Overall Settimana Ciclistica Lombarda
9th Trofeo Melinda
2013
9th Overall Troféu Joaquim Agostinho
2014
1st Mountains classification Okolo Slovenska
5th Grand Prix Südkärnten
2015
8th Overall Szlakiem Grodów Piastowskich
10th Overall Giro della Regione Friuli Venezia Giulia
10th Trofeo Internazionale Bastianelli
10th Giro del Medio Brenta
2016
6th Overall Tour of Bihor
6th Giro dell'Appennino
2017
~~5th Overall Tour of Qinghai Lake~~
5th Overall Tour de Taiwan
7th Overall Flèche du Sud
2018
4th Overall Tour of Qinghai Lake
5th Overall Sibiu Cycling Tour
