= Yevgeni Popov (cyclist) =

Russian cyclist

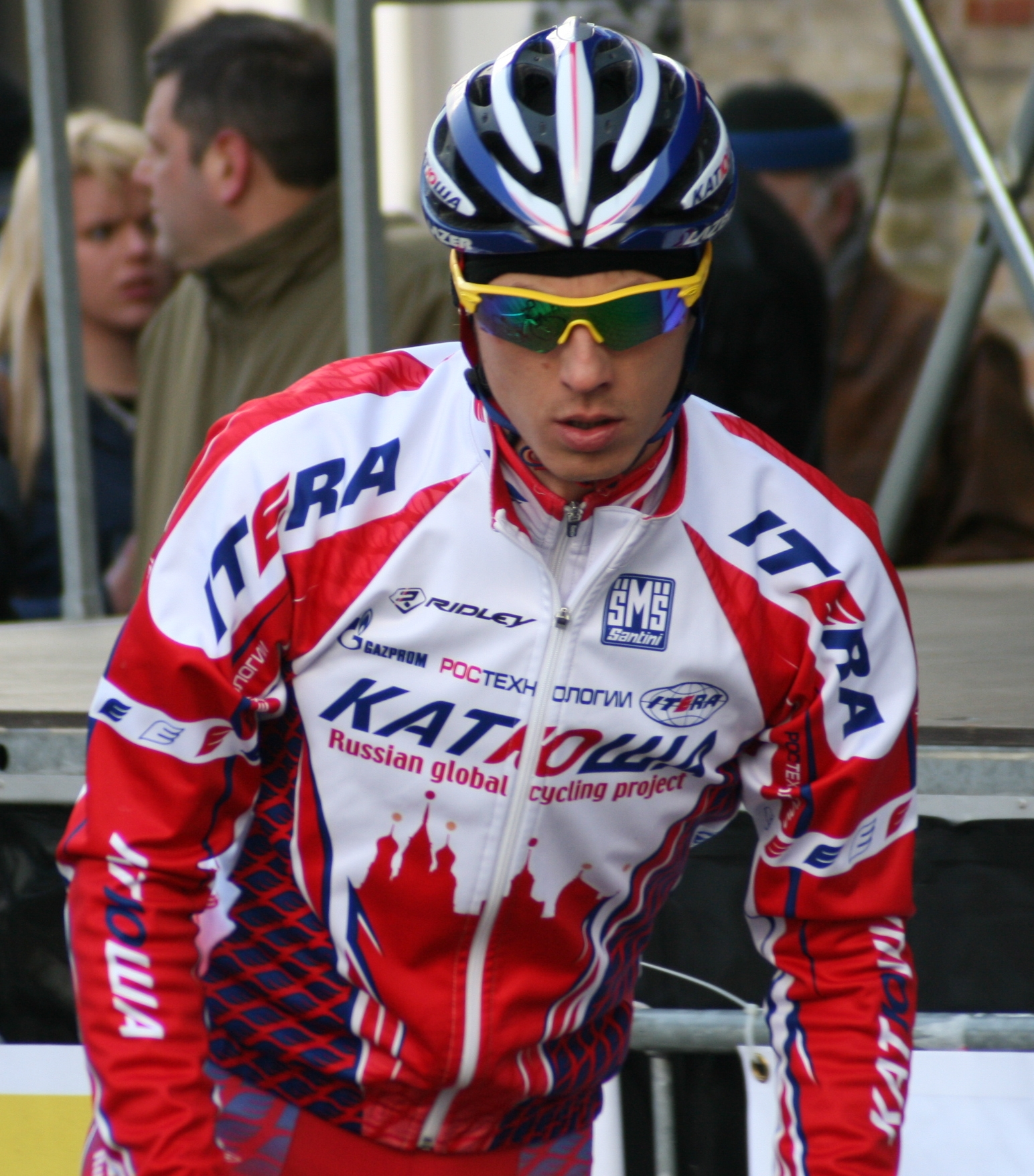
- Popov at the 2010 Driedaagse van West-Vlaanderen

Personal information
- Born: 18 September 1984 (age 42) Penza, Russia

Cycling career
- Sport: Cycling
- Discipline: Road
- Role: Rider

Professional teams
- 2006–2008: Rabobank Continental Team
- 2009: Katyusha Continental Team
- 2010–2011: Itera–Katusha

Yevgeni Popov (born 18 September 1984 in Penza) is a Russian former professional road cyclist.

== Major results ==
2003
1st Stage 4 Five Rings of Moscow
2005
1st Stage 1a Five Rings of Moscow
1st Stage 3 Triptyque des Barrages
2nd Road race, National Under-23 Road Championships
3rd Road race, UCI Under-23 Road World Championships
2006
1st Omloop der Kempen
2nd Ronde van Noord-Holland
6th Sparkassen Münsterland Giro
8th Paris–Tours Espoirs
2008
6th Omloop der Kempen
6th Vlaamse Havenpijl
2009
3rd Duo Normand (with Alexander Porsev)
