= Mik Snijder =

Dutch cyclist

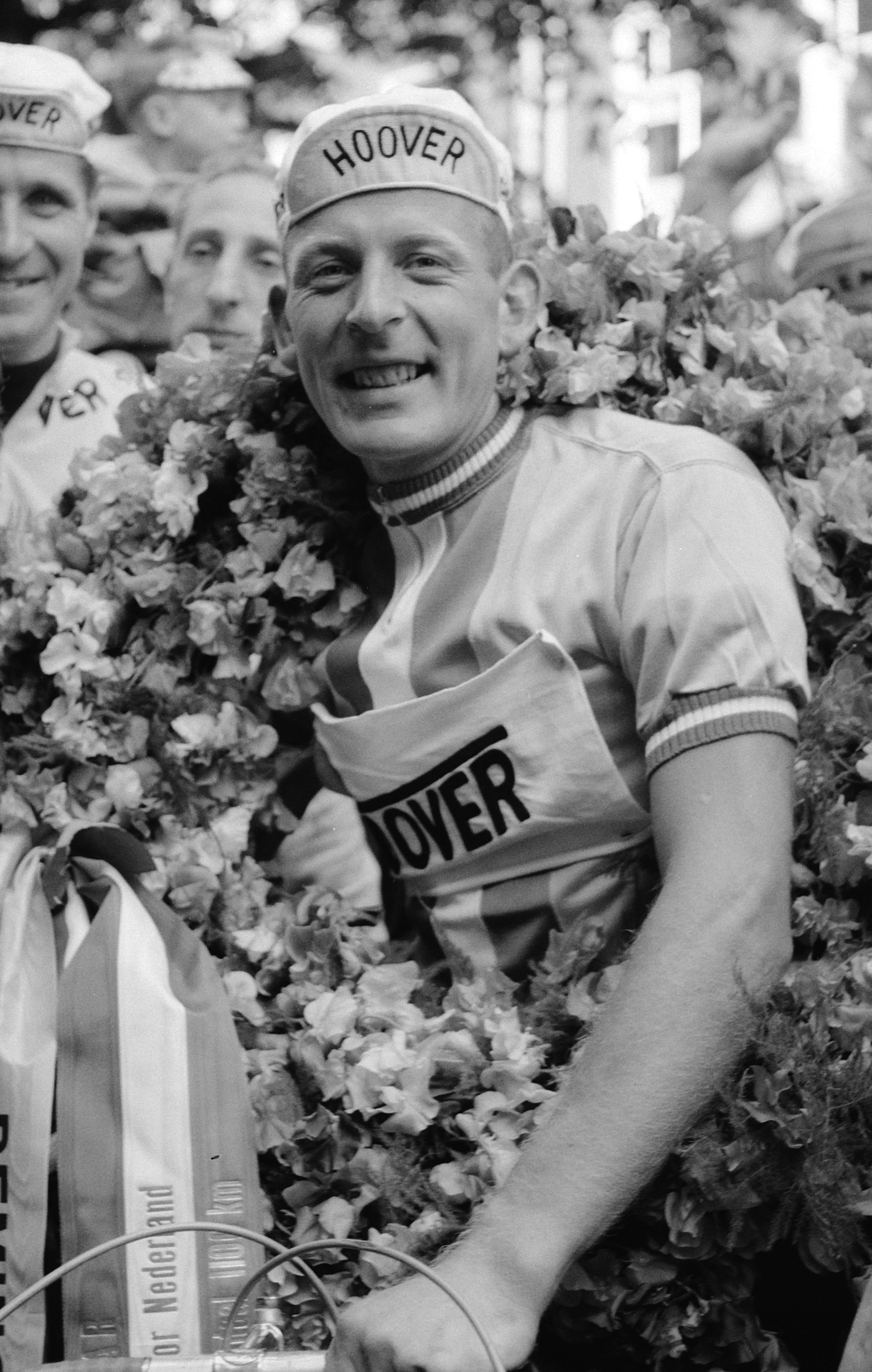
- Mik Snijder at the 1961 Olympia's Tour

Personal information
- Born: 6 February 1931 (age 95) Vries, Drenthe, the Netherlands

Sport
- Sport: Cycling

Mik Snijder (born 6 February 1931) is a retired Dutch road cyclist who was active between 1954 and 1961. He won the Ronde van Overijssel in 1954, the Olympia's Tour in 1961, and one stage of the Tour de Tunisie in 1960.
