= Job Vissers =

Dutch cyclist

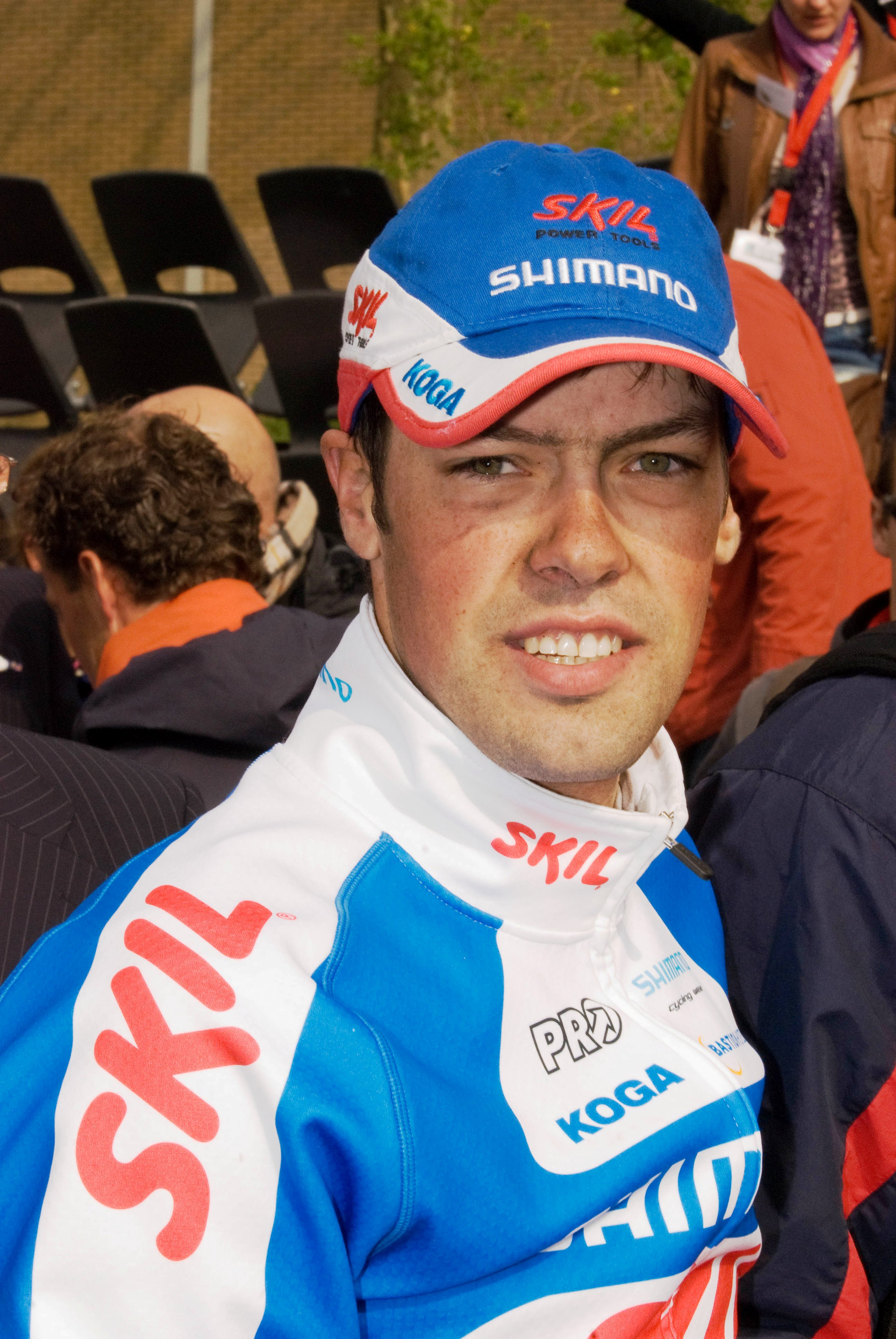

Personal information
- Born: 15 November 1984 (age 41) Veghel

Cycling career
- Sport: Cycling
- Current team: Retired
- Discipline: Road
- Role: Rider

Professional teams
- 2006: Team Löwik Meubelen
- 2009: Skil–Shimano (stagiaire)
- 2010: Skil–Shimano

Job Vissers (born 15 November 1984) is a Dutch cyclist.

== Palmares ==
2007
1st stage 1 Ronde van Midden-Brabant
2008
1st Omloop der Kempen
1st Omloop van de Hoekse Waard
2010
1st Ronde van Overijssel
