= Alecto Cycling Team =

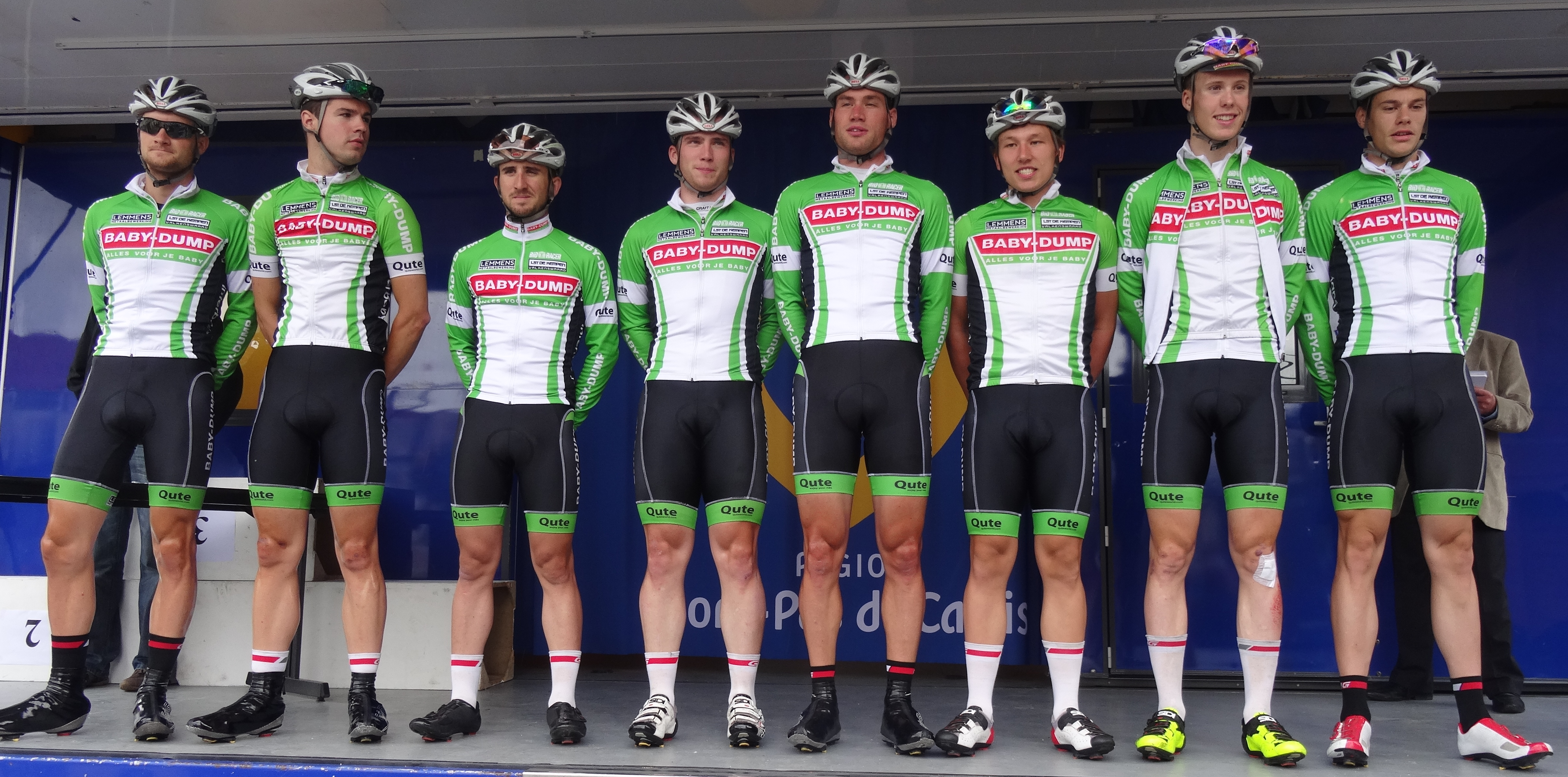
- Picture of Alecto Cycling Team in 2014

Team information
- Registered: Netherlands
- Founded: 2013
- Disbanded: 2019
- Discipline: Road
- Status: National (2010–2014); UCI Continental (2015–2019)

Key personnel
- General manager: Piet Rooijakkers

Team name history
- 2013–2014 2015–2017 2018–2019: Baby-Dump; Baby-Dump Cycling Team; Alecto Cycling Team

Alecto Cycling Team was a UCI Continental team based in the Netherlands. The team was active from 2013 to 2019, and held UCI Continental status from 2015 until its disbandment.-

== Team roster ==
As of 7 April 2019.

Rider	Date of birth
Abe Celi (NED)	13 October 1996 (age 29)
Robbert de Greef (NED)	27 August 1991 (age 35)
Adne Koster (NED)	24 August 2000 (age 26)
Marco Doets (NED)	28 October 1995 (age 30)
Mitch Groot (NED)	9 February 1998 (age 28)

Rider	Date of birth
René Hooghiemster (NED)	30 June 1986 (age 40)
Gijs Meijer (NED)	7 October 1998 (age 27)
Daan van Sintmaartensdijk (NED)	11 June 1998 (age 28)
Coen Vermeltfoort (NED)	11 April 1988 (age 38)

== Major wins ==
2017
Stage 3 Tour du Loir et Cher, Arvid De Kleijn
ZODC Zuidenveld Tour, Rick Ottema
Antwerpse Havenpijl, Arvid De Kleijn
Kernen Omloop Echt-Susteren, Robbert de Greef
Stage 2 Olympia's Tour, Patrick van der Duin
Stage 1 Tour of Iran (Azerbaijan), Koos Jeroen Kers
2018
Stage 4 Tour of Iran (Azerbaijan), Sjors Dekker
2019
Slag om Norg, Coen Vermeltfoort
