= Piet Kooyman =

Dutch road cyclist

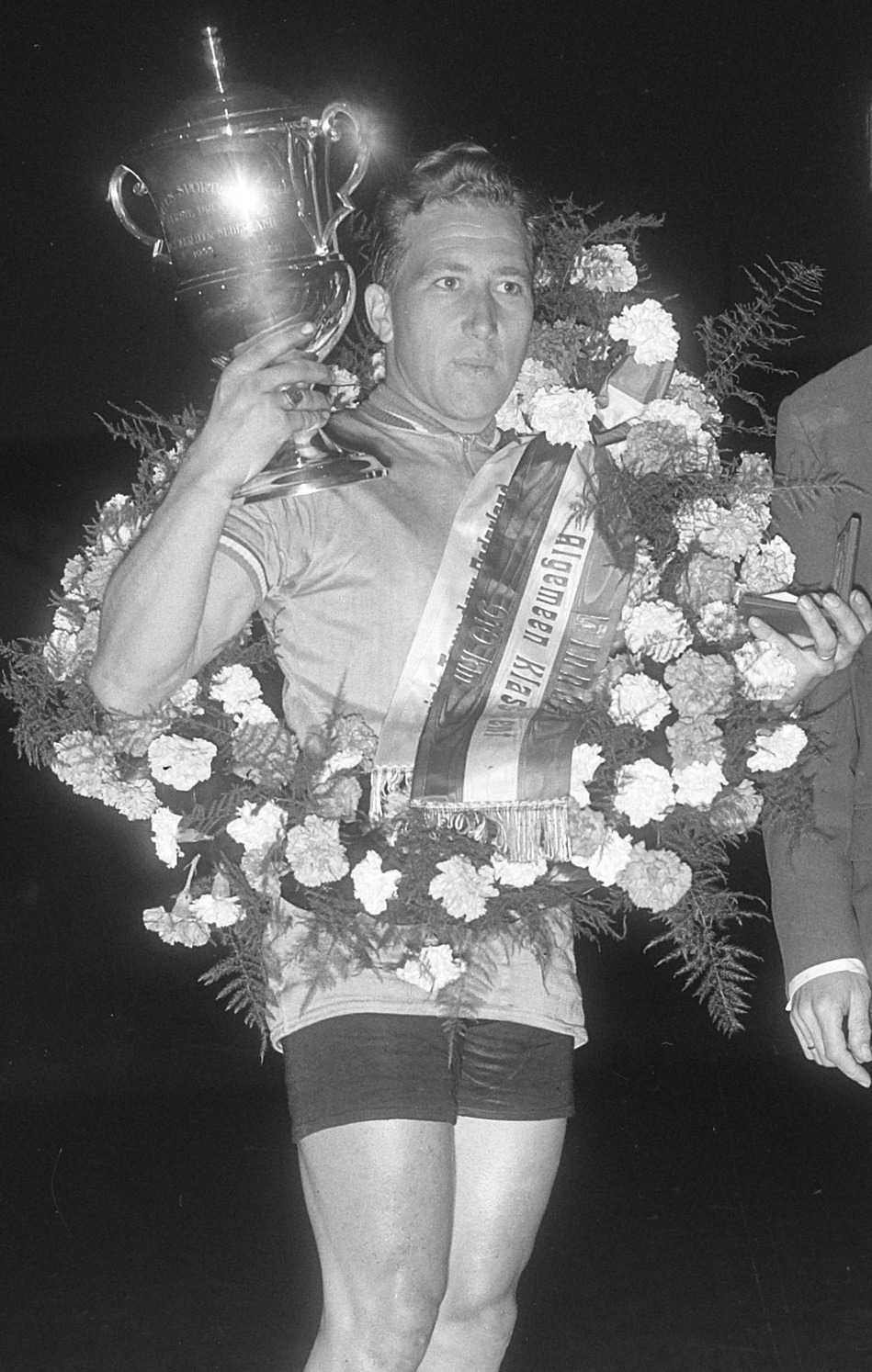
- Piet Kooyman at the 1955 Olympia's Tour

Personal information
- Born: 3 June 1929 The Hague, the Netherlands
- Died: 7 April 1988 (aged 58)

Sport
- Sport: Cycling

Piet Kooyman (3 June 1929 – 7 April 1988) was a Dutch road cyclist who was active between 1950 and 1957. He won the overall Olympia's Tour in 1955 and one stage of the Olympia's Tour in 1957.
