= Dwars door Gendringen =

Race details
- Date: August
- Region: Gendringen
- English name: Through Gendringen
- Discipline: Road
- Type: One-day race

History
- First edition: 1937
- Editions: 54
- Final edition: 2004
- First winner: Janus Hellemons (NED); Gerrit Schulte (NED)
- Final winner: Stefan van Dijk (NED)

Dwars door Gendringen was a cycling race held annually in Gendringen, Netherlands. It was disbanded in 2004.

== Winners ==
- 1937 : (Netherlands) Janus Hellemons (pro)
- 1937 : (Netherlands) Gerrit Schulte (amateur)
- 1938 : (Netherlands) Aad van Amsterdam (pro)
- 1938 : (Netherlands) Cees Hooyman (amateur)
- 1939 : (Netherlands) Aad van Amsterdam (pro)
- 1939 : (Netherlands) Gerrit Hoeke (amateur)
- 1951 : (Netherlands) Wim Snijders
- 1952 : (Netherlands) Henk van de Broek
- 1953 : (Netherlands) George de Korte
- 1954 : (Netherlands) Wim Kouwenberg
- 1955 : (Netherlands) Joop van der Putten
- 1956 : (Netherlands) Willy Gramser
- 1957 : (Netherlands) Cor van Engeland
- 1958 : (Netherlands) Jo de Haan
- 1959 : (Netherlands) Cees Lute
- 1960 : (Netherlands) Cees Lute
- 1961 : (Netherlands) Cees Lute
- 1962 : (Netherlands) Piet Rentmeester
- 1963 : (Netherlands) Eddy Pels
- 1964 : (Netherlands) Cor Schuuring
- 1965 : (Netherlands) Harry Steevens
- 1966 : (Netherlands) Henk Nieuwkamp
- 1967 : (Netherlands) Harrie Jansen
- 1968 : (Netherlands) Wim Holstede
- 1969 : (Netherlands) Henk Nieuwkamp
- 1970 : (Netherlands) Jan Bloed
- 1971 : (Netherlands) Arie Hassink
- 1972 : (Netherlands) Fedor den Hertog
- 1973 : (Netherlands) Herman Ponsteen
- 1974 : (Netherlands) Albert Scheffer
- 1975 : (Netherlands) Jan Huisjes
- 1976 : (Netherlands) Bram van der Stelt
- 1977 : (Netherlands) Gerrit Moehlmann
- 1978 : (Netherlands) Ben Verhagen
- 1979 : (Netherlands) Frits Schur
- 1980 : (Netherlands) Gerrit Moehlmann
- 1981 : (Netherlands) Arie Hassink
- 1982 : (Netherlands) Herman Snoeyink
- 1983 : (Netherlands) Piet Kleine
- 1984 : (Netherlands) Geert Verwaaijen
- 1985 : (Netherlands) Erik Cent
- 1986 : (Netherlands) Erik Cent
- 1987 : (Netherlands) Frank Rijkhoff
- 1988 : (Netherlands) Roel Palmers
- 1989 : (Netherlands) Herman Reesink
- 1990 : (Netherlands) John de Haas
- 1991 : (Netherlands) Jeroen Hermes
- 1992 : (Netherlands) Erwin Kistemaker
- 1993 : (Netherlands) Rob Froeling
- 1994 : (Netherlands) Rob Froeling
- 1995 : (Netherlands) Marcel Vrogten
- 1996 : (Sweden) Daniel Sjöberg
- 1997 : (Netherlands) Godert de Leeuw
- 1998 : (Netherlands) Servais Knaven
- 1999 : (Netherlands) Jeroen Blijlevens
- 2000 : (Netherlands) Kees Hopmans
- 2001 : (Lithuania) Mindaugas Goncaras
- 2002 : (Italy) Ivan Quaranta
- 2003 : (Italy) Alessandro Petacchi
- 2004 : (Netherlands) Stefan van Dijk
