= Gerard Wesseling =

Dutch road cyclist

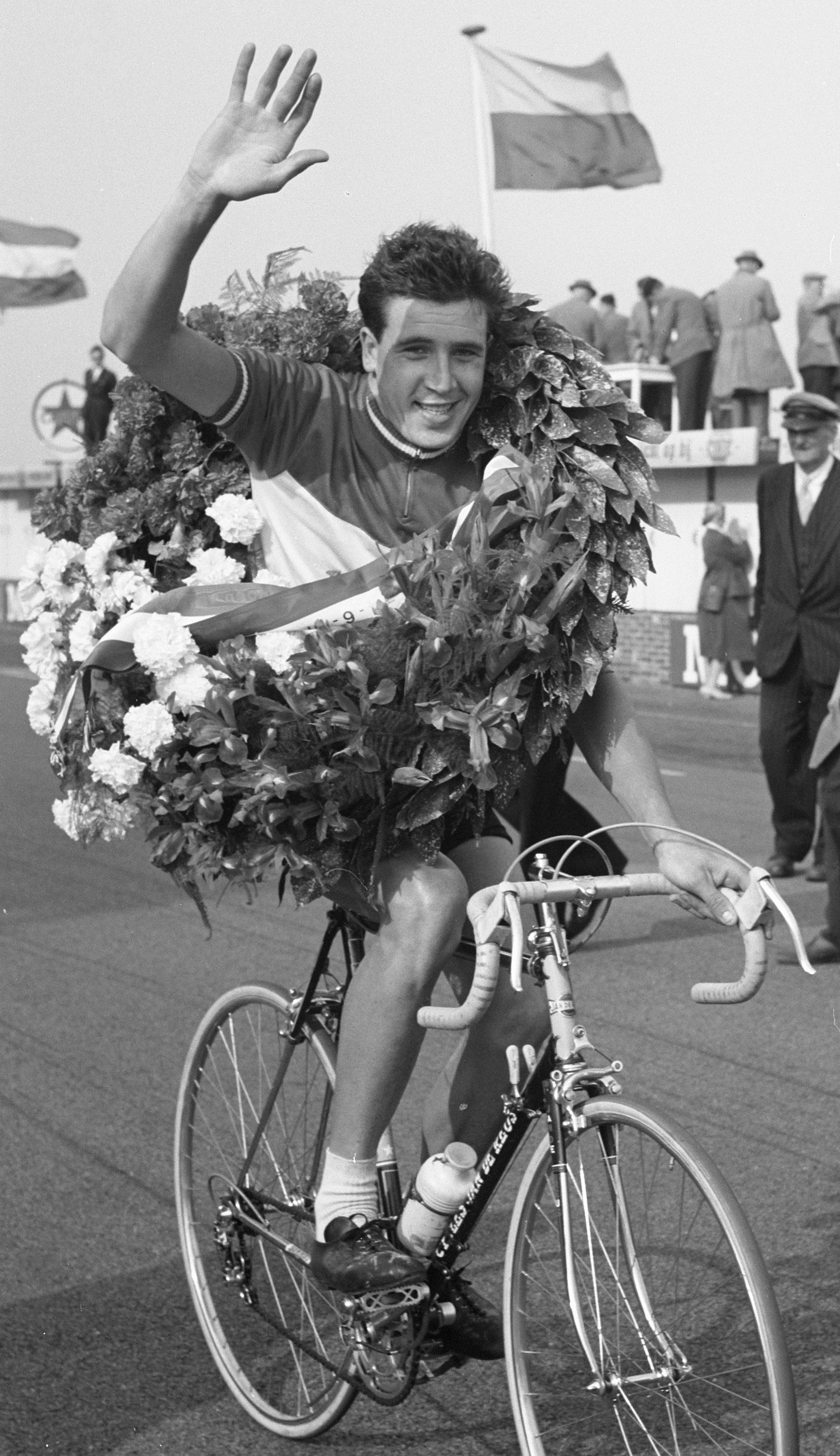
- Gerard Wesseling in 1961

Personal information
- Born: 10 August 1939 (age 86) Halfweg, the Netherlands

Sport
- Sport: Cycling

Gerard Wesseling (born 10 August 1939) is a retired Dutch road cyclist who was active between 1959 and 1965. He competed at the Olympia's Tour in 1960–62, and won the overall race in 1960, one stage in 1961, and one stage in 1962. In 1961 he won the Dutch championship for amateurs at Zandvoort. In 1961 he also won two stages of the Tour of Tunisia.
