= Yvan Frebert =

French cyclist

Personal information
- Born: 19 November 1960 (age 65) Évreux, France

Cycling career
- Sport: Cycling
- Role: Rider

Yvan Frebert (born 19 November 1960) is a French former professional racing cyclist. He rode in two editions of the Tour de France.
