= René Hooghiemster =

Dutch bicycle racer

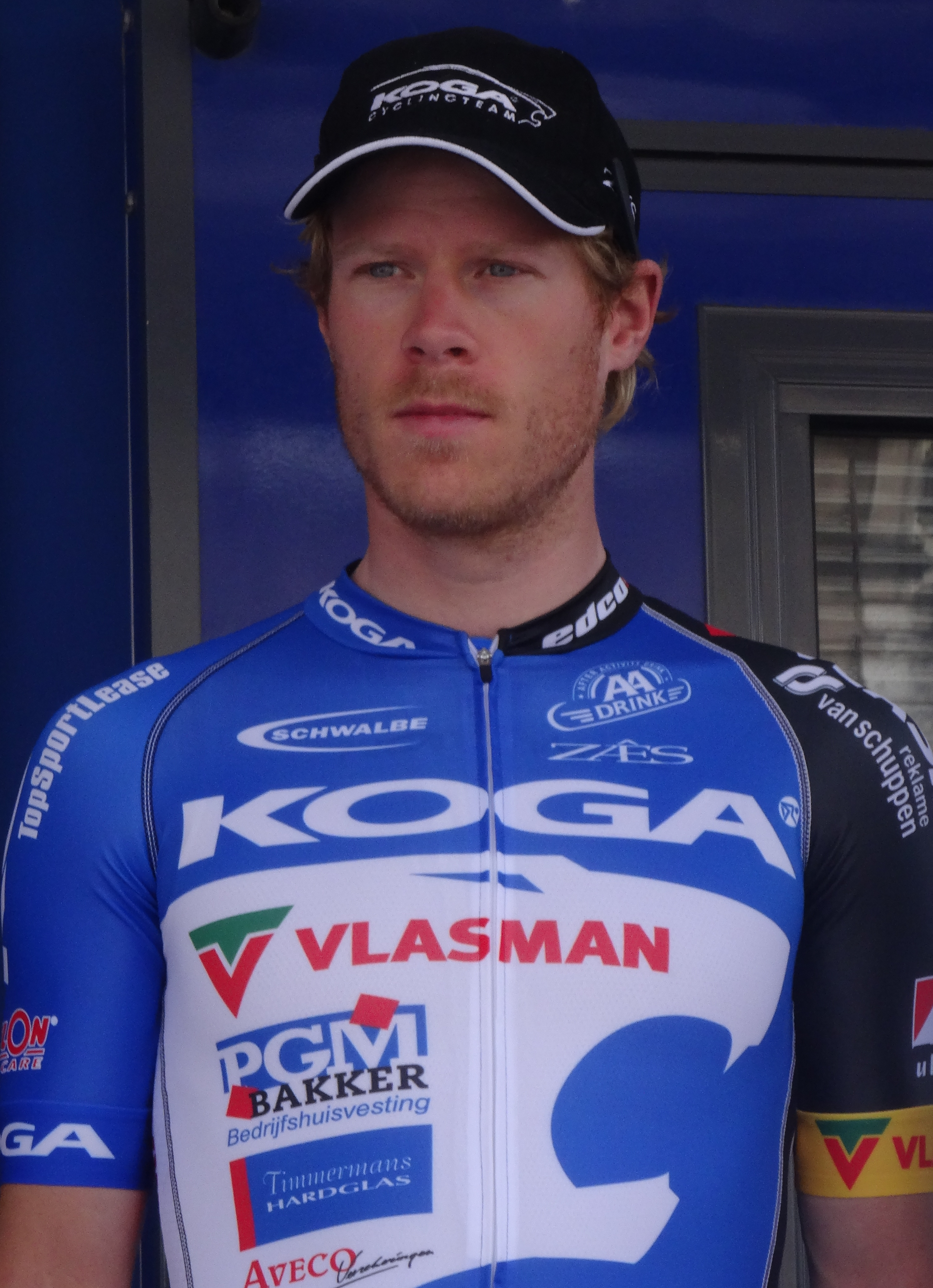
- Hooghiemster in 2014

Personal information
- Full name: René Hooghiemster
- Born: 30 July 1986 (age 40) Tytsjerk, Netherlands

Cycling career
- Sport: Cycling
- Current team: Retired
- Discipline: Road
- Role: Rider

Amateur teams
- 2009: Van Hemert Groep–De Jonge Renner
- 2010: Midi Center–Ruiter Dakkapellen

Professional teams
- 2007: Team Löwik Meubelen
- 2011: Ubbink–Koga
- 2012–2013: Team NSP–Ghost
- 2014: Koga Cycling Team
- 2015–2019: Baby-Dump Cyclingteam
- 2020: P&S Metalltechnik

René Hooghiemster (born 30 July 1986) is a Dutch former professional cyclist, who rode professionally in 2007 and from 2011 to 2020 for the Löwik Meubelen, Team NSP–Ghost, Koga Cycling Team, Alecto Cycling Team and P&S Metalltechnik teams.

== Major results ==
2011
1st Stage 1 Tour du Loir-et-Cher
2nd Arno Wallaard Memorial
2013
8th Overall Tour du Loir-et-Cher
2018
5th GP Horsens
