= Ab van Egmond =

Dutch road cyclist

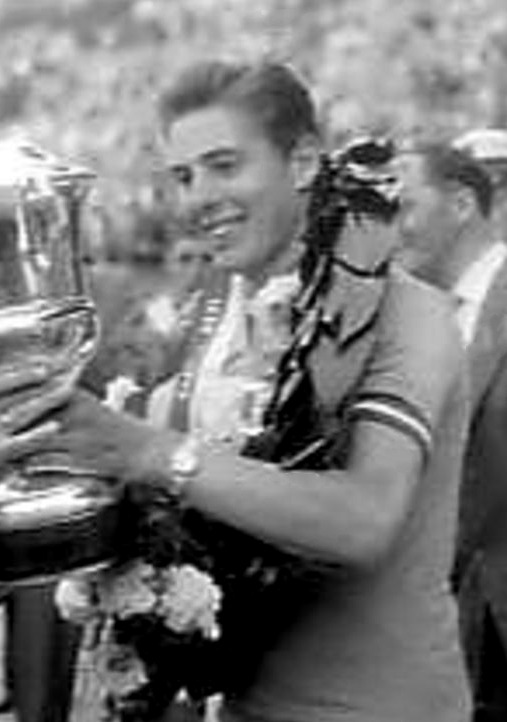
- Ab van Egmond at the 1958 Olympia's Tour

Personal information
- Born: 25 August 1938 (age 87) The Hague, the Netherlands

Sport
- Sport: Cycling

Ab van Egmond (born 25 August 1938) was a Dutch road cyclist who was active between 1956 and 1963. He won the Olympia's Tour in 1958.
