= Arie Hassink =

Dutch cyclist (born 1950)

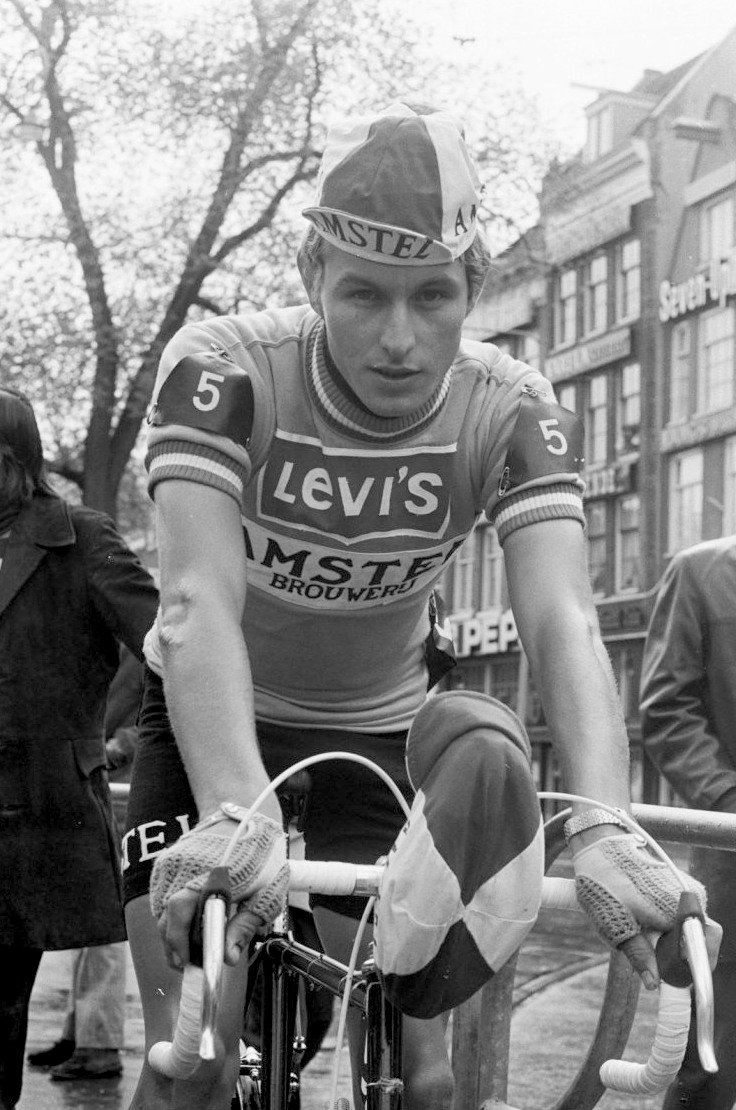
- Arie Hassink in 1972

Personal information
- Born: 9 December 1950 (age 75) Neede, the Netherlands
- Height: 1.84 m (6 ft 0 in)
- Weight: 71 kg (157 lb)

Sport
- Sport: Cycling

Achievements and titles
- Olympic finals: 1976

Arend Hendrik "Arie" Hassink (born 9 December 1950) is a retired Dutch cyclist who was active between 1969 and 1983. He competed at the 1976 Summer Olympics in the 100 km team time trial and individual road race and finished in 17th and 25th place, respectively.

Hassink won the Omloop der Kempen (1971 and 1976), Rund um Köln (1978) and the Olympia's Tour (1977 and 1978); he also won individual stages of the Olympia's Tour in 1972, 1973, 1976 and 1982.

His daughter Areke and son Arne also became professional cyclists.

== See also ==
- List of Dutch Olympic cyclists
