= Delta Cycling Rotterdam =

Dutch cycling team

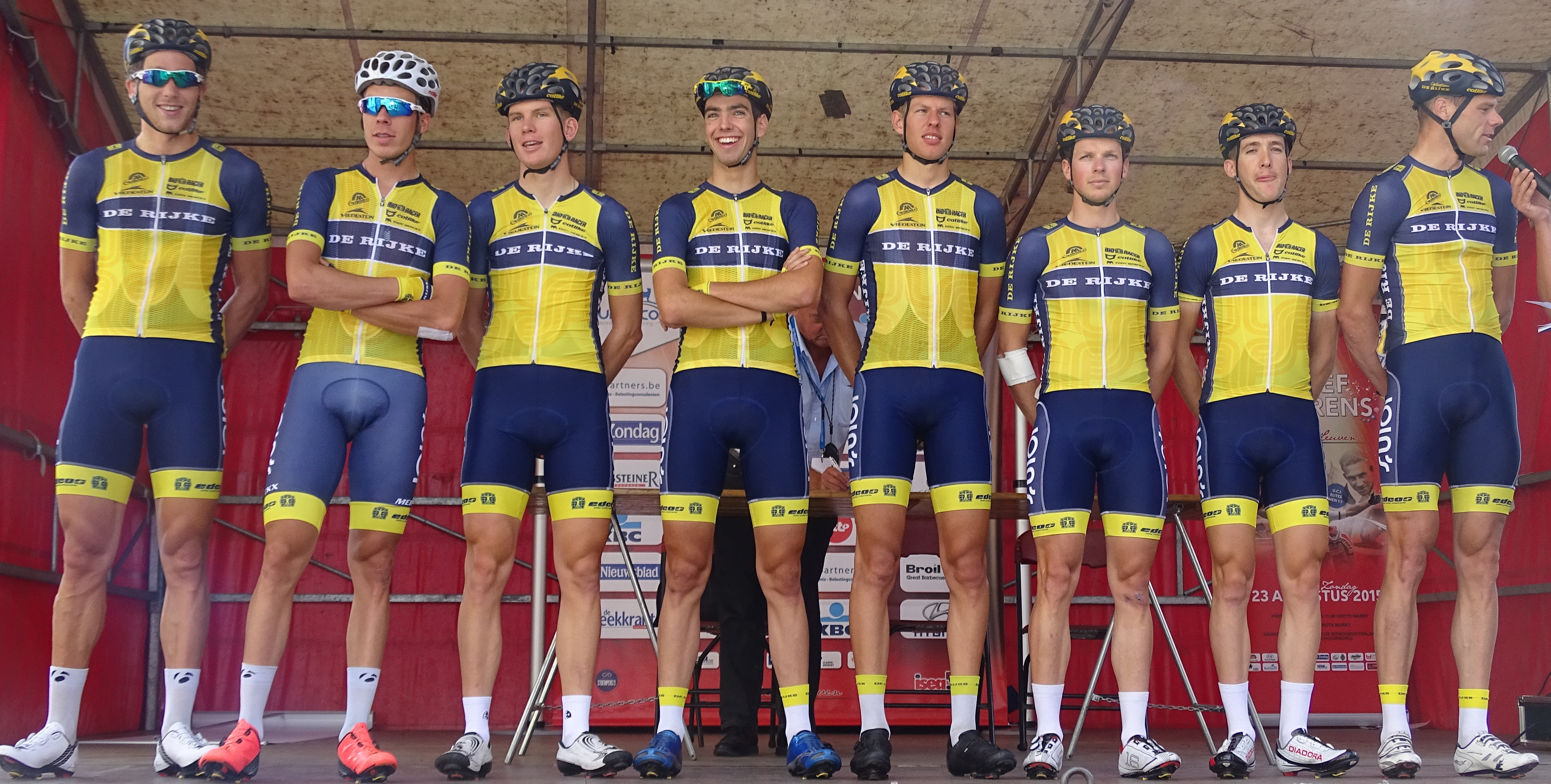

Team information
- UCI code: DCR
- Registered: Netherlands
- Founded: 2003
- Disbanded: 2018
- Discipline: Road
- Status: Continental

Key personnel
- Team manager: Iwan van Zandbeek

Team name history
- 2003–2007 2008–2010 2011–2012 2013 2014–2016 2017–2018: Van Vliet–EBH Advocaten; Van Vliet–EBH Elshof; Cycling Team De Rijke; Cycling Team De Rijke–Shanks; Cyclingteam de Rijke; Delta Cycling Rotterdam

Delta Cycling Rotterdam was a Dutch professional cycling team. In 2008, it holds a Continental license. The team started in 2003. Among the riders that first year were current professional cyclists Rick Flens and Martijn Maaskant. In 2004, Tom Leezer and Sebastiaan Langeveld. Floris Goesinnen also rode for Van Vliet.

Johnny Hoogerland, Bram Schmitz and Joost van Leijen are the most successful riders in the team history.

In 2008, Ronan van Zandbeek became Dutch road champion with the espoirs.

In 2010 the team is sponsored by Focus Bikes.

== Team roster ==
Rider	Date of birth
Sjoerd Bax (NED)	6 January 1996 (age 30)
Luuc Bugter (NED)	10 July 1993 (age 33)
Lucas Eamon (USA)	15 October 1992 (age 33)
Ike Groen (NED)	31 May 1992 (age 34)
Vincent Hoppezak (NED)	2 February 1999 (age 27)
Adriaan Janssen (NED)	12 December 1995 (age 30)
Gijs Meijer (NED)	7 October 1998 (age 27)
Gerco Pastoor (NED)	17 May 1998 (age 28)

Rider	Date of birth
Justin Timmermans (NED)	25 September 1996 (age 29)
Rens Tulner (NED)	26 February 1998 (age 28)
Jason van Dalen (NED)	2 July 1994 (age 32)
Jens van den Dool (NED)	10 November 1998 (age 27)
Marijn Van Der Berg (NED)	19 July 1999 (age 27)

== Major wins ==
2003
ZLM Tour, Angelo van Melis
Stage 3 Olympia's Tour, Martijn Maaskant
2005
Stage 7 Olympia's Tour, Sebastian Langeveld
2007
Stage 1 & 3 Cinturón a Mallorca, Bram Schmitz
Overall Okolo Slovenska, Joost van Leijen

Stage 2, Johnny Hoogerland
Stage 3, Joost van Leijen

2008
De Vlaamse Pijl, Bram Schmitz
Rund um Düren, Bram Schmitz
Stage 1 Tour de Hokkaido, Manman van Ruitenbeek
Stage 4 Tour de Hokkaido, Joost van Leijen
Stage 3 Clásico Ciclístico Banfoandes, Johnny Hoogerland
2009
Overall Tour de Normandie, Bram Schmitz
2010
Overall Tour de Normandie, Ronan van Zandbeek
Stage 5 Ringerike GP, Christoph Pfingsten
2011
Stage 1 Mi-Août Bretonne, Kai Reus
2012
Stage 4 Tour de Normandie, Yoeri Havik
Stage 7 Tour de Normandie, Dion Beukeboom
2013
Arno Wallaard Memorial, Coen Vermeltfoort
Ronde van Noord-Holland, Dylan Groenewegen
Himmerland Rundt, Yoeri Havik
Grote 1-MeiPrijs, Coen Vermeltfoort
Prologue Olympia's Tour, Coen Vermeltfoort
Prologue Volta a Portugal, Team time trial
Kernen Omloop Echt-Susteren, Dylan Groenewegen
2014
Stage 2 Tour de Normandie, Dylan Groenewegen
Stage 4 Circuit des Ardennes, Coen Vermeltfoort
Prologue Olympia's Tour, Coen Vermeltfoort
Stage 1 (ITT) Flèche du Sud, Christoph Pfingsten
Stages 2, 4 & 5 Flèche du Sud, Coen Vermeltfoort
Antwerpse Havenpijl, Yoeri Havik
2015
Overall Olympia's Tour, Jetse Bol

Stage 2, Jetse Bol

2016
Stage 1 Tour of Mersin, Jan-Willem van Schip
Stage 3 Tour of Mersin, Ike Groen
Stages 1 & 5 Flèche du Sud, Coen Vermeltfoort
Stage 1 An Post Rás, Taco van der Hoorn
Stage 5 An Post Rás, Wouter Mol
Kernen Omloop Echt-Susteren, Daan Meijers
Grote Prijs Marcel Kint, Jan-Willem van Schip
2017
Ronde van Drenthe, Jan-Willem van Schip
Stage 3 Tour de Normandie, Jan-Willem van Schip
Stage 2 An Post Rás, Jan-Willem van Schip
Stage 7 An Post Rás, Daan Meijers
Numansdorp Criterium, Jordi Talen
Stage 2 Okolo Jižních Čech, Jason van Dalen
Stage 3 Okolo Jižních Čech, Jan-Willem van Schip
Netherlands National Track Championships (Omnium), Jan-Willem van Schip
2018
Overall Rás Tailteann, Luuc Bugter

Stage 3, Luuc Bugter
Stage 4, Jason van Dalen

Stage 3b Sibiu Cycling Tour, Jason van Dalen

== National Champions ==
2017
Netherlands National Track Championships (Omnium), Jan-Willem Van Schip
