= Olympia's Tour =

Dutch multi-day road cycling race

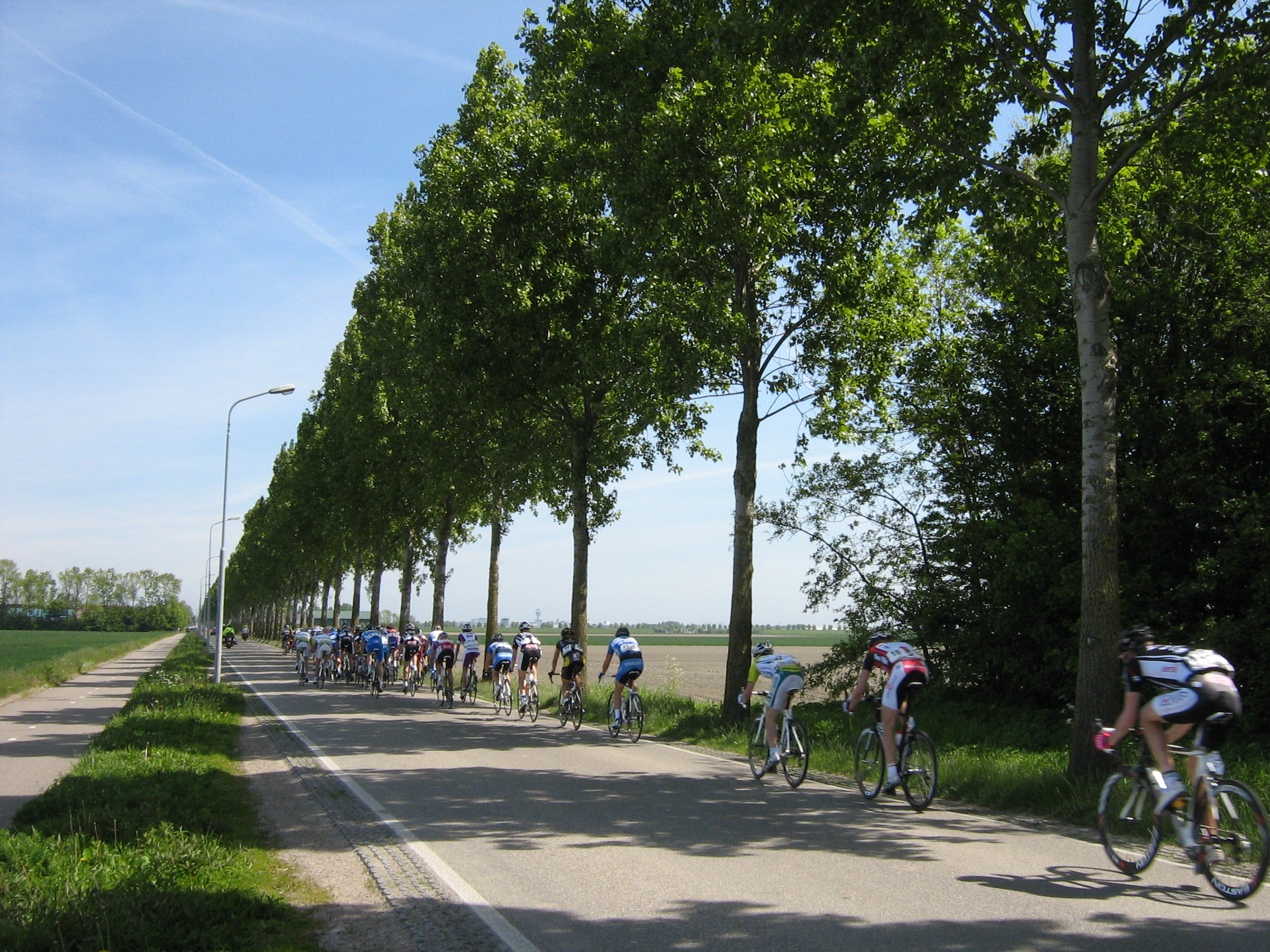

Race details
- Date: May (1962–2015); September (2016–2019); March (2022–)
- Region: Netherlands
- Local name: Olympia's Tour
- Discipline: Road race
- Competition: UCI Europe Tour
- Type: Stage race
- Web site: www.olympiastour.com

History
- First edition: 1909
- Editions: 72 (as of 2026)
- First winner: Chris Kalkman (NED)
- Most wins: Jetse Bol (NED) (3 wins)
- Most recent: Mads Andersen (DEN)

The Olympia's Tour is a cycling stage race held in the Netherlands.

== History ==
A.S.C. Olympia was founded in Amsterdam on 27 November 1898. It ran one-day races but wanted a race through all the Netherlands. The first Olympia's Tour was in 1909, with three stages and one rest day. The second in 1910 went to Maastricht and Groningen. It was 17 years before the third race, partly because races on public roads were forbidden in the Netherlands during the First World War. An international field with 16 Germans, the champions of Switzerland and Luxembourg and around 40 Dutch riders left the Rembrandtplein on 17 August 1927. The Dutch were mainly amateurs, the Germans sponsored riders who rode for bicycle manufacturers such as Opel and Diamant which provided material and a support team. The German Rudolf Wolke won after four stages and 800 kilometres ahead of Janus Braspennincx. It was the last race until 1955.

The race resumed on 17 June 1955, with 93 riders leaving Stadionplein in Amsterdam South for a stage of 212 km to Hoogeveen. The race was a battle until the end, when 26-year-old Piet Kooyman won. After 1955 the race was held every year except 2001, when it was stopped by a foot-and-mouth disease crisis, and the COVID-19 pandemic in the Netherlands cancelled the 2020 and 2021 editions of the race.

Some winners have become successful professionals. They include Henk Nijdam, Frits Schür, Cees Priem, Fedor den Hertog, Leo van Vliet, John Talen, Servais Knaven, Danny Nelissen, Matthé Pronk, Joost Posthuma and Thomas Dekker.

== Past winners ==
Year	Country	Rider	Team
1909	Netherlands	Chris Kalkman	
1910	Netherlands	Adrie Bellersen	
1911– 1926	No race		
1927	Germany	Rudolf Wolke	
1928– 1954	No race		
1955	Netherlands	Piet Kooyman	
1956	Netherlands	Cees Van Der Zande	
1957	Netherlands	Adrie Roks	
1958	Netherlands	Ab van Egmond	
1959	Netherlands	Huub Zilverberg	
1960	Netherlands	Gerard Wesseling	
1961	Netherlands	Mik Snijder	
1962	Netherlands	Henk Nijdam	
1963	Belgium	Joseph Dries	
1964	Netherlands	Cor Schuuring	
1965	Netherlands	Harry Steevens	
1966	Netherlands	Jan van der Horst	
1967	Netherlands	Cees Zoontjens	
1968	Netherlands	Leen de Groot	
1969	Netherlands	Piet Legierse	
1970	Netherlands	Frits Schür	
1971	Netherlands	Cees Priem	
1972	Netherlands	Frits Schür	
1973	Netherlands	Fedor den Hertog	
1974	Netherlands	Roy Schuiten	
1975	Netherlands	Hans Langerijs	
1976	Netherlands	Leo van Vliet	
1977	Netherlands	Arie Hassink	
1978	Netherlands	Arie Hassink	
1979	Netherlands	Jos Lammertink	
1980	Soviet Union	Oleg Logvin	
1981	Netherlands	Geert Schipper	
1982	Netherlands	Gerrit Solleveld	
1983	East Germany	Mario Hering	
1984	Soviet Union	Asiat Saitov	
1985	Netherlands	John Talen	
1986	East Germany	Berndt Dittert	
1987	Netherlands	Jos Bol	
1988	East Germany	Dirk Meier	
1989	East Germany	Thomas Liese	
1990	Netherlands	Wilco Zuijderwijk	
1991	Netherlands	Anton Tak	
1992	Netherlands	Servais Knaven	
1993	Netherlands	Servais Knaven	
1994	Australia	Henk Vogels	
1995	Netherlands	Danny Nelissen	
1996	Italy	Cristiano Citton	
1997	Netherlands	Remco van der Ven	
1998	Netherlands	Matthé Pronk	Rabobank
1999	Netherlands	Marcel Duijn	Rabobank
2000	Netherlands	Jan van Velzen	BankGiroLoterij–Batavus
2001	No race		
2002	Netherlands	Mart Louwers	Rabobank GS3
2003	Netherlands	Joost Posthuma	Rabobank GS3
2004	Netherlands	Thomas Dekker	Rabobank GS3
2005	Netherlands	Stef Clement	Rabobank Continental Team
2006	Netherlands	Tom Veelers	Rabobank Continental Team
2007	Netherlands	Thomas Berkhout	Rabobank Continental Team
2008	Netherlands	Lars Boom	Rabobank Continental Team
2009	Netherlands	Jetse Bol	Rabobank Continental Team
2010	United States	Taylor Phinney	Trek–Livestrong
2011	Netherlands	Jetse Bol	Rabobank Continental Team
2012	Netherlands	Dylan van Baarle	Rabobank Continental Team
2013	Netherlands	Dylan van Baarle	Rabobank Development Team
2014	Netherlands	Berden de Vries	Cycling Team Jo Piels
2015	Netherlands	Jetse Bol	Cyclingteam de Rijke
2016	Netherlands	Cees Bol	Rabobank Development Team
2017	Netherlands	Pascal Eenkhoorn	BMC Development Team
2018	Denmark	Julius Johansen	Team ColoQuick
2019	Belgium	Sander De Pestel	Lotto–Soudal U23
2020	No race due to the COVID-19 pandemic in the Netherlands		
2021	No race due to the COVID-19 pandemic in the Netherlands		
2022	Netherlands	Maikel Zijlaard	VolkerWessels Cycling Team
2023	Denmark	Mathias Bregnhøj	Leopard TOGT Pro Cycling
2024	Germany	Tim Torn Teutenberg	Lidl–Trek Future Racing
2025	France	Antoine L'Hote	Decathlon–AG2R La Mondiale Development Team
2026	Denmark	Mads Andersen	Swatt Club
