= Roel Coutinho =

Dutch physician

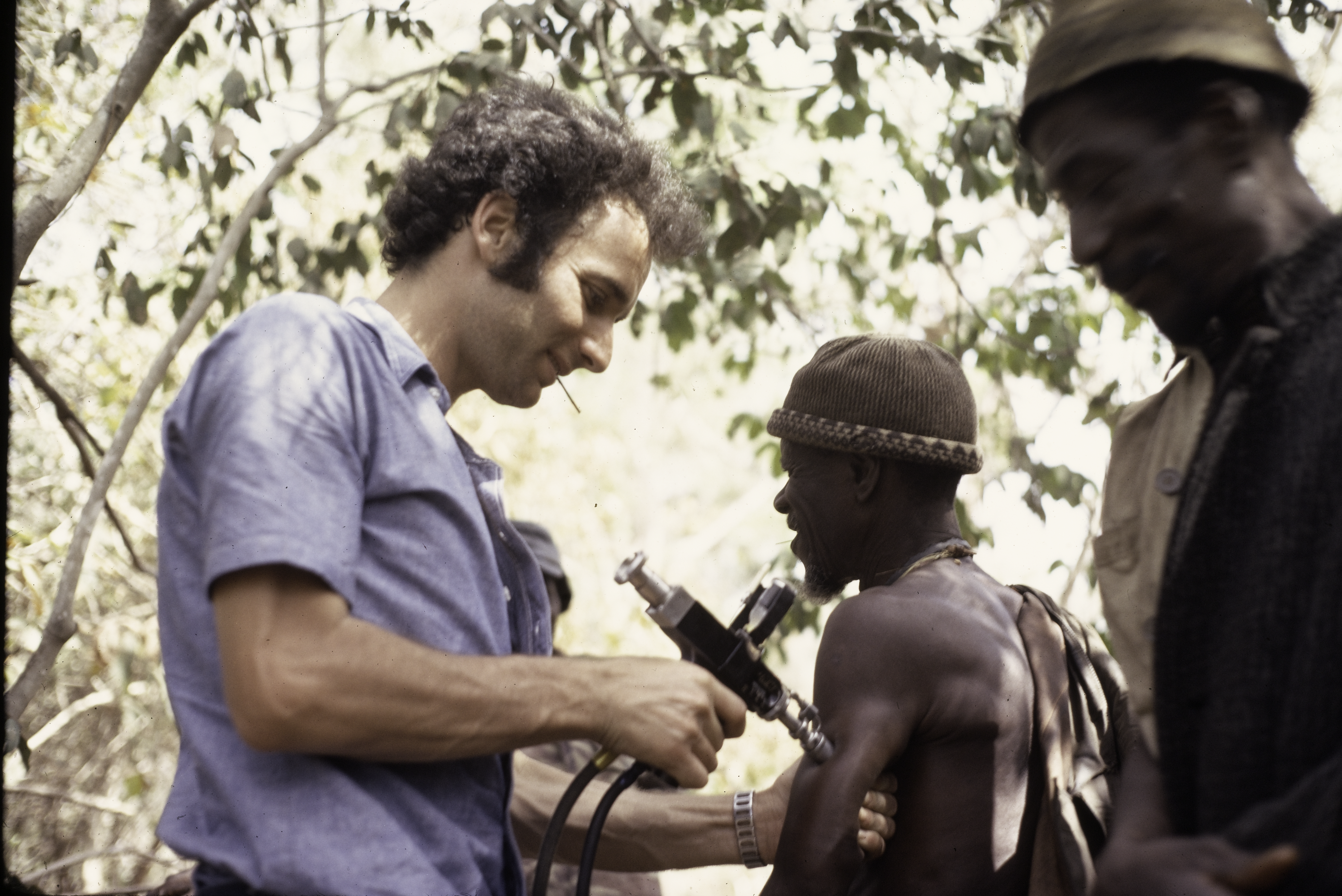
- Coutinho vaccinating PAIGC cadre in Ziguinchor, Senegal, 1973
- Born: April 4, 1946 (age 79); Laren, North Holland
- Occupations: Microbiologist, physician
- Known for: Contributions towards infectious disease control

Roel Coutinho (born 4 April 1946) is a Dutch medical doctor, microbiologist and former director of the Centre for the Control of Infectious Diseases, part of the National Institute for Public Health and the Environment.

== Biography ==
After finishing a medical degree in Amsterdam in 1972, Coutinho worked in tropical medicine in Guinea-Bissau and Senegal. During this time, he worked in the areas liberated by the African Party for the Independence of Guinea and Cape Verde during the latter stages of the Guinea-Bissau War of Independence. His work brought him into contact with future leaders of Guinea-Bissau, such as Francisco Mendes and Luís Cabral. He subsequently worked on the eradication of smallpox in Bangladesh, the last major outbreak of the disease, the experience of which led him to focus on public health and infectious diseases for his future career.

Upon returning to the Netherlands he specialised in microbiology and in 1977 became head of the Public Health Department of the Amsterdam Municipal Health Service. He completed an internship with the Centers for Disease Control (CDC) in the United States and with the emergence of HIV/AIDS he worked on its suppression. In 1984 he completed his doctorate with a thesis on sexually transmitted diseases amongst men who have sex with men.

In 1989 Coutinho was appointed professor of epidemiology at the Academic Medical Centre of the University of Amsterdam. In 2000, he became co-editor of AIDS, the official journal of the International AIDS Society. In February 2005 he joined the National Institute for Public Health and the Environment as director of the Centre for Infectious Disease Control.

In May 2011 he was appointed professor of life sciences at Utrecht University. In August 2013 he was succeeded by Jaap van Dissel as head of the Department of Infectious Diseases at the Leiden University Medical Centre following Coutinho's retirement in April.

In 2021, Coutinho was critical of the slowness in the Dutch government's response to vaccinating the population during the COVID-19 pandemic.

In 2022, his recollections and photographs of his time in Guinea-Bissau were published under the title "Guinea-Bissau's struggle for freedom through the eyes of a young doctor". A review of the work, noted, "the power of Coutinho’s account of the independence struggle in Guinea-Bissau lies in the sober description of the daily practice of the armed struggle."
