= Aura Timen =

Netherlands-based Romanian medical doctor

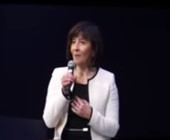
Timen in 2020

Aura Timen (born 1966) is a Romanian medical doctor based in the Netherlands. She is head of the department of primary care and professor of primary and community care at Radboud University Nijmegen.

== Early years and education ==
Timen has a degree in medicine from Babeș-Bolyai University in Cluj-Napoca, Romania (1991), but moved to the Netherlands in 1992 and had to requalify so also has a medical degree from Vrije Universiteit Amsterdam (1995). She has a PhD from Radboud University Nijmegen in the Netherlands (2010), where her thesis was on "Outbreak management: towards a model for the next crisis".

== Career ==
Radboud took up a post with the Netherlands' National Coordination Centre for Outbreak Management, (LCI, Landelijke Coördinatie Infectieziektebestrijding, part of RIVM, the National Institute for Public Health and the Environment), in 2000, and was its head from 2011 to 2022. There she led the country's response to the COVID-19 pandemic in the Netherlands.

Between 2017 and 2022 she led the World Health Organization's Collaborating Centre for Infectious Disease Preparedness and IHR monitoring and response.

In 2022, on taking up her post at Radboud, she said "With the conviction that public health does not end where healthcare begins, I want to turn the lessons of the corona crisis into research questions for the better care of the future."

== Recognition ==
In 2020, de Volkskrant listed Timen as number 17 in its annual list of the 200 most influential people in the Netherlands.
