= Overgoor =

Overgoor is a Dutch surname. Notable people with the surname include:

- Henk Overgoor (1944–2020), Dutch footballer
- Sjoerd Overgoor (born 1988), Dutch footballer
