= Herstel-NL =

Dutch group opposed to COVID-19 lockdown

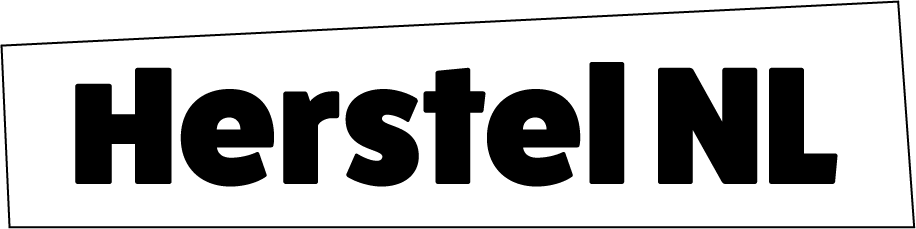
Logo of the Dutch organization Herstel NL

Herstel-NL (English: "Recovery-NL", also written as Herstel.NL and Herstel NL) is a Dutch organization that presented a plan in February 2021 to reopen Dutch society instead of continuing the hard lockdown that was introduced in December as a measure to combat the COVID-19 pandemic in the Netherlands. Herstel-NL was created as a result of an April 2020 article by economist and political scientist Robin Fransman about the costs and benefits of the coronavirus crisis measures in the magazine Economisch Statistische Berichten.

== Public call and national public campaign ==
The organization initially consisted of Fransman and a group of fifteen economists, doctors and other experts, including professors Barbara Baarsma, Ira Helsloot and Coen Teulings, who published a public appeal on 4 December 2020 to achieve better coronavirus policy. The core of the call was a request to the government to have the proposal, a risk-based policy with targeted protection, evaluated by RIVM. Herstel-NL considered the hard lockdown as disproportionate, pointing out that the lockdown itself also caused health damage, not just economic damage. In January it was decided to set up a public campaign after the request to evaluate the plan was rejected. On February 18, 2021, a nationwide campaign was launched with radio spots, billboards and posters, financed by crowdfunding. The slogan was "Er is een plan waarmee Nederland open kan" ("There is a plan with which the Netherlands can open up"). The proposal was supported by the Artsen Covid Collectief ("Doctors' Covid Collective"), a group that claims to represent approximately 1500 doctors.

== Criticism ==
Teulings explained the proposal in the television program Op1, but especially the idea of establishing "safe zones" for vulnerable people did not appeal to everyone. Criticism came from several sides:

- Fellow professor Arnoud Boot accused Teulings of having neglected his role as an independent scientist.
- In the press conference of February 23, 2021, outgoing minister Hugo de Jonge called the plan unworkable and "life-threatening".

A few days after the plans were presented, Teulings announced that he was no longer active for Herstel-NL. Baarsma also quickly withdrew after the criticism. According to the board of Herstel-NL, Teulings and Baarsma resigned due to political pressure, but they themselves deny this.

According to Fransman, it was a misunderstanding that Herstel-NL wanted to "put the elderly in reservations" or "open everything up", and the intention was precisely to find a better balance between the interests of people with vulnerable health on the one hand, and people who were harmed by the lockdown, such as students, shopkeepers and people who work in the catering industry. To make this clearer, another public campaign was launched on 8 March 2021 with new newspaper advertisements and TV spots.

== The fate of the founder ==
On 3 December 2021 Herstel-NL's founder Robin Fransman announced via his Twitter account that he had tested positive for COVID-19. His comment was "Corona positief, Het werd ook een keer tijd" ("Corona positive, It was about time too"). Shortly afterwards, he was admitted to the OLVG hospital in Amsterdam, where he died as a result of the infection on Tuesday, December 28, 2021. Fransman himself did not want to be vaccinated and publicly expressed himself in a very critical way about the effect and desirability of vaccines.
