= Municipal Health Service =

Regional healthcare organization in the Netherlands

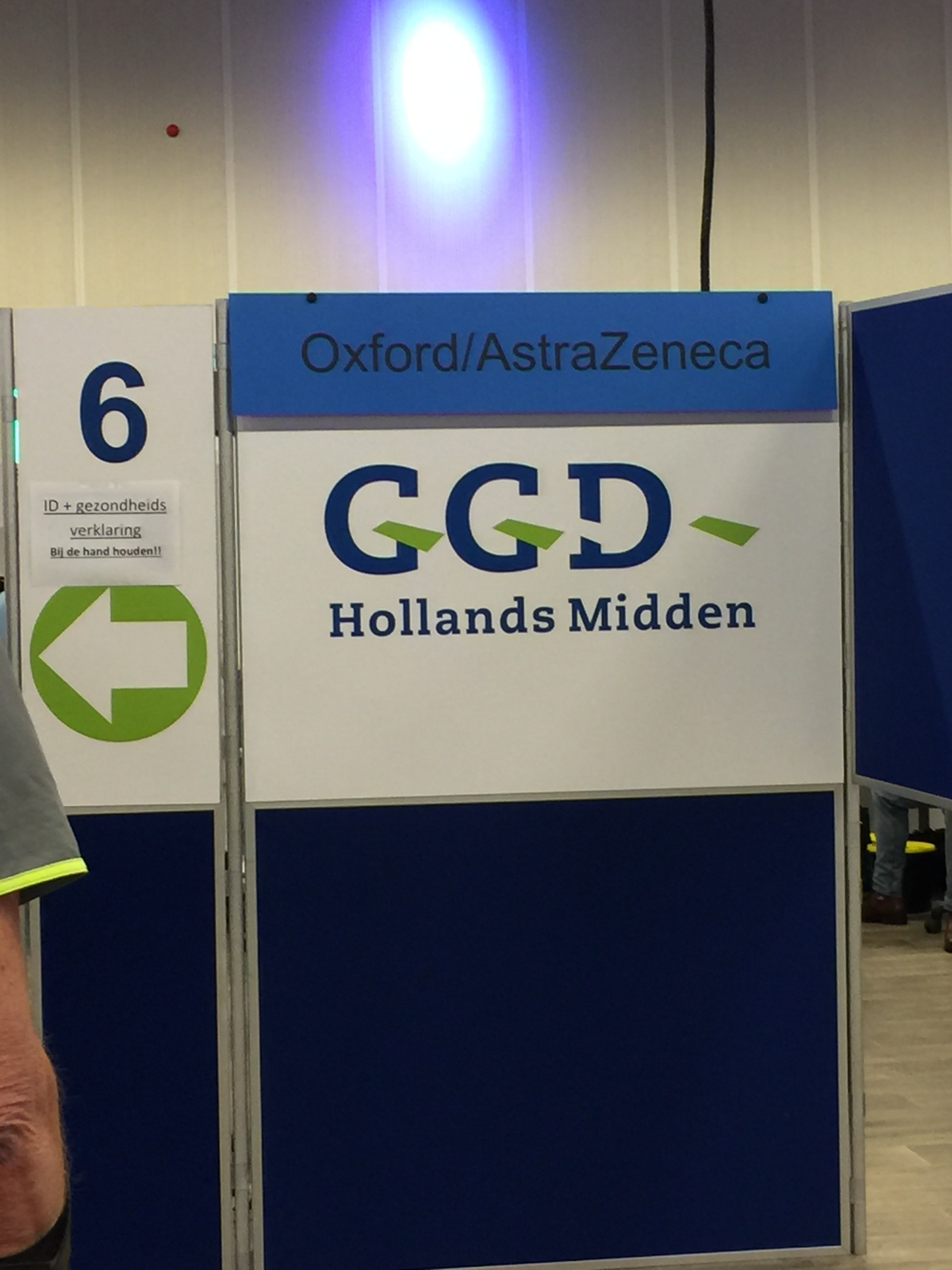
Logo of GGD Hollands Midden

In the European Netherlands, a Municipal Health Service (Dutch: Gemeentelijke Gezondheidsdienst, GGD) is a decentralised public health organisation. Legally, the responsibility for the provision of this service lies with the municipalities. However, in practice, the municipalities work together to provide this service at a regional level, resulting in twenty-five "GGD regions". The borders of the GGD regions largely correspond to the borders of the safety regions.

GGD GHOR Nederland is the national umbrella organisation of the twenty-five Municipal Health Services and Regional Medical Assistance Organisations (GHOR).

== Tasks ==
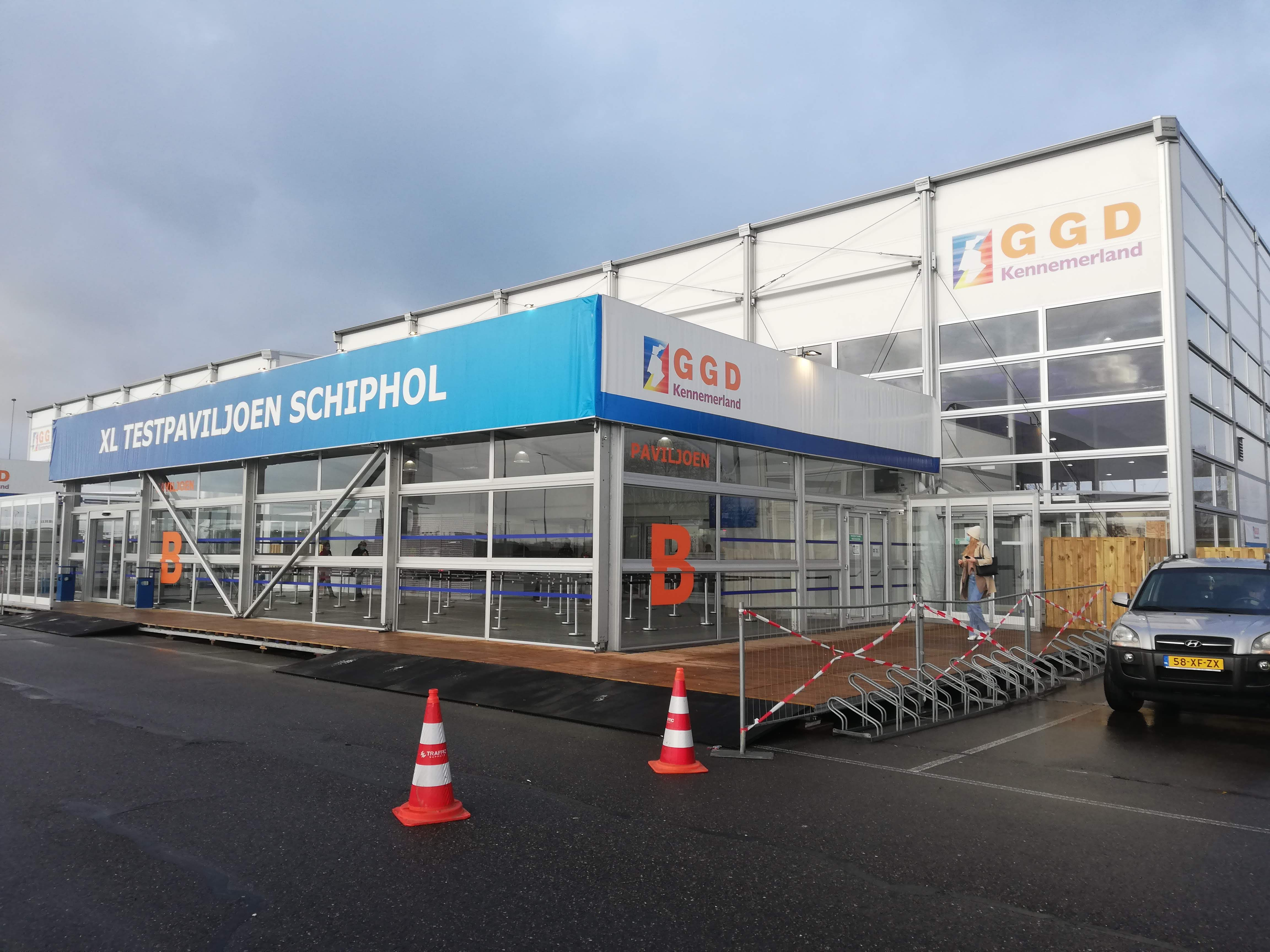
COVID-19 testing site of GGD Kennemerland at Schiphol Airport

Common tasks of the Municipal Health Services include:

- Children's preventive healthcare
- Infectious disease control
- Health promotion
- Environmental medicine
- Medical screening
- Travel medicine
- STD testing

=== COVID-19 pandemic ===
During the COVID-19 pandemic in the Netherlands, the Municipal Health Services have been tasked with setting up large testing and vaccination sites across the country. They also bear the responsibility for carrying out contact tracing.

== GGD regions ==
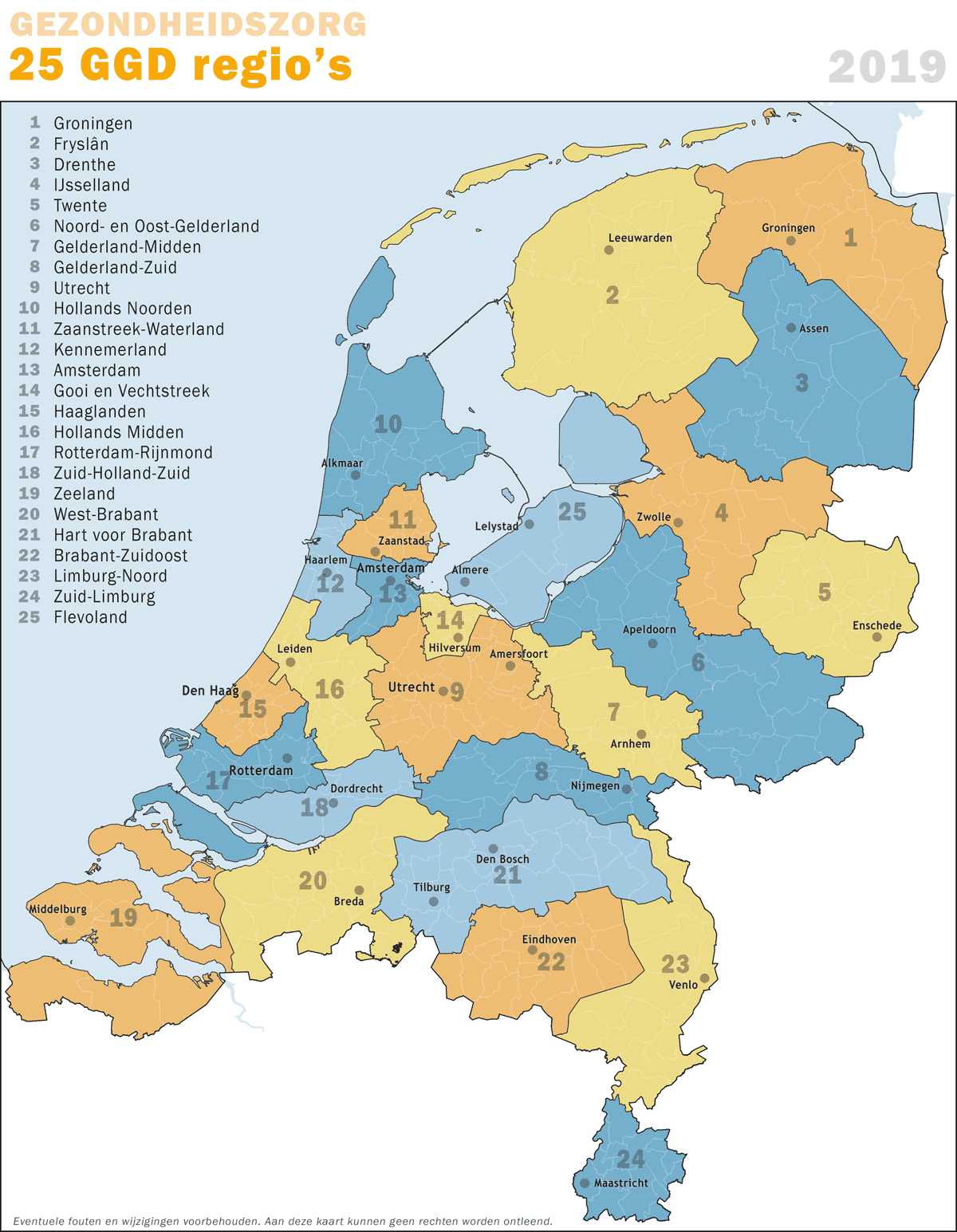
Map of the GGD regions

No.	Municipal Health Service	Province	Head office(s)
1	GGD Groningen	Groningen	Groningen
2	GGD Fryslân	Friesland	Leeuwarden
3	GGD Drenthe	Drenthe	Assen
4	GGD IJsselland	Overijssel	Zwolle
5	GGD Twente	Overijssel	Enschede
6	GGD Noord- en Oost-Gelderland	Gelderland	Warnsveld
7	GGD Gelderland-Midden	Gelderland	Arnhem
8	GGD Gelderland-Zuid	Gelderland	Nijmegen & Tiel
9	GGD regio Utrecht	Utrecht	Zeist
10	GGD Hollands Noorden	North Holland	Alkmaar
11	GGD Zaanstreek-Waterland	North Holland	Zaandam
12	GGD Kennemerland	North Holland	Haarlem
13	GGD Amsterdam	North Holland	Amsterdam
14	GGD Gooi en Vechtstreek	North Holland	Bussum
15	GGD Haaglanden	South Holland	The Hague
16	GGD Hollands Midden	South Holland	Leiden & Gouda
17	GGD Rotterdam-Rijnmond	South Holland	Rotterdam
18	GGD Zuid-Holland-Zuid	South Holland	Dordrecht
19	GGD Zeeland	Zeeland	Goes
20	GGD West-Brabant	North Brabant	Breda
21	GGD Hart voor Brabant	North Brabant	's-Hertogenbosch & Tilburg
22	GGD Brabant-Zuidoost	North Brabant	Eindhoven
23	GGD Limburg-Noord	Limburg	Venlo
24	GGD Zuid-Limburg	Limburg	Heerlen
25	GGD Flevoland	Flevoland	Lelystad

== See also ==
- National Institute for Public Health and the Environment (RIVM)
- Dutch Association of Mental Health and Addiction Care (GGZ)
