= Jaap van Dissel =

Dutch virologist

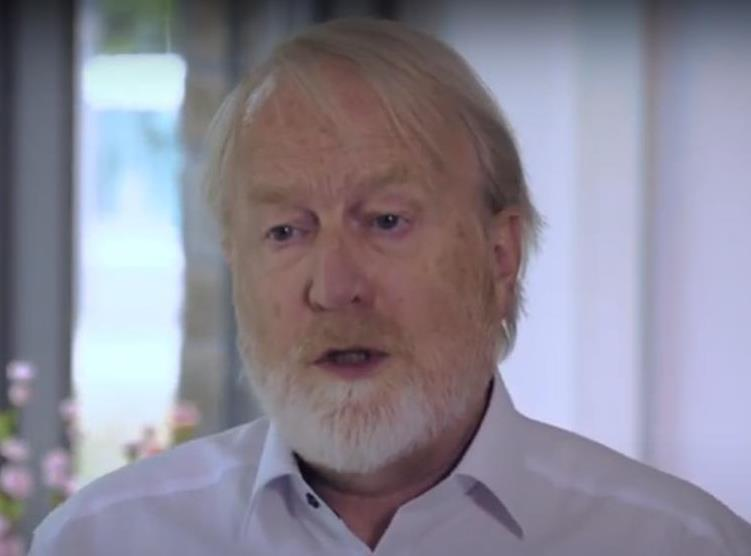
- Born: 29 April 1957 (age 69); Amsterdam, Netherlands
- Known for: chairman of the Outbreak Management Team

Academic background
- Education: Leiden University
- Thesis: Divergent bactericidal activity of resident and activated macrophages for Salmonella typhimurium and Listeria monocytogenes

Academic work
- Discipline: virology internal medicine
- Sub-discipline: infectiology
- Institutions: Leiden University Medical Center; Leiden University; National Institute for Public Health and the Environment

Jaap Tamino van Dissel (born 29 April 1957) is a Dutch virologist and infectiologist.

Van Dissel is director of the Centrum Infectieziektebestrijding (CIb) of the Netherlands National Institute for Public Health and the Environment (RIVM). He is also professor at the Leiden University with specialization Internal Medicine, in particular infectious diseases.

== Life ==
Van Dissel was born on 29 April 1957 in Amsterdam. He obtained his doctorate at Leiden University in 1987 with a thesis titled: "Divergent bactericidal activity of resident and activated macrophages for Salmonella typhimurium and Listeria monocytogenes". He became a professor of internal medicine, in particular infectious diseases, at Leiden University in 2000. In 2013 he succeeded Roel Coutinho as head of the Centrum Infectieziektebestrijding.

== COVID-19 pandemic ==
In 2020, Van Dissel became well known as chairman of the Outbreak Management Team (OMT), a nonpartisan committee which is responsible for advising the Third Rutte cabinet regarding suitable measures for the COVID-19 pandemic in the Netherlands. He has received criticism from colleagues and international equivalents, as done by his American equivalent Anthony Fauci after Van Dissel advised against usage of cloth face masks. At that time van Dissel feared that his fellow citizens could assume wearing cloth face masks as the only and seemingly sufficient measure and ignore all the other hygiene measures.

On 6 May 2021 it was announced that van Dissel would receive the Academy Medal of the Royal Netherlands Academy of Arts and Sciences on 31 May 2021 for his work as scientific advisor during the COVID-19 pandemic.
