= Hans Cohen =

Dutch microbiologist (1923–2020)

Hans Herman Cohen (3 February 1923 – 14 May 2020) was a Dutch microbiologist. He was director-general of the Netherlands National Institute for Public Health and the Environment (RIVM) between 1984 and 1986. As a microbiologist Cohen worked on development of polio vaccines in the Netherlands.

== Early life and education ==
Cohen was born in Groningen on 3 February 1923. He was born to a non-religious Jewish father and Protestant mother. His father assumed his mother's faith. His uncle on father's side was David Cohen. During his childhood Cohen wished to become a pediatrician. After attending the gymnasium he enrolled at the University of Groningen to study medicine. Due to his Jewish sounding surname he was expelled in 1941. Cohen, being only half Jewish, evaded further measures and worked as a medical analyst for the next several years. Directly after the end of World War II he resumed his studies, obtaining his title of doctorandus in 1950. In 1953 he obtained his PhD.

== Career ==
Cohen started working for the Rijksinstituut voor Volksgezondheid, a predecessor of the RIVM in 1953. His initial wish was to start working on a polio vaccine but he was rebuffed as there was not yet a government vaccination order. However, during the 1950s and 1960s he worked on the development of the Salk polio vaccine. In the 1970s Cohen together with Jonas Salk and Charles Mérieux founded the Forum for the Advancement of Immunization Research (FAIR). He was pivotal in the introduction of the DPT vaccine in the Netherlands. At the onset of the discovery of HIV/AIDS Cohen noticed abnormalities in the blood values and stopped the import of blood to the Netherlands.

During his time as director-general of the Rijksinstituut voor Volksgezondheid he oversaw the merger with two other institutes per 1984, which resulted in the formation of the RIVM. Per 1 January 1984 he was appointed director-general of the RIVM. His term ended in 1986. The Dutch Council of Ministers subsequently nominated him as head of the Commission for environmental effects rapport. He held this position for ten years.

In 1992, after a minor polio outbreak in the Netherlands, he protested against the offer of a free polio vaccine to around nine million persons not in risk groups, calling it a "waste of money".

Cohen was elected a member of the Royal Netherlands Academy of Arts and Sciences in 1980. In 1986 he was named Commander in the Order of Orange-Nassau.

== Death ==
Cohen died from the consequences of COVID-19 in Bosch en Duin on 14 May 2020, during the COVID-19 pandemic in the Netherlands aged 97. He had suffered from dementia for the last three years of his life.
