= Irma Sluis =

Dutch sign language interpreter

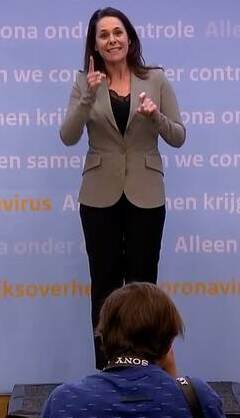
- Born: 1971 (age 54–55); The Hague, Netherlands
- Education: Heriot-Watt University
- Occupation: sign language interpreter
- Years active: 2001-current
- Employer: NOS
- Television: Morning news NOS; Rutte III cabinet press conferences during the COVID-19 pandemic in the Netherlands

Irma Sluis (born in 1971 in The Hague) is a Dutch sign language interpreter. She is an interpreter in Dutch sign language (NGT) and international sign language (Gestuno) and has published about working as a sign language interpreter in the Netherlands. Since 2005 she has been working with the Dutch broadcasting organisation NOS where she interprets the morning news.

Sluis was the first sign interpreter to be seen at press conferences of the Dutch government in March 2020. At the time, she was the one who was used as a sign language interpreter of all the press conferences of the Rutte III cabinet about the measures to combat the spread of the COVID-19 virus during the COVID-19 pandemic in the Netherlands. The repeated occurrence of a sign language interpreter during these press conferences led to more attention and understanding for the rights and interests of the deaf people community in the Netherlands.

== Biography ==
=== Education and career ===
Sluis was born in 1971 in The Hague. None of her direct family members are deaf, and therefore Dutch sign language is not her native language. She studied to become a sign language interpreter at the Instituut voor Gebaren, Taal & Dovenstudies in Utrecht, an institute for higher vocational education that was founded in 1997, the same year when Sluis started her studies. In 2001, Sluis was one of the first students at the institute to graduate with a Bachelor of Arts. In 2011, she graduated from Heriot-Watt University in Edinburgh with a Master of Arts in Sign Language Interpreting. She is able to interpret between Dutch, English, Dutch sign language, and International Sign (Gestuno). Sluis has experience working as an interpreter in the Netherlands and international settings at conferences, academic and higher education, linguistics, and (live) television broadcasts.

In 2001, Sluis started working as a professional interpreter, and from 2005 onwards she has worked for the NOS, the main Dutch public television broadcaster. For years, she interpreted the morning news broadcasts of the NOS Journaal on the NPO 2 channel. On 3 October 2016, the Dutch Labour Party and the Christian Union party proposed legislation to recognize Dutch sign language as an official language; Carla Dik-Faber, Member of Parliament in the Dutch House of Representatives, was interviewed on the radio show De Ochtend regarding this law proposal, while Sluis acted as interpreter—a first for the show. In 2019, Sluis appeared in the educational children's television series Het Klokhuis, in an episode called "Gebaren" ("Signs"). In the episode, she acted in a Wild West-themed sketch, in which she interpreted the last words of a cowboy about to be hanged.

=== Coronavirus pandemic ===
On 12 March 2020, Sluis appeared as interpreter at a government press conference on the COVID-19 pandemic in the Netherlands, which was broadcast live on Dutch national television, and watched by millions. This was the first time the Dutch government ever used a sign language interpreter at a press conference. In March 2020, there were approximately 1.5 million deaf and hearing impaired people in the Netherlands. This community had already been lobbying for some time for the use of an interpreter at press conferences in times of crisis, primarily because important information during the Utrecht tram shooting in 2019 was not or poorly accessible to the deaf and hearing impaired. Only a few days earlier, on 10 March 2020, deaf activist Machiel Ouwerkerk expressed his discontent at the lack of interpreters by holding up a protest sign behind NOS Journaal reporter Joris van Poppel during a live broadcast, which read (in Dutch) "Where is the sign language reporter during crisis situations?". This protest action was received positively by many, and the next day an interview with Ouwerkerk was published in the newspaper Algemeen Dagblad in which he again explained the necessity of having an interpreter in live television broadcasts during crisis situations. The Dutch public broadcasting organization NPO responded, saying that they were working on a solution. The following day, 12 March, NOS used Sluis as interpreter for the first time, interpreting that day's press conference. That same day, NOS announced that for the time being—at the very least for the duration of the coronavirus pandemic—they would also use an interpreter during the evening news broadcasts of the NOS Journaal. The frequent appearances of Sluis as sign language interpreter during these press conferences directly led to more awareness among the general Dutch public for the issues that the deaf and hearing impaired community in the Netherlands deals with.

The fact that Sluis was chosen as interpreter for this press conference, which was organized on very short notice, was pure coincidence: a resident of The Hague, out of all available interpreters she lived closest to the location of the press conference. Sluis said that, before the press conference started, she had to look up a couple of signs for words that are rarely used, but which suddenly became important during the coronavirus pandemic, including the sign for panic buying. Newspaper Het Parool asked her the following day what it was like, to "write history", to which she responded: "well, what's most important is that the deaf community has equal access to information. Me standing there, is not as relevant. It could have also been a colleague of mine [standing there, instead of me]. I am mostly just happy that we accomplished getting an sign language interpreter up there [on stage]."

At the press conference on 15 March 2020, Sluis interpreted the Dutch word for panic buying, "hamsteren" (which has its etymological origins in the hoarding behavior associated with hamsters), for the first time when Minister for Medical Care Bruno Bruins said: "Again, I urge everyone to stop panic buying; it's not necessary, there's enough for everybody, but it's in fact the panic buying itself which is causing problems for supermarkets". The sign used by Sluis to interpret the word "hamsteren", reminiscent of the movements of the actual animal, was the cause of much hilarity, and the video clip of the event quickly became very popular on social media in the Netherlands. Later, NOS dedicated a separate news item to the meme.

On 19 May 2020, she was replaced by another interpreter at a press conference for the first time. Sluis only interpreted the initial briefing; she was replaced during the press question and answer session. NOS indicated that interpreting an entire meeting was sometimes too demanding for one person alone.

=== Reception ===
Soon after she started interpreting the coronavirus press briefings, Sluis started receiving an abundance of positive reactions from viewers and the press alike, primarily because of the sign she used for the word 'panic buying' ("hamsteren"). Non-deaf people found this particular sign hilarious due to its strong resemblance to the hoarding behavior of hamsters. Another sign she used, in which she seemed to be mimicking choking for air, as a translation for the phrase "if you can't stand staying at home", went viral on the Dutch side of the internet. In traditional media and on social media she was quickly nicknamed "(sign) interpreter laureate", "queen of the internet", and "beacon during the crisis". Sluis commented on her newfound fame: "it's overwhelming, but I am just doing my work". Her reaction to her sudden popularity was described as humble and unpretentious, because she views herself merely as someone who passes on someone else's messages. However, she also commented that she was really happy with the attention and recognition that the Dutch deaf and hearing impaired community and Dutch sign language received as a result of her appearances, and that she hoped that the decision to include a sign interpreter would promote the emancipation of this group. Colleagues in her field of work agreed with this statement. Her appearances earned her relative celebrity status within a span of a few weeks. According to newspaper Trouw, Sluis not only had an important role in making information more accessible, but she also kept up morale "in these difficult days".

== Trivia ==
- On 26 March 2020, Dutch comedian Kiki Schippers presented the song "Een Mooi Gebaar" (Dutch for "a nice gesture") during the talk show Ladies Night as a homage to Sluis, in which she interpreted Sluis' signs in novel, humorous ways while accompanied by footage from the actual press conferences.
- Sluis was not the only sign language interpreter who became temporarily famous during the coronavirus pandemic, and whose appearances led to more attention for sign languages and the rights and interests of the deaf and hearing impaired. Comparable situations happened in (among other countries) Canada and the United States, where—often for the first time—hearing citizens were exposed to sign language interpreters during official announcements, such as Brenda Jenkins (interpreter for prime minister of Canada Justin Trudeau), Christopher Desloges (Ontario), and Nigel Howard (British Columbia).

== Publications ==
- Sluis, Irma; De Wit, Maya (2013). Samenwerking, de sleutel tot succes! Kwaliteit van tolken gebarentaal: het perspectief van dove tolkgebruikers in Nederland (in Dutch). Nederlandse Beroepsvereniging Tolken Gebarentaal. ISBN 9789079568000. Archived from the original on 2017-05-22.
- De Wit, Maya; Sluis, Irma (December 2014). "Sign language interpreter quality: the perspective of deaf sign language users in the Netherlands". The Interpreters' Newsletter. 19: 63–85.
- De Wit, Maya; Sluis, Irma (2016). "International Sign: An Exploration into Interpreter Preparation". In Rosenstock, Rachel; Napier, Jemina (eds.). International Sign: Linguistic, Usage, and Status Issues. Washington D.C.: Gallaudet University Press. pp. 105–135. ISBN 9781563686566.
