= Henk Overgoor =

Dutch footballer (1944–2020)

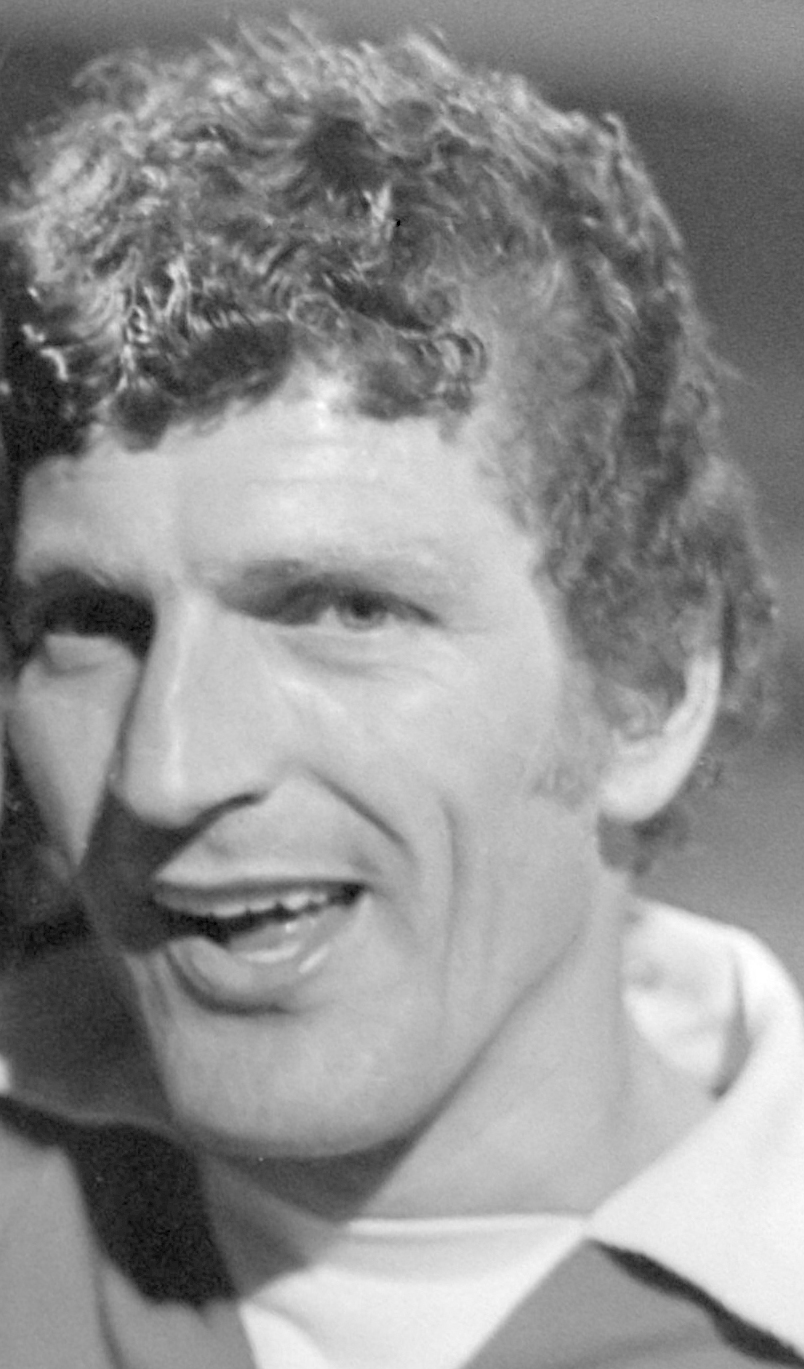
- Overgoor after a match in April 1976

Personal information
- Full name: Hendrikus Johannes Paulus Overgoor
- Date of birth: 30 April 1944
- Place of birth: Gendringen, Netherlands
- Date of death: 23 April 2020 (aged 75)
- Place of death: Amsterdam
- Position: Left back

Senior career*
Years	Team	Apps	(Gls)
1963–1965	Go Ahead Eagles		
1965–1979	De Graafschap		
- * Club domestic league appearances and goals

Hendrikus Johannes Paulus Overgoor (30 April 1944 – 23 April 2020) was a Dutch footballer who played as a left back.

He was born in Gendringen, Netherlands. He played for Go Ahead Eagles from 1963 to 1965 and for De Graafschap from 1965 to 1979.

== Club career ==
With De Graafschap he won the 1968–69 Tweede Divisie and spent 4 years in the Eredivisie. He played a total of 393 league and cup matches for the Superboeren, which put him fourth on the club's all-time appearances table.

He was nicknamed De Kapper (The Hairdresser) because he came from a hairdressing family. He scored in the heroic 5-7 defeat at Feyenoord in October 1973, in which he scored but also almost choked in his chewing gum only for Guus Hiddink to hit him in the back and regaining his breath.

== Personal life ==
Overgoor died in Amsterdam on 23 April 2020, at age 75, seven days short from his 76th birthday of complications from COVID-19 during the COVID-19 pandemic in the Netherlands.
