= COVID-19 pandemic in the Netherlands =

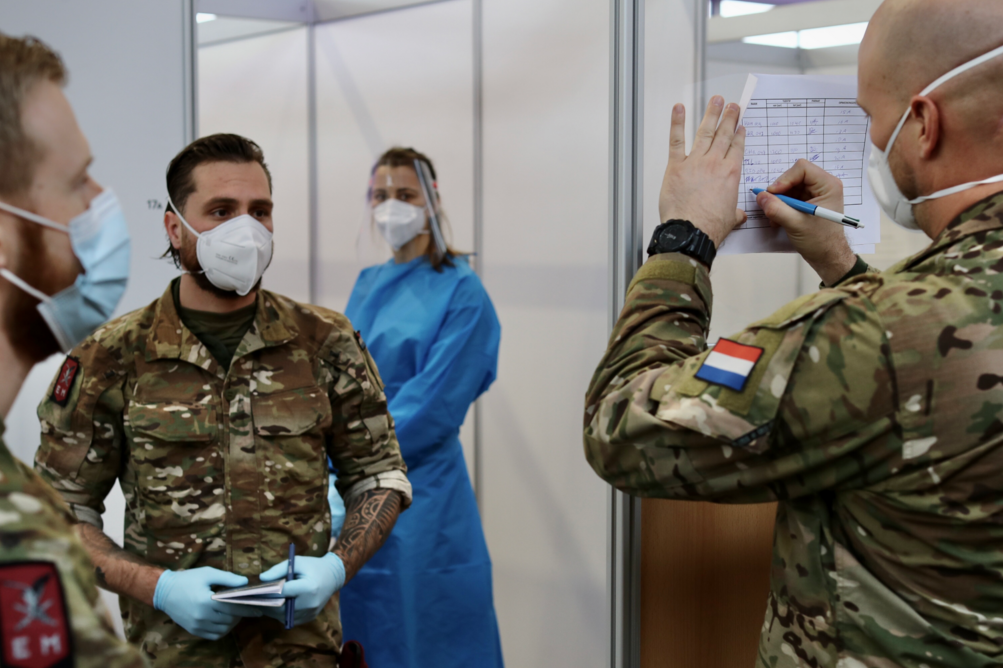
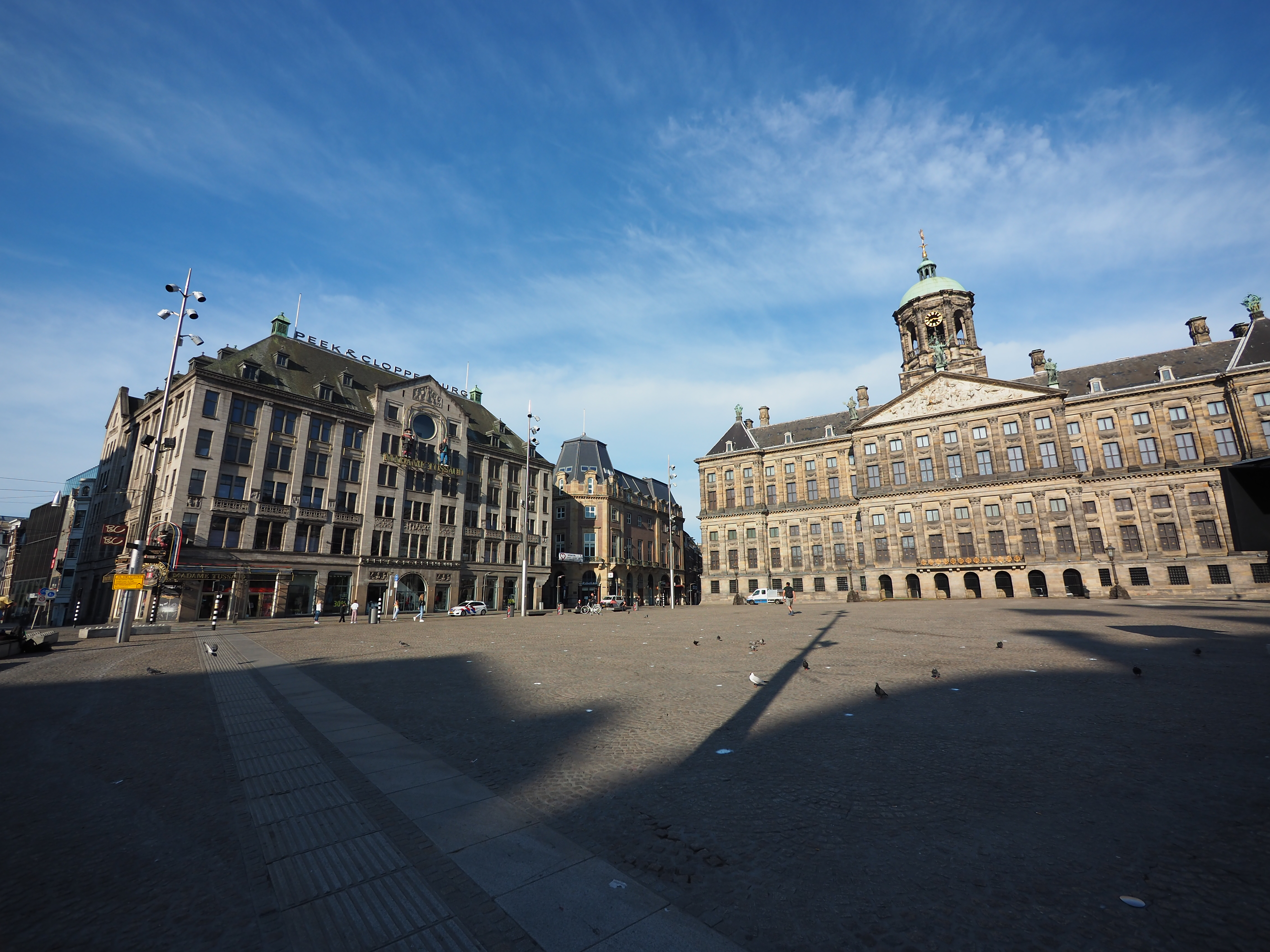
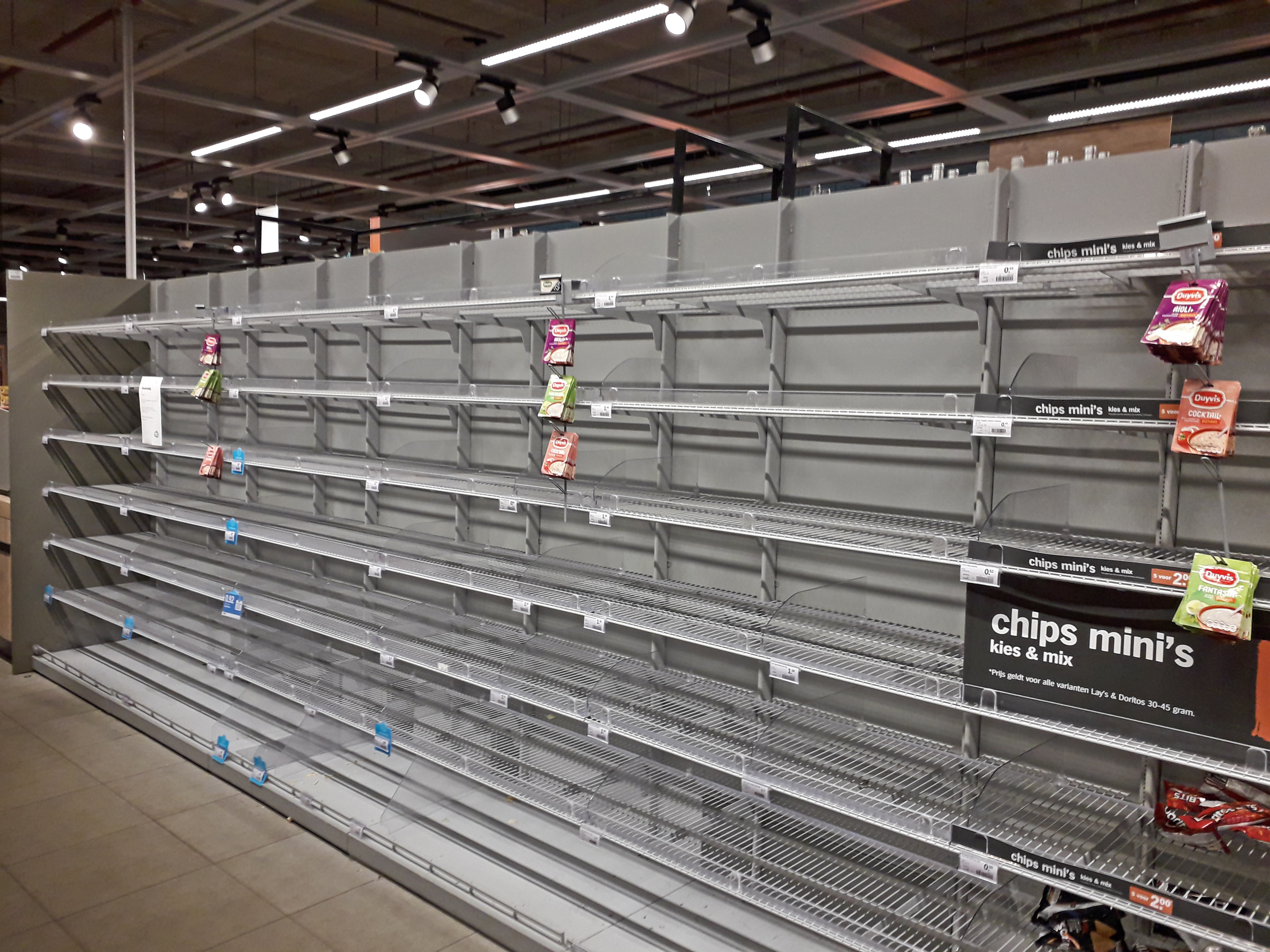
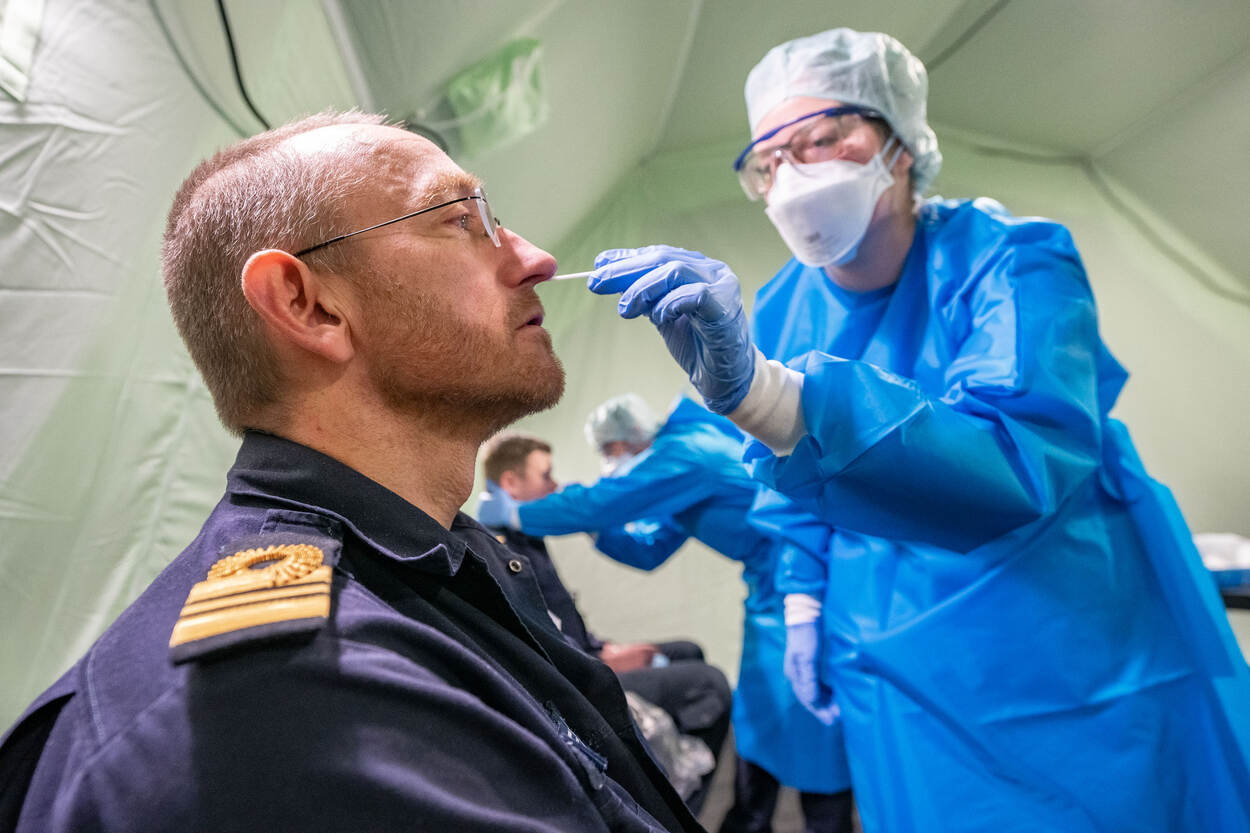
- Left to right, top to bottom: military personnel providing assistance at a COVID-19 testing site; an empty Dam Square in Amsterdam; empty shelves in a supermarket due to panic buying; a marine being tested for COVID-19
- Disease: COVID-19
- Pathogen: SARS-CoV-2
- Location: Netherlands
- Index case: Tilburg
- Arrival date: 27 February 2020 (6 years, 5 months, 4 weeks and 2 days)
- Confirmed cases: 8,657,553
- Recovered: no data (Note: The Netherlands National Institute for Public Health and the Environment (RIVM) does not count its number of recoveries.)
- Deaths: 22,986
- Fatality rate: 0.3%
- Vaccinations: 13,378,905 total vaccinated (13 March 2022); 4,029,669 fully vaccinated without booster (13 March 2022); 8,921,389 boosters administered (13 March 2022)

Government website
- www.rivm.nl

The COVID-19 pandemic in the Netherlands has resulted in 8,657,553 confirmed cases of COVID-19 and 22,986 deaths.

The virus reached the Netherlands on 27 February 2020, when its first COVID-19 case was confirmed in Tilburg. It involved a 56-year-old Dutchman who had arrived in the Netherlands from Italy. The virus was confirmed to have reached Europe on 24 January 2020, when the first COVID-19 case was identified in Bordeaux - France. As of 31 January 2021, there are 978,475 confirmed cases of infections and 13,998 confirmed deaths. The first death occurred on 6 March, when an 86-year-old patient died in Rotterdam.

On the advice of the Outbreak Management Team (OMT), under supervision of Jaap van Dissel, measures were taken by the Third Rutte cabinet for the public health to prevent the spread of this viral disease, including the "intelligent lockdown". The government strategy on pandemic control has been criticised for the refusal to acknowledge the role of asymptomatic spread and the role of masks in preventing spread, as well as for the lack of testing capacity, in particular during the first half of 2020. In March 2020, Prime Minister Mark Rutte called for herd immunity as an important method to stop the pandemic. On 23 January 2021, as the government imposed a nationwide 9:00 p.m. curfew in a context of emergence of the British variant, the worst riots in 40 years broke out across the country.

Since the end of November 2021, the SARS-CoV-2 Omicron variant is spreading in parts of Europe (i.e. UK, Denmark and France). The number of registered new infections has risen strongly. There was a lockdown in the Netherlands from 19 December 2021 to (at least) 14 January 2022.

As of 10 September 2022, a total of 36,105,753 vaccine doses have been administered.

== Background ==
On 12 January, the World Health Organization (WHO) confirmed that a novel coronavirus was the cause of a respiratory illness in a cluster of people in Wuhan, Hubei, China, who had initially come to the attention of the WHO on 31 December 2019.

Unlike SARS of 2003, the case fatality rate for COVID-19 has been much lower, but the transmission has been significantly greater, with a significant total death toll.

== Timeline ==
=== January 2020 ===
- As of 22 January 2020, the country's main international airport Schiphol was not taking extra measures against the spread of the virus, stating the lack of direct flights from or to Wuhan.
- On 29 January the RIVM stated that the virus did not appear highly contagious, thus spread of COVID-19 in the Netherlands was unlikely.

=== February 2020 ===
- 22 February – 1 March: spring holiday for Dutch south and middle regions, where a significant number of families went skiing to Trentino, a northern province of Italy.
- 26 February: the Dutch foreign ministry updated its travel advice for Italy, advising citizens not to travel to areas affected by the COVID-19 outbreak.
- 27 February: the first confirmed case of COVID-19, a man from Loon op Zand who had been in the Lombardy region of Italy was admitted to Elisabeth-TweeSteden Hospital in Tilburg.
- 28 February: a second case confirmed, a woman from Amsterdam who had visited the Lombardy region in Italy was in home isolation in Diemen. She is an employee of the Academic Medical Center in Amsterdam.
- 29 February: third and fourth cases confirmed, the husband and the youngest child of the second case. On the same day the wife and daughter of the first case were also confirmed to have the virus. Another case is a woman from Delft, who had recently been travelling to Italy and is isolated at home.

=== March 2020 ===
==== 1–10 March ====
- 1 March: three new cases were confirmed: a 49-year-old woman from Nieuwendijk who had been hospitalised at Erasmus MC in Rotterdam, a woman in Tilburg and a man in Dalen, Coevorden. The 49-year-old woman had been admitted to the Beatrix Hospital in Gorinchem on 21 February before being transferred to Rotterdam later. She arrived at the Beatrix Hospital with respiratory problems and stayed in intensive care for a week. A test for SARS-CoV-2 was not conducted since she had no connection to infected areas or people. Therefore, her infection went unnoticed for over a week. On 1 March it was announced that she had COVID-19 and that she had been relocated to Erasmus MC due to her deteriorating condition earlier. Since then the Beatrix Hospital went into lock-down out of precaution for a few days. Only personnel was allowed to enter and leave the building. The hospital fully reopened on 5 March, after all employees had tested negative.
- 4 March: all of Northern Italy had an "only necessary travel"-advice. Some tourists were still in Italy, including a group of 900 students, something which received a lot of media attention. In the Netherlands the total number of cases climbed to 38, which included one person passing through the Netherlands who was isolated in Hoofddorp. The next day this number more than doubled to 82. According to Bruno Bruins, Minister for Medical Care, this was due to a catch-up in conducted tests.
- 6 March: the National Institute for Public Health and the Environment (RIVM) announced the first death due to COVID-19, an 86-year-old patient. The RIVM stated that most COVID-19 patients were infected in northern Italy and advised inhabitants of the North Brabant province to reduce their social contacts if they showed symptoms.
- 9 March: the total number of cases was 321, of which more than one-third were found in North Brabant. Prime Minister Mark Rutte asked citizens to stop shaking hands and asked people in North Brabant to remote work if possible.
- 10 March: stricter measures were introduced in the province of North Brabant. Larger events were banned, including professional football, a number of dance festivals, carnival parades and concerts. A scholarship program was cancelled at the University of Eindhoven. In addition to this, Tilburg Mayor Theo Weterings called to limit social contacts for a week.

==== 11–20 March ====
- 12 March: the government announced new measures that will be in effect through the end of the month. All events (concerts, sports) and all meetings with more than 100 people are now forbidden and the RIVM is encouraging people to remote work. The restriction also applies to museums. All Dutch universities will suspend physical teaching until 1 April, but online teaching will continue. Schools remain open.

This press conference was the first time the government used a sign language interpreter to ensure good communication to deaf people. Irma Sluis filled this position and quickly gained some fame with her performance.

- 13 March, the government cancelled all flights from China, Iran, Italy, and South Korea, the countries with the highest number of coronavirus cases, for two weeks. Flights leaving the destinations before 18:00 on that day could still land in the Netherlands.
- 15 March: the total number of cases was 1,135. The Municipal Health Service (Gemeentelijke gezondheidsdienst, GGD) estimated that as of this day, 6,000 people in the Netherlands had been infected, as since 12 March people with mild complaints had not been tested any more. Public measures were also tightened up. Schools and childcare centres will remain closed until 6 April, as well as cafés, restaurants, sports clubs, saunas, sex clubs and coffeeshops.
- 16 March: in the evening Prime Minister Mark Rutte addressed the nation about the coronavirus. It was the first time a Prime Minister had addressed the nation since the 1973 oil crisis. In his speech he announced that the government chooses not to resort to population confinement measures, but to rely on the measures taken earlier to try to assert maximum control over the spread of the virus. Reasoning that the virus is here to stay, the preferred approach would be to tackle the epidemic by building population immunity.
- 17 March: the total number of confirmed cases was 1,705, of which 314 patients had been admitted to the hospital. Arie Slob notified that schools could stay open for the sole purpose of letting final exam candidates finish their last schoolwork. Schools will only open if certain conditions are met. This measure is taken to ensure that final exam candidates are prepared for the national exam at the start of May.
- 18 March: the Minister for Medical Care, Bruno Bruins, became unwell during a parliamentary debate and collapsed. On 19 March he resigned from his position. In a press conference it was announced that Health Minister Hugo de Jonge would from then on handle the coronavirus pandemic in the Netherlands.
- 19 March: a traveller from the Netherlands was described as "Patient Zero of the Winelands" in South Africa.
- 20 March: in a press conference it was announced that Martin van Rijn would become the new Minister for Medical Care. In the evening, King Willem-Alexander addressed the nation due to the coronavirus outbreak.

==== 21–31 March ====
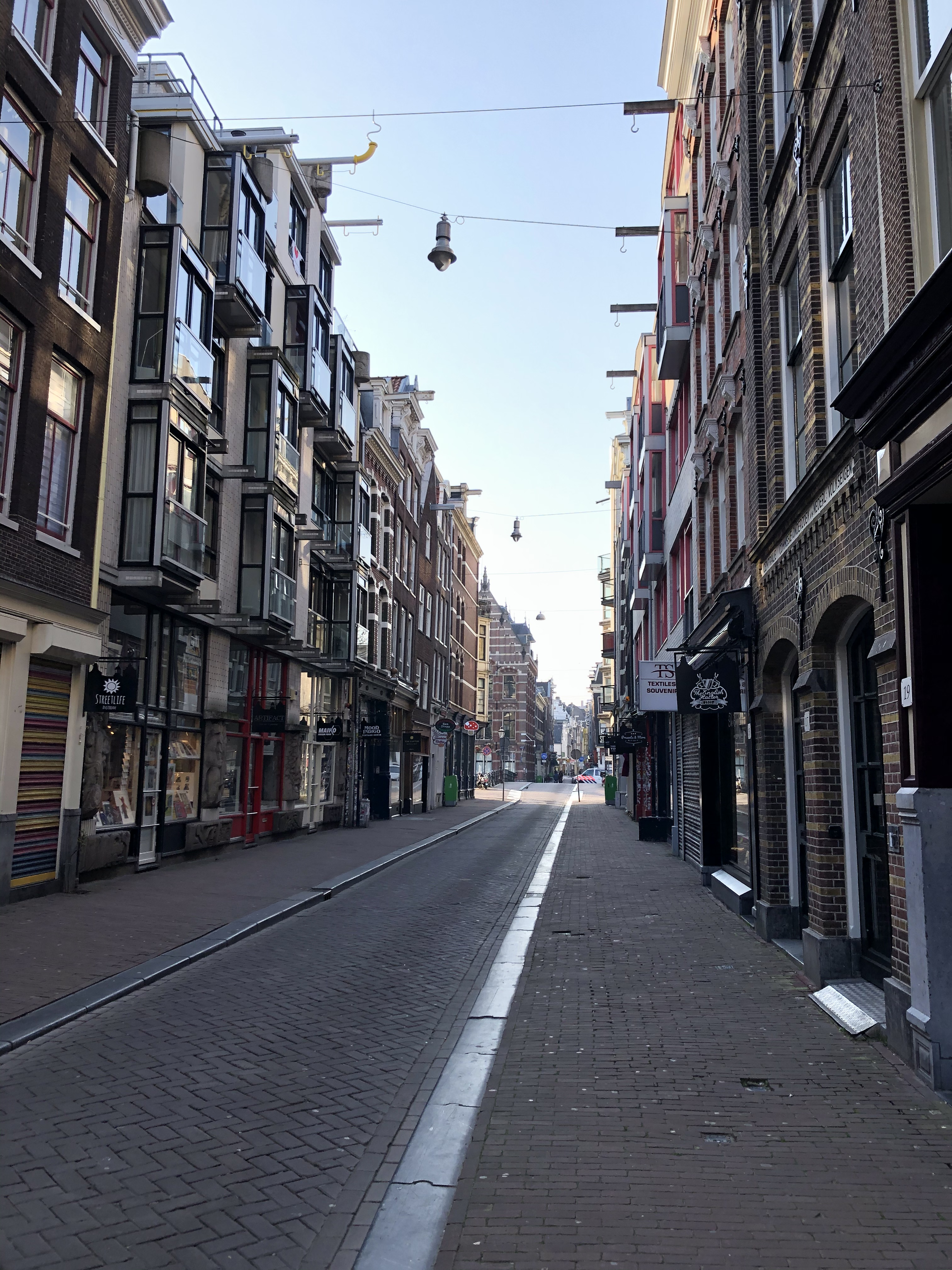
Empty city centre of Amsterdam on 27 March

- 22 March: the NOC*NSF (Dutch Olympic Committee*Dutch Sports Federation) sent a letter to the IOC stating the advice that the 2020 Summer Olympics only can take place when the coronavirus crisis is under control worldwide. The NOC also asked for more certainty for the athletes. The letter was supported by most of the National Sport Federations.
- 23 March: stricter social distancing rules were announced in a press conference.
- 24 March: in a press conference, the Minister for Primary and Secondary Education announced all final examinations (centraal eindexamen) for secondary education would be cancelled.
- 26 March: the NOC*NSF (Dutch Olympic Committee*Dutch Sports Federation) provided hundreds of cooling vests for healthcare personnel at the intensive care departments in several hospitals. Doctors have to work in warm conditions among others due to the protective clothing they have to wear. The vests would initially be used by the Dutch athletes at the 2020 Summer Olympics.
- 29 March: the total number of positive coronavirus cases in the country surpassed 10,000. Upon the announcement, RIVM stated that 'the number of hospitalised patients and the number of deaths are increasing less quickly than would have been expected without measures'. It further said that since testing was done mostly only for the very sick and healthcare workers, the actual number of infections is likely to be far higher.
- 31 March: in a press conference it was announced that all measures initiated on 15 March will be extended until 28 April.

=== April 2020 ===
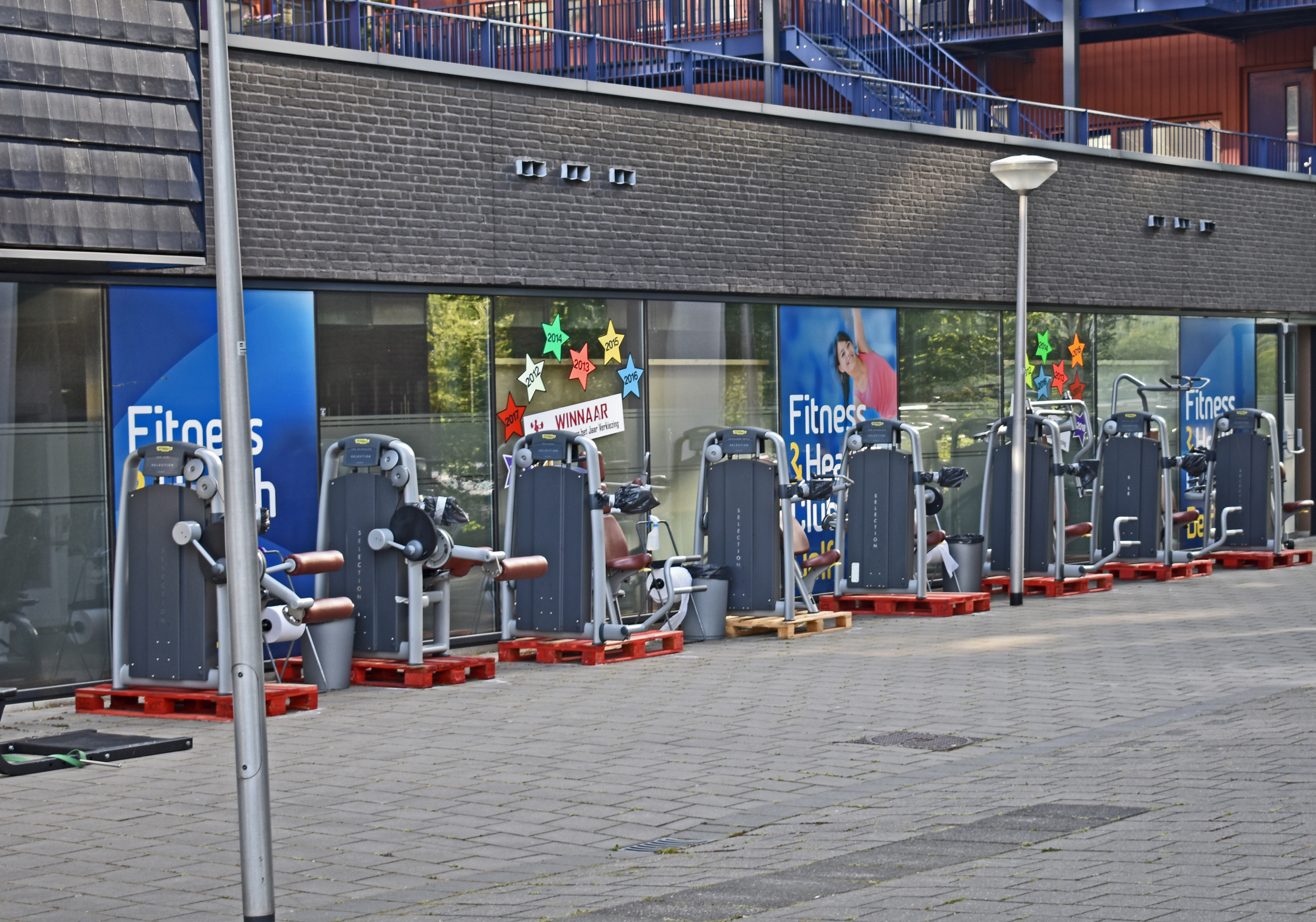
Exercise machines have been taken outside of a gym in Delft and placed on safe distance apart so that people could exercise while the gym itself is closed

- 7 April: Prime Minister Mark Rutte announced in a press conference that the measures could possibly be loosened a bit after 28 April, however getting back to 'normal' will take considerable time. Furthermore, the Dutch Government are researching possibilities to use an app to register corona infections and use this app to warn others who were in proximity of an infected person. However, concerns were raised whether this app would harm privacy.
- 8 April: this day marked the first day since the outbreak in the Netherlands that the number of corona patients in intensive care units declined. It was a sign to many that the curve was 'flattened' in the Netherlands.
- 15 April: Prime Minister Mark Rutte held a press conference. The numbers of infections, deaths and hospitalisations were declining. He announced that loosening the measures could only be done in small steps, and with several restrictions in mind: keeping 1.5 meter distance, sufficient health care capacity and adequate protection of older and/or weaker people.
- 20 April: a total number of 32,655 people tested positive for COVID-19 and 3,684 people died due to the coronavirus. Admittance to hospitals and ICUs was steadily declining, leading to conclusions that the lock-down measures had the desired effect.
- 21 April: All measures were extended until 20 May. An exception was made for elementary schools: these will open on 11 May. Mark Rutte also announced that secondary education would gradually open after 2 June. Furthermore, events that require a permit are forbidden until 1 September. Among others this means that football matches are also not allowed, resulting in the end of the 2019–20 Eredivisie season.
- 23 April: research of the RIVM indicated that the first infection in the Netherlands was possibly on 15 February, almost two weeks before the first confirmed infection. Among others this research was based on patients who had similar symptoms but were not tested for COVID-19.
- 26 April: COVID-19 was confirmed in mink at two fur farms in the Netherlands, the agriculture ministry confirmed.
- 28 April: after the Netherlands Trade and Investment Office was renamed "Netherlands Office Taipei" to reflect the increased scope of cooperation between the two countries, the Chinese ambassador expressed discontent, demanded a clarification of the name change, and reminded the Dutch government to dutifully adhere to the one-China principle. The Global Times warned of a backlash and claimed that users of Chinese social media sites had called for China to immediately stop exporting medical supplies to the Netherlands and that Chinese citizens were demanding a boycott of Dutch products and cancelling their travel plans to the Netherlands.

=== May 2020 ===
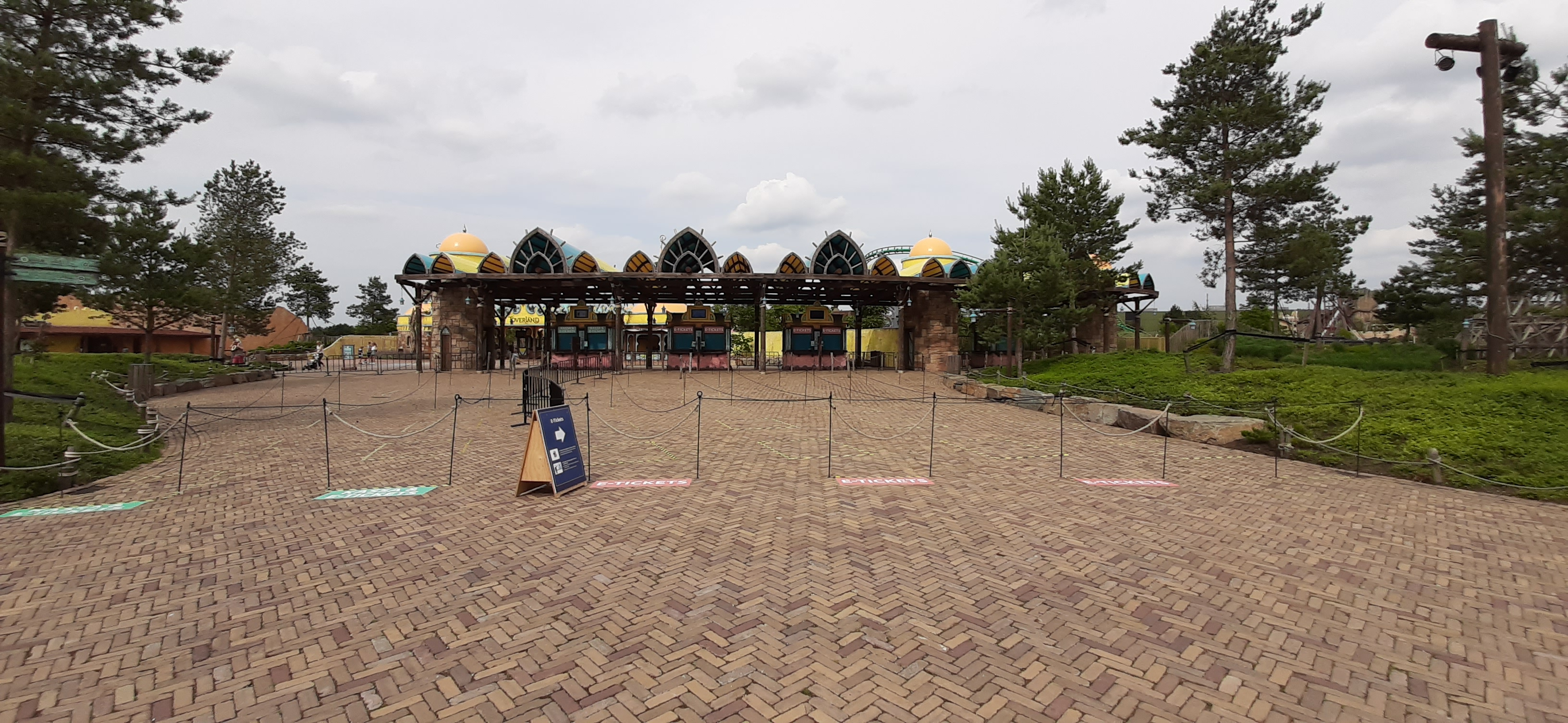
Waiting lines in theme park Toverland

- 6 May: the government announces that starting from 11 May so-called "contact jobs" such as hairdressers and beauty salons, can open again. From 1 June, bars can open their outside areas again. From that date the government also aims to test anyone with COVID-19 symptoms, instead of only health care workers. The advice "Stay home" changes to "Stay home when showing symptoms". Face masks become mandatory in public transport, despite the RIVM still doubting the effectivity.
- 7 May: Minister Hugo de Jonge indicates in a letter to the House of Representatives that large-scale events will not be possible until a vaccine is found.
- 11 May: indoor pools were also allowed to open again. Visitors were required to dress at home beforehand and shower at home afterward. All visitors older than 12 years old had to maintain a 1.5 meter distance.
- 19 May: in a press conference the government announced that more restrictions could be loosened, provided that no new outbreaks will occur. From 2 June secondary schools partly opened for students. From 8 June primary schools fully opened. And from 15 June onwards, middle level (mbo) and high educations (hbo/wo) partly opened.

=== June 2020 ===
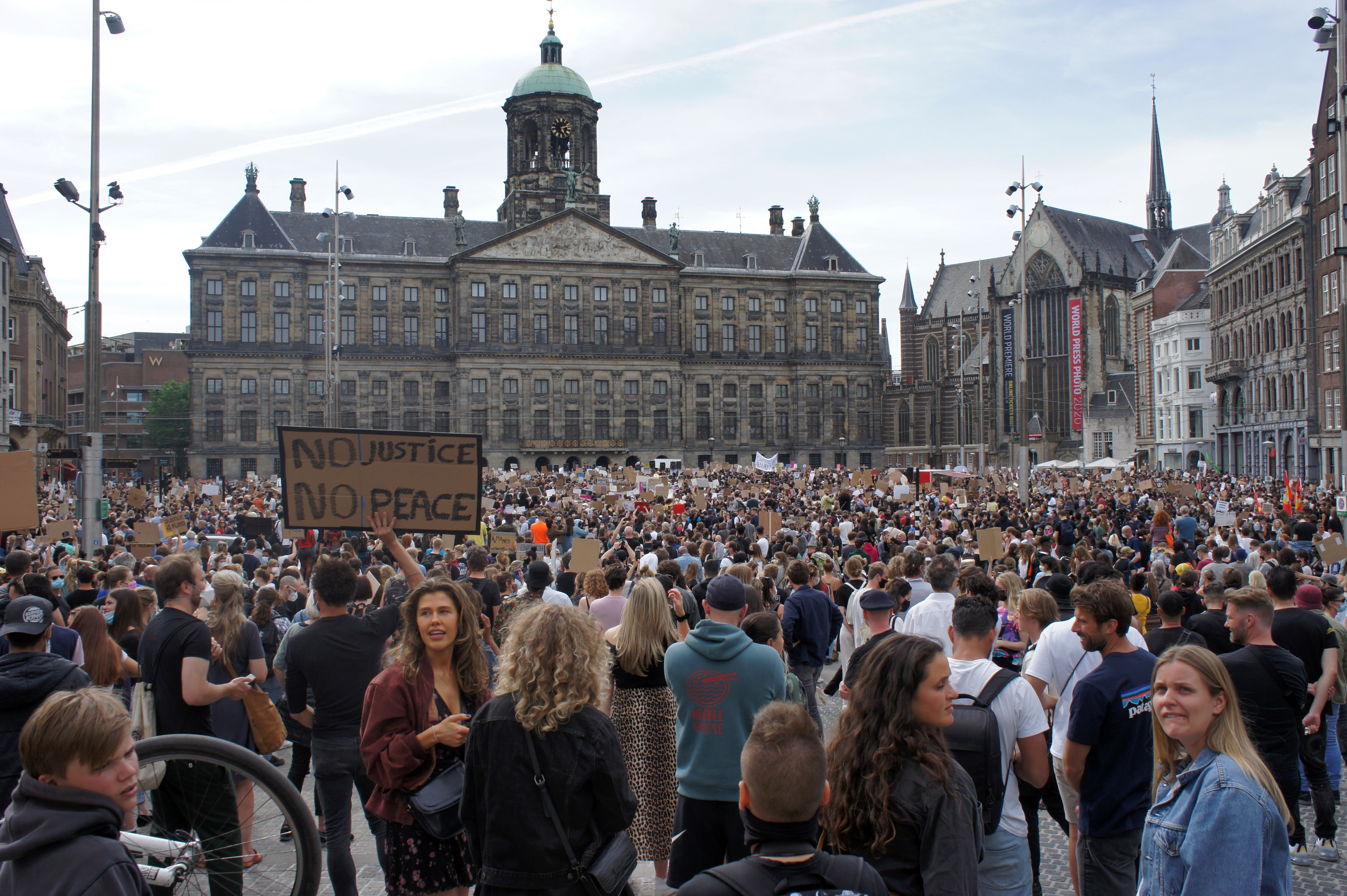
Thousands of protesters at Dam Square in Amsterdam on 1 June in response to the murder of George Floyd

- 1 June: bars and restaurants are allowed to open from 12:00. Inside a maximum of 30 guests are allowed who have to reserve beforehand. On outdoor terraces no maximum is enforced. Both in- and outside guests and personnel have to maintain 1.5 meter distance, unless they are from the same household. On this day there was also a large demonstration on Dam Square in Amsterdam. This was part of the George Floyd protests. About 5,000 people converged on the square. While most of them wore face masks, it was impossible to maintain 1.5-metre distance. The mayor of Amsterdam, Femke Halsema, opted to not stop the demonstration, as she feared riots. She faced harsh criticism afterwards, as this demonstration could cause a new outbreak of COVID-19. However, almost no cases linked to the demonstration (or similar demonstrations in other cities) were found in the weeks after.

=== July 2020–present: second wave ===
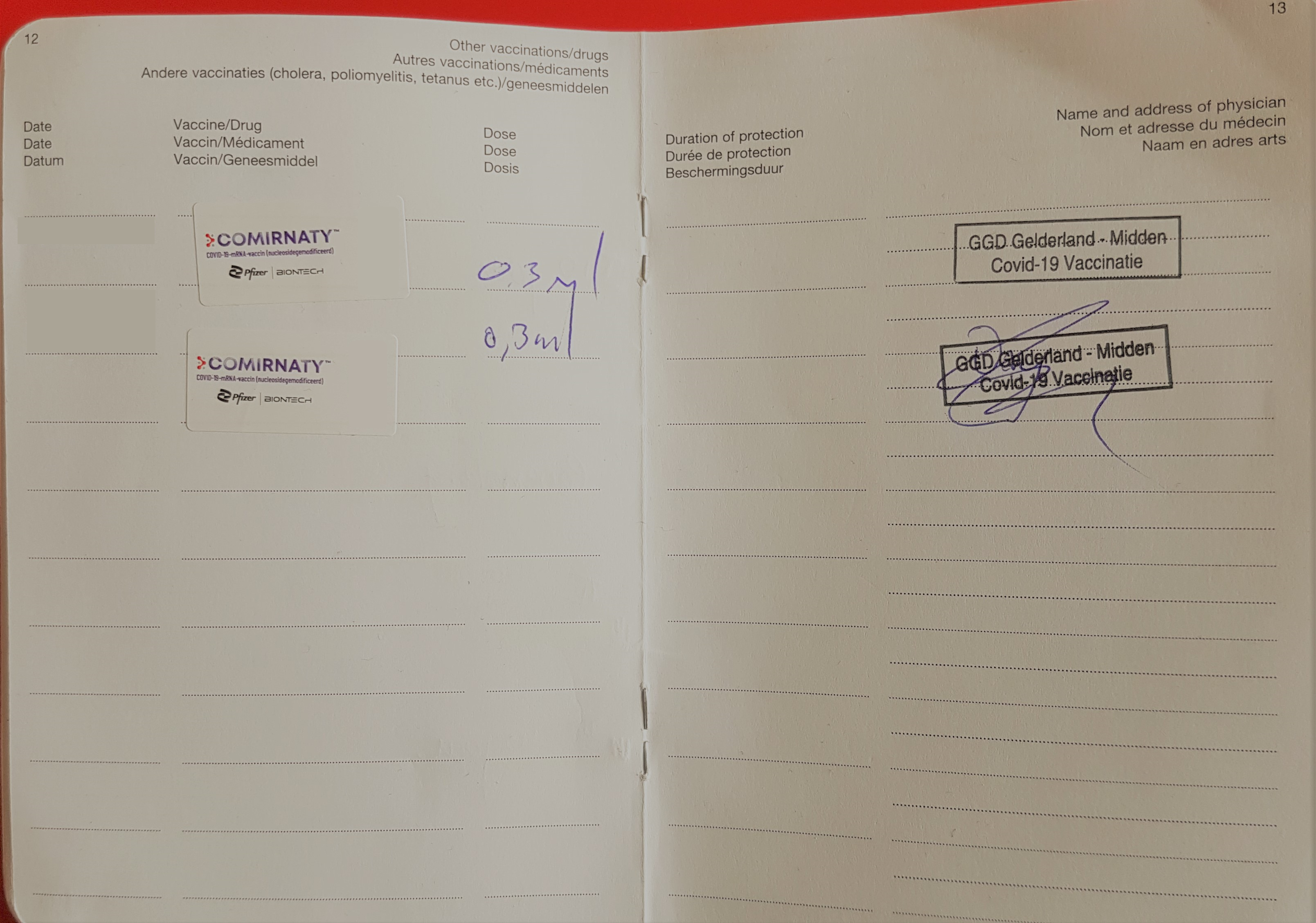
An ICVP issued in the Netherlands, recording proof of vaccination against COVID-19 with the Pfizer–BioNTech vaccine

Since mid-July, there has been a large increase in positive cases, from about 50 positive tested people/day to over 7,000 positive tested people per day. Measures were tightened in late September to achieve control over the spread again. About 1 in 120 people were deemed infectious in late September. A record number of 11,107 new cases in one day was reported on 30 October.

From 14 October 22:00, a partial lockdown came into effect. Cafes, restaurants, and bars were to be closed for at least two weeks. Starting 1 December, masks were made compulsory to wear while indoors.

From 15 December 2020 through at least 15 March 2021, a hard lockdown is in effect, and all non-essential shops are closed.

On 19 December 2020, it was discovered that a mutant strain of COVID-19, Variant of Concern 202012/01, had entered the Netherlands. The Dutch government banned flights from the United Kingdom, where the strain was originally identified, in response. The travel ban is scheduled to remain in place until at least 1 January.

Shortly after Christmas 2020, most European countries started COVID-19 vaccination programs, however the Netherlands expected to start vaccination on 8 January 2021. The government cited issues with the digital registration system as the cause of the delayed vaccination start.

As of 9 January 2021, a total of 30,000 healthcare workers had been vaccinated, and 96 cases of the Lineage B.1.1.7 variant have been reported. As of 16 January 2021, 200 cases of that variant have been reported. These cases cause extra concern, as this variant is suspected to be more contagious, with a reproduction number estimated to 1.3.

As of 26 January 2021, over 173,000 people had gotten vaccinated.

In January 2021, it was discovered that personal data of people in the contact tracing database was illegally sold to fraudsters by call center employees having access to them. A few days earlier, employees of testing company U-diagnostics were found to have shared personal data in a WhatsApp group of 300 employees, violating the GDPR privacy regulations.

=== January 2021 curfew and protests ===
Starting on 23 January 2021, the Dutch government introduced a curfew as means to curb the epidemic. On 24 January 2021, violent protests erupted as a reaction. The curfew, imposed between 9 pm to 4:30 am, was the first of its kind to be enacted in the country since the Second World War. Protests took place in most major cities, including Amsterdam and Eindhoven. Police made hundreds of arrests and issued thousands of fines. The Dutch Police Association described the riots at the worst violence in Netherlands in the last 40 years. The protests have been described as being composed of mostly young men.

An opinion poll by public broadcaster NOS indicated that the curfew was supported by seven out of 10 Dutch respondents, with just 18% of the population opposing it. A lawsuit started by Willem Engel's Viruswaanzin (later renamed Viruswaarheid) challenged the legal justification for the curfew, and while a lower court found that the government's justification was lacking, the matter was quickly remedied.

Exceptions to the curfew have been made for several groups of people, including medical emergencies, essential jobs, including delivery, and walking dogs on a leash.

=== June 2021 ===
On June 5, an openingsplan cancelled many COVID restrictions. Three weeks later, the number of new infections rose massively.

=== July 2021 ===
On July 10, 2021, the government reintroduced a series of restrictive measures due to a rapid increase in infections. All restaurants and bars must be closed from midnight until 06.00. The measures will remain in place until 14 August 2021.

=== November 2021 protests and riots ===
In November 2021, the government proposed implementing the "2G rule", a measure to only allow individuals who are vaccinated (gevaccineerd) or have recovered from a COVID-19 infection (genezen) from being able to enter hotels, restaurants, cafes, cultural and artistic places, and events, and to use non-essential services. On November 19, a protest against the 2G rule was announced on social media, which turned into a riot. The police shot several people.

Most notably, riots occurred in Rotterdam, where 51 people were arrested. There were also riots in Stein, Roermond, Urk, The Hague, Enschede, Leeuwarden and Tilburg. The authorities used water cannons, police dogs and mounted police against the rioters. Three rioters were seriously injured when police opened fire on them, while a fourth sustained minor injuries. Additionally, four rioters and five police officers sustained minor injuries during the unrest. Peaceful protests also took place in Amsterdam and Breda.

=== December 2021 ===
On 19 December, a lockdown began. It lasted until 14 January 2022. Only essential facilities, such as food stores and pharmacies, stayed open, and only during reduced hours. Schools and educational facilities were closed; in particular, the school Christmas holidays started one week earlier. Public transport continued to operate, although schedules were adjusted.

=== January 2022 ===
On January 3, 2022, following winter break, the government opened primary and secondary schools again. Tertiary schools — middle and higher education — remained closed.

=== Spring 2022 ===
The face mask requirement on public transport was removed on 23 March 2022. The move was further relaxed in airports and on planes on 21 May 2022.

== Prevention measures and response ==
Temporary sign mandating physical distance by the entrance of Westerpark, Amsterdam

In late March, the government announced strict social distancing rules as cases surged over 5,000. All large public events and gatherings are banned until 1 September. Furthermore, in public space a distance of at least 1.5 metres between people not from the same household must be observed, and shops and other venues are to enforce this distancing among their visitors. Fines will be issued to those not complying with the new rules. Companies may face a fine up to €4,000, individuals risk a fine up to €400. Prime Minister Mark Rutte repeated his call to keep distance from each other. Final examinations of secondary school were cancelled on 24 March. Other measures were that schools and day-cares were closed, except for children whose parents work in the 'vital' sectors, like health care. People were required to remote work as much as possible. These measures also resulted in modified schedules for public transport, as much less transportation of individuals was necessary.

=== Reaction to second wave ===
As a response to the large increase in positive tests since July, the Dutch government released additional regulations on 13 October. These include:

- Closing the hospitality industry.
- Banning the sale of alcohol in the evening, as well as closing non-essential stores.
- Limiting group sizes and the number of guests received at home.
- Banning events and amateur sports for adults.
- Requiring face masks in public indoor spaces, including schools outside classrooms.

Additionally the government advised people to remote work and limit unnecessary travel.

==== Holiday season ====
The Dutch government also stated that people should be mindful of the regulations during the holiday season. Sint Maarten, a holiday where children collect sweets from neighbours, was still held with social distancing and maximum group size regulations in place. Sinterklaas was also held with the same regulations, with people also being advised not to delay holiday shopping to the last possible moment.

In November 2020, the government also announced that it would ban fireworks on New Year's Eve (traditionally the only time of the year that consumers are allowed to purchase and ignite fireworks), citing that firework-related injuries would put too much stress on the healthcare system during the pandemic.

==== Reaction to the B.1.1.7 variant ====
In January 2021, the government extended its regulations and considered tightening them to limit the spread of Lineage B.1.1.7, which is estimated to be more contagious.

=== Contact tracing application ===
The Dutch Ministry of Public Health officially maintains an application called CoronaMelder for Android and iOS. The applications, including the backend are open source software under the European Union Public License.

CoronaMelder launched nationwide on 10 October 2020, and was downloaded 2.6 million times two days later. The maintainers stated that they are unable to track the number of users that actively use the application owing to privacy reasons. Later that month on 26 October the app had reportedly 3.5 million downloads and around 14,000 reports of positive test results.

== Testing ==
By mid-March, the country could test about 1,000 samples per day, which is less than the capabilities of other European countries. This also explains a relatively large ratio of the number of deaths to the number of confirmed cases. As of 25 March, 2,500 samples have been tested daily and a total number of 38,000 tests performed. Because of the limited availability of testing capacity, certain groups were prioritised in testing, such as healthcare workers, elderly, and people with acute symptoms. A lack of testing capacity causes a distinct number of deaths by COVID-19 that are not registered as such, although local doctors can recognise the symptoms. By the end of March, the country was testing about 4,000 people per day, with the goal of expanding the testing capacity to about 17,500 daily tests in a couple of weeks. Once such a testing capacity has been reached the Dutch government wants to expand its testing capacity to 29,000 tests a day. According to a report by the RIVM, an average of 4,280 tests per day have been performed in the period between 9 March and 26 April. Several health organisations have started testing themselves, claiming the procedures of the GGD testing centers take too long.

In a press conference on 6 May, the government announced that starting from 1 June it wants to test all people with COVID-19 symptoms. The coordination has been criticised, with the regional GGD offices stating there is no clear national plan to scale up testing. Nonetheless, the test capacity was increased to 30,000 per day with the GGDs being able to conduct 600 to 2400 contact traces for positively tested applicants with 2-8% of the tests done assumed to result positive for the virus. On 1 June, a national telephone number was made public through which a test time and location could be scheduled. The new system, although initially overwhelmed by the number of callers on the first day, tested 50,000 people in the first week and had 100,000 applicants by 11 June. By 9 June, most regions where successful in handling the increased demand, with people often being able to schedule a test the same day or the day after. The GGDs strive for a test result to be made known to the applicant within 48 hours, with 96% of results being successfully returned within that time by 11 June.

== Impact ==
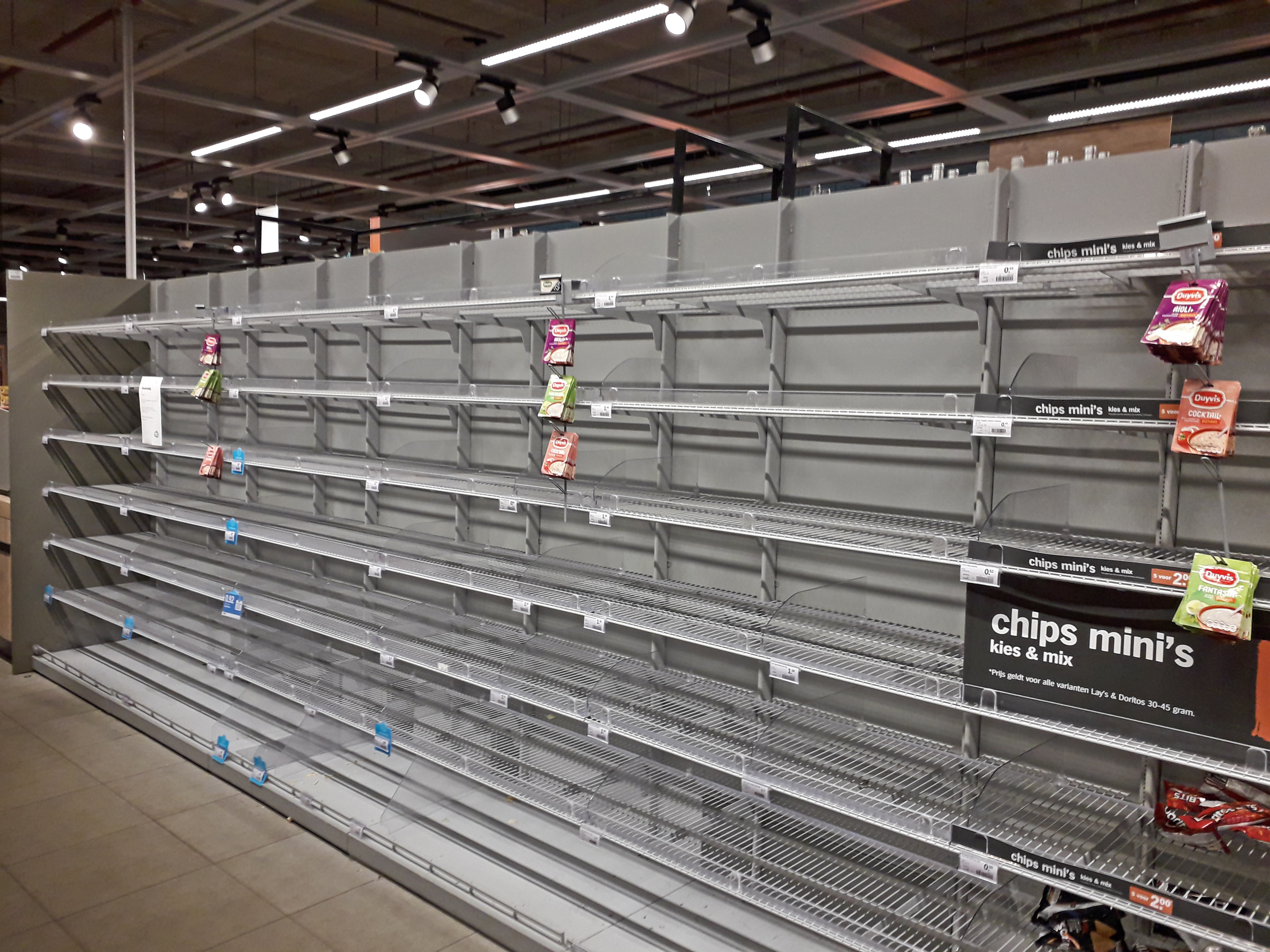
Empty shelves in a supermarket in Delft as a result of hoarding, 15 March

In response to regulations announced on 12 March, panic buying of food, toilet paper and medicines, resulted in empty shelves in supermarkets. Prime Minister Mark Rutte appealed to the nation to stop this behaviour. On 12 March it was announced that all public events with more than 100 people will be cancelled until 6 April. On 24 March this period was extended to 1 June for all permit-requiring events. Three days later it was announced in a press conference that all restaurants, museums, sport clubs and schools had to close. A Dutch "grassroots" initiative, Mond Kapjes Nodig was formed to address the local PPE shortages. More than 400,000 masks were delivered within weeks to those fighting the pandemic in the Netherlands. This helped relieve the coordination efforts on a national level.

=== Economic ===
On 26 March, the Bureau for Economic Policy Analysis published the first calculations of the economic expectations. These expectations are based on the length of the prevention measures against the coronavirus pandemic. If these measures are present for three months, the Dutch economy is expected to shrink by 1.2 per cent in 2020. If these measures are required for a year the economy would decline by 10 per cent. In all cases it is expected that the economy will slightly grow the following year.

On 8 June, three months into the crisis, an analysis of Rabobank was published. They expected that the economy between March and June shrunk by 8%, with the catering sector being hit the most. They expected that, whereas the crisis was over the peak, the economy would continue shrinking, and the industries, in particular the construction industry, which were doing relatively well, would be hit as well. The forecast was that the unemployment rate would grow from 3% to 7% by the end of 2020.

As a result of the ban on fireworks for the 2020-2021 New Year's Eve the Dutch government has compensated the fireworks industry for around 40 million euros.

== Statistics ==
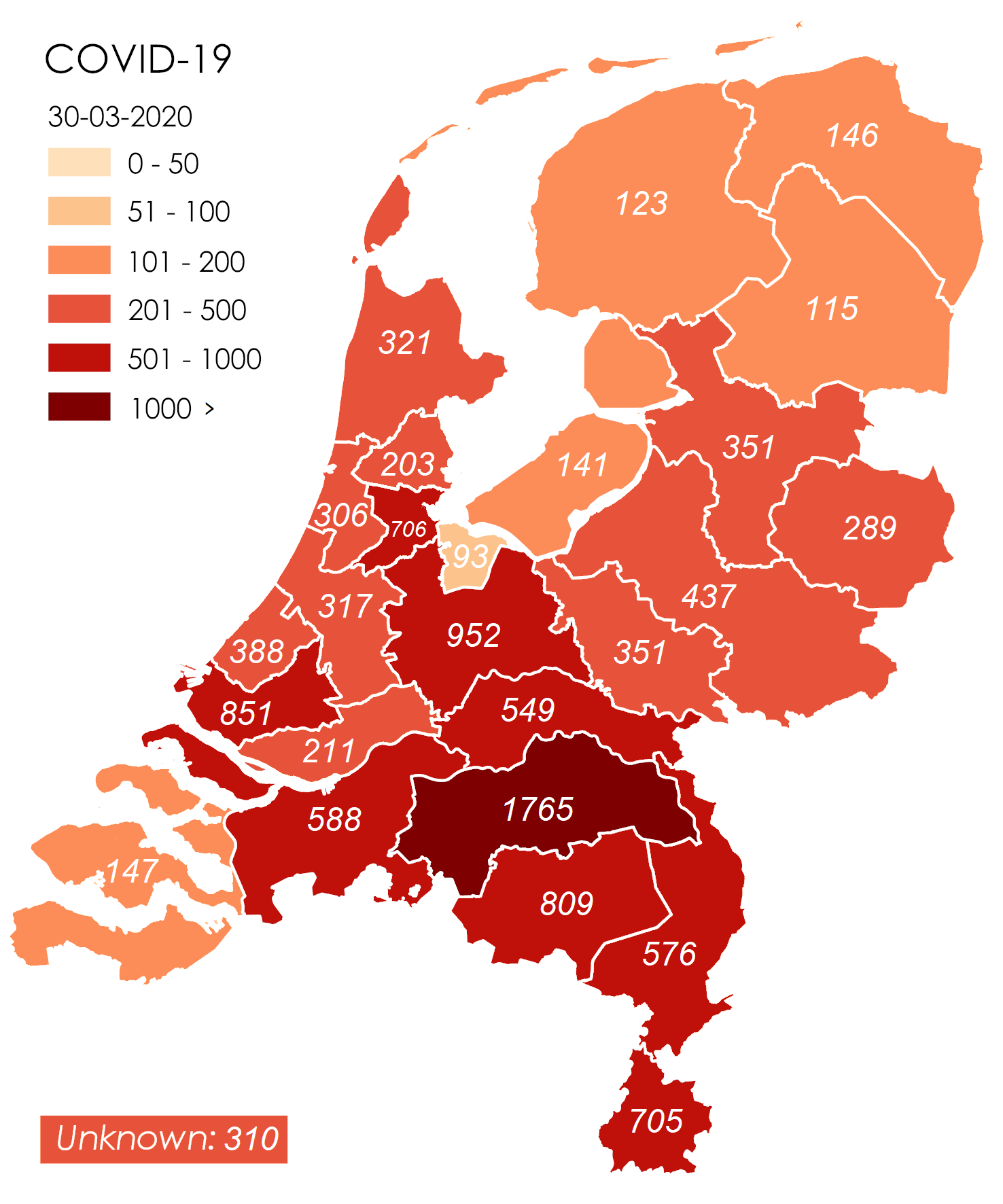
Municipal Health Service (GGD) regions by number of COVID-19 infections during the first wave (30 March 2020)

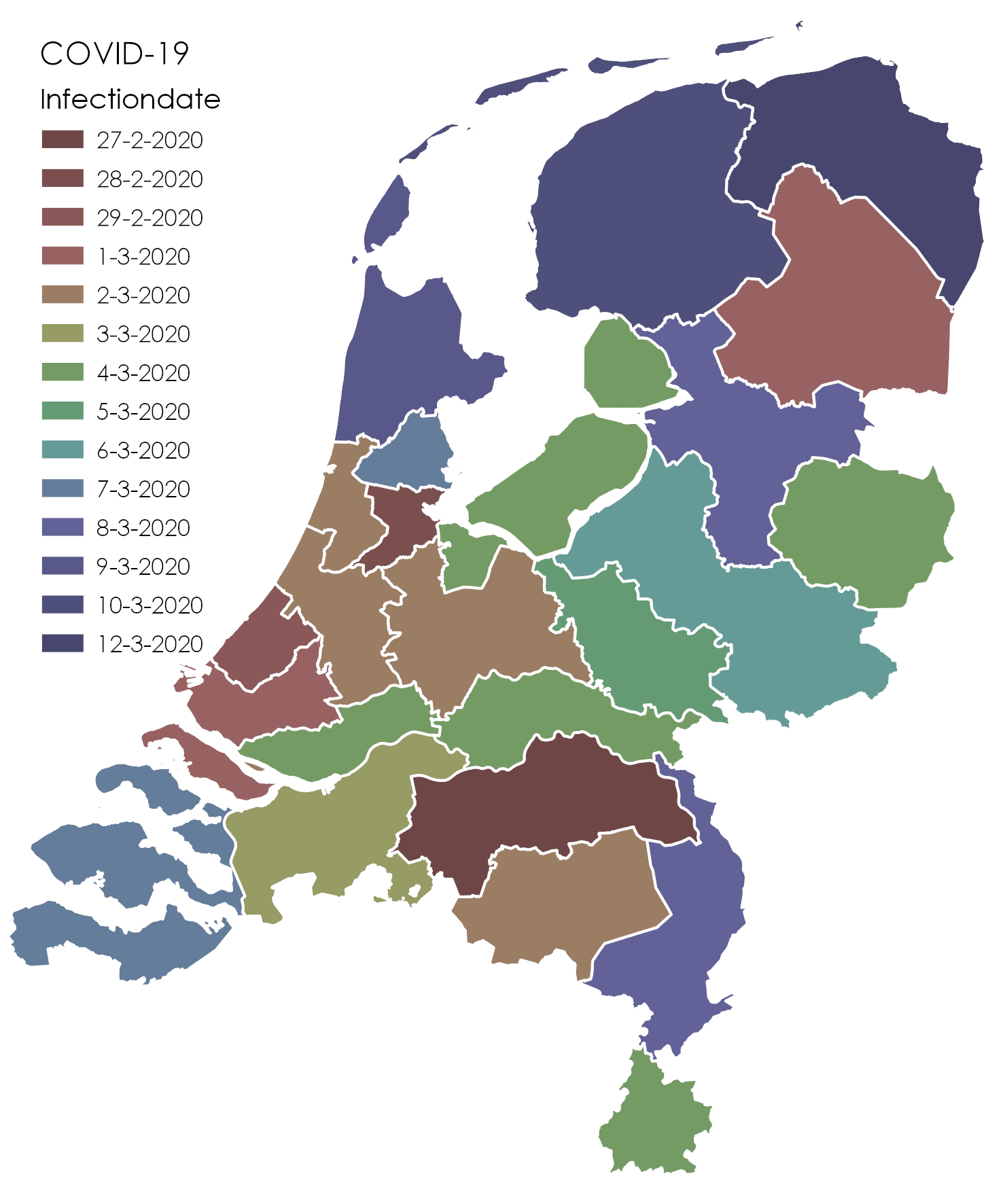
Municipal Health Service (GGD) regions by date of first COVID-19 infection

Number of cases (blue), number of deaths (red), and their respective increments (dotted lines) on a logarithmic scale

=== Total confirmed cases, hospitalisations and deaths ===
View source data.
View source data.
View source data.
Total confirmed cases, hospitalisations and deaths
Confirmed cases
Hospitalisations
Deaths

=== New confirmed cases per day ===
View source data.

=== New deaths per day ===
View source data.

=== New hospitalisations per day ===
View source data.

=== New IC admissions per day ===
View source data.

=== Growth rate of confirmed cases ===
Growth rate of confirmed cases
(a rising straight line indicates exponential growth, while a horizontal line indicates linear growth)

=== Confirmed COVID-19 cases by GGD district ===
Confirmed COVID-19 cases by GGD district
Province	Cases	GGD district	Cases
Drenthe	533	GGD Drenthe	533
Flevoland	984	GGD Flevoland	984
Friesland	631	GGD Fryslân	631
Gelderland	6,472	GGD Noord- en Oost-Gelderland	2,694
Gelderland	6,472	GGD Gelderland-Midden	1,647
Gelderland	6,472	GGD Gelderland-Zuid	2,131
Groningen	362	GGD Groningen	362
Limburg	4,863	GGD Limburg-Noord	1,780
Limburg	4,863	GGD Zuid-Limburg	3,083
North Brabant	9,593	GGD Brabant-Zuidoost	2,860
North Brabant	9,593	GGD Hart voor Brabant	4,722
North Brabant	9,593	GGD West-Brabant	2,011
North Holland	7,239	GGD Amsterdam	3,241
North Holland	7,239	GGD Gooi en Vechtstreek	642
North Holland	7,239	GGD Kennemerland	1,233
North Holland	7,239	GGD Hollands-Noorden	1,178
North Holland	7,239	GGD Zaanstreek-Waterland	945
Overijssel	3,098	GGD IJsselland	1,828
Overijssel	3,098	GGD Twente	1,270
South Holland	11,255	GGD Haaglanden	2,952
South Holland	11,255	GGD Hollands Midden	1,838
South Holland	11,255	GGD Rotterdam-Rijnmond	4,885
South Holland	11,255	GGD Zuid-Holland-Zuid	1,580
Utrecht	4,018	GGD Utrecht	4,018
Zeeland	732	GGD Zeeland	732
Unknown or non-resident	493		493
Total	50,273		50,273
Data as of 30 June 2020

=== Confirmed COVID-19 cases by sex and age ===
Confirmed COVID-19 cases by sex and age
Classification		Cases		Hospitalised		Deaths	
Classification		Number	(%)	Number	(%)	Number	(%)
All		50,273	100.0	11,877	100.0	6,113	100.0
Sex	Male	18,900	37.6	7,267	61.2	3,362	55.0
Sex	Female	31,282	62.2	4,602	38.7	2,751	45.0
Sex	Unspecified	91	0.2	8	0.1	0	0
Age	≥95	807	1.6	44	0.4	308	5.0
Age	90–94	2,452	4.9	253	2.1	833	13.6
Age	85–89	4,031	8.0	806	6.8	1,381	22.6
Age	80–84	3,916	7.8	1,243	10.5	1,268	20.7
Age	75–79	3,428	6.8	1,636	13.8	1,005	16.4
Age	70–74	2,999	6.0	1,704	14.3	629	10.3
Age	65–69	2,463	4.9	1,354	11.4	334	5.5
Age	60–64	3,869	7.7	1,304	11.0	164	2.7
Age	55–59	4,761	9.5	1,158	9.7	99	1.6
Age	50–54	4,403	8.8	864	7.3	47	0.8
Age	45–49	3,492	6.9	594	5.0	24	0.4
Age	40–44	2,489	5.0	288	2.4	6	0.1
Age	35–39	2,248	4.5	198	1.7	7	0.1
Age	30–34	2,600	5.2	159	1.3	4	0.1
Age	25–29	2,815	5.6	117	1.0	3	0
Age	20–24	2,323	4.6	64	0.5	0	0
Age	15–19	706	1.4	31	0.3	1	0
Age	10–14	216	0.4	8	0.1	0	0
Age	5–9	102	0.2	2	0	0	0
Age	0–4	149	0.3	50	0.4	0	0
Age	Unspecified	4	0	0	0	0	0
Data as of 30 June 2020

== Notable deaths ==
Name	Known for	Date (Aged)
Harry Aarts	Politician	25 March 2020 (aged 90)
Kim H. Veltman	Historian	1 April 2020 (aged 71)
Hans Prade	Surinamese diplomat and politician	3 April 2020 (aged 81)
Frits Flinkevleugel	Footballer	10 April 2020 (aged 80)
Ing Yoe Tan	Lawmaker	10 April 2020 (aged 71)
Bas Mulder	Dutch-Surinamese priest	10 April 2020 (aged 88)
Kishen Bholasing	Surinamese singer	12 April 2020 (aged 35)
Martine Crefcoeur	Actress	18 April 2020 (aged 84)
Ton van den Heuvel	Make-up artist	19 April 2020 (aged 94)
Koos van den Berg	Politician	21 April 2020 (aged 77)
Henk Overgoor	Footballer	23 April 2020 (aged 75)
Chavalit Soemprungsuk	Thai painter	27 April 2020 (aged 80)
Hans Cohen	Microbiologist	14 May 2020 (aged 97)
Bram van der Vlugt	Actor	19 December 2020 (aged 86)

== See also ==
- COVID-19 pandemic in Europe
- COVID-19 pandemic by country and territory
- List of countries by life expectancy
- Herstel-NL
