= National Institute for Public Health and the Environment =

Dutch research institute

- Rijksinstituut voor Volksgezondheid en Milieu
- Coat of arms of the Netherlands

Agency overview
- Jurisdiction: Kingdom of the Netherlands
- Headquarters: Antonie van Leeuwenhoeklaan 9, Bilthoven; 52.118524°N 5.189059°E
- Employees: 1700
- Minister responsible: Sophie Hermans, Minister of Health, Welfare and Sport
- Agency executive: Prof. dr. Isabel Arends, Director-general
- Parent department: Ministry of Health, Welfare and Sport
- Website: RIVM website

The National Institute for Public Health and the Environment (Dutch: Rijksinstituut voor Volksgezondheid en Milieu or simply RIVM) is a Dutch research institute that is an independent agency of the Ministry of Health, Welfare and Sport.

RIVM performs tasks to promote public health and a safe living environment by conducting research and collecting knowledge worldwide. The results are used to support the Government of the Netherlands in formulating its policy. RIVM's primary tasks are:

- research
- policy support
- national coordination
- intervention programmes
- provision of reliable information to the public and to professionals working in health care about infectious diseases, the environment, nutrition and safety.

RIVM is located in Bilthoven, Utrecht and employs over 1,500 people, many of whom work in multidisciplinary fields.

== History ==
RIVM was founded in 1910 when the Central Laboratory for Public Health was created.

The present size of the institute is the result of a merger between three government institutes in 1984.

RIVM has become a large, complex organisation with many different international links and a range of activities.

During the COVID-19 pandemic, the RIVM was tasked with oversight of the disease and how the Dutch government would combat it. They RIVM instituted weekly counts of infected people within the nation's borders. The director of the Infectious Disease Control bureau, Jaap van Dissel, was charged with disease reduction efforts.

By July 2021, the RIVM, which was a reference laboratory for the World Health Organization, recognized five types of COVID test technology:

- the PCR test
- the loop-mediated isothermal amplification (LAMP) test
- the antigen test
- the serological test
- the breathalyzer test

On 13 August 2021, government announced with RIVM approval that "From 30 August social distancing will no longer be required at secondary vocational schools (MBOs), higher professional education institutions (HBOs) and universities."

== Organisation ==
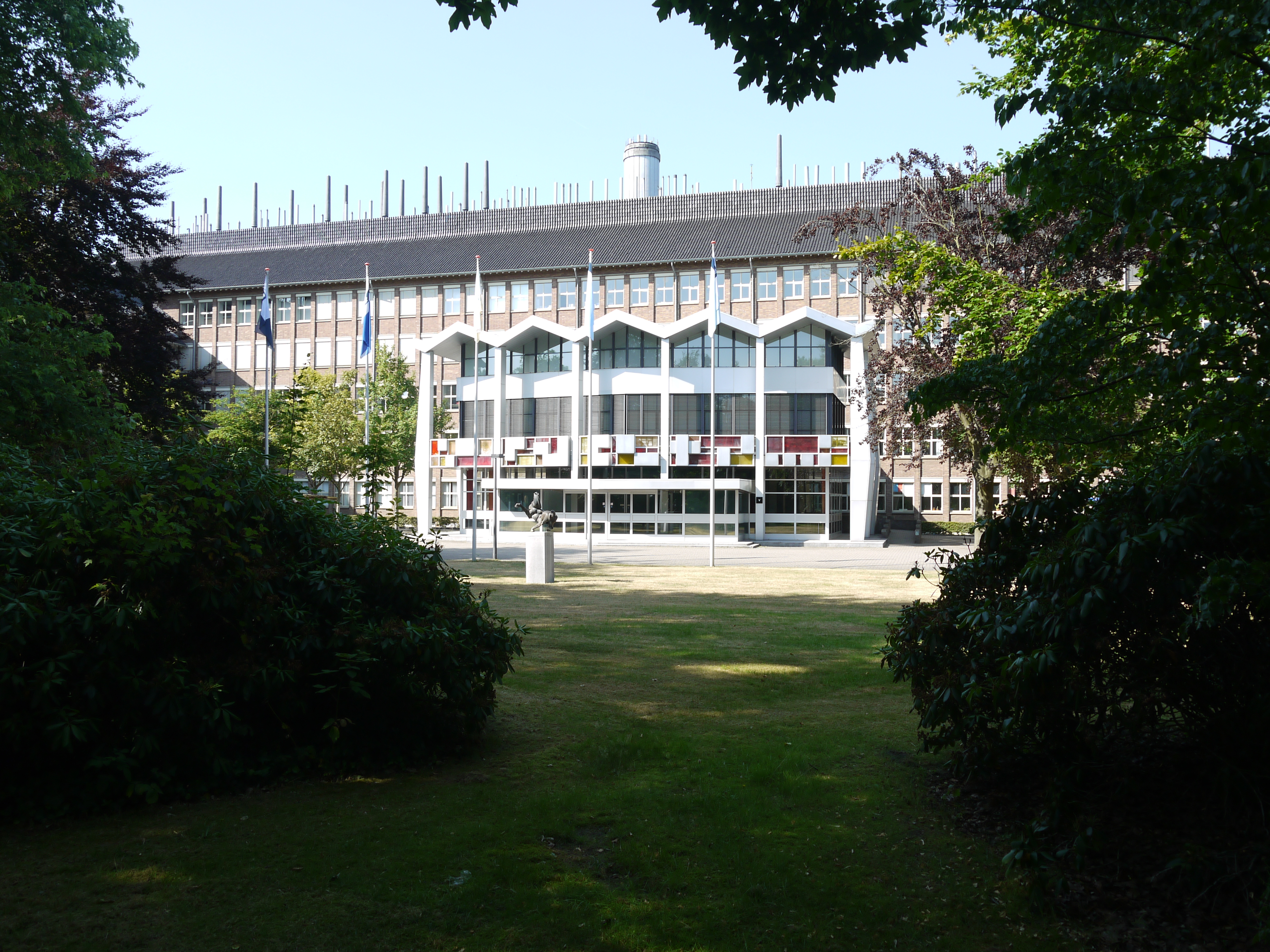
RIVM building

The RIVM organisation consists of three domains with specific knowledge and expertise: Infectious Diseases and Vaccinology (Centre for Infectious Disease Control), Environment and Safety (including environmental incident service), Public Health and Health Services (including food and food safety).

== See also ==
- KNMI (institute)
- Netherlands Environmental Assessment Agency
- National public health institutes
